= Seven Days Battles order of battle: Union =

The following Union Army units and commanders fought in the Seven Days Battles (from June 25 to July 1, 1862) of the American Civil War. Order of battle compiled from the army organization-return of casualties during the battle and the reports. The Confederate order of battle is listed separately.

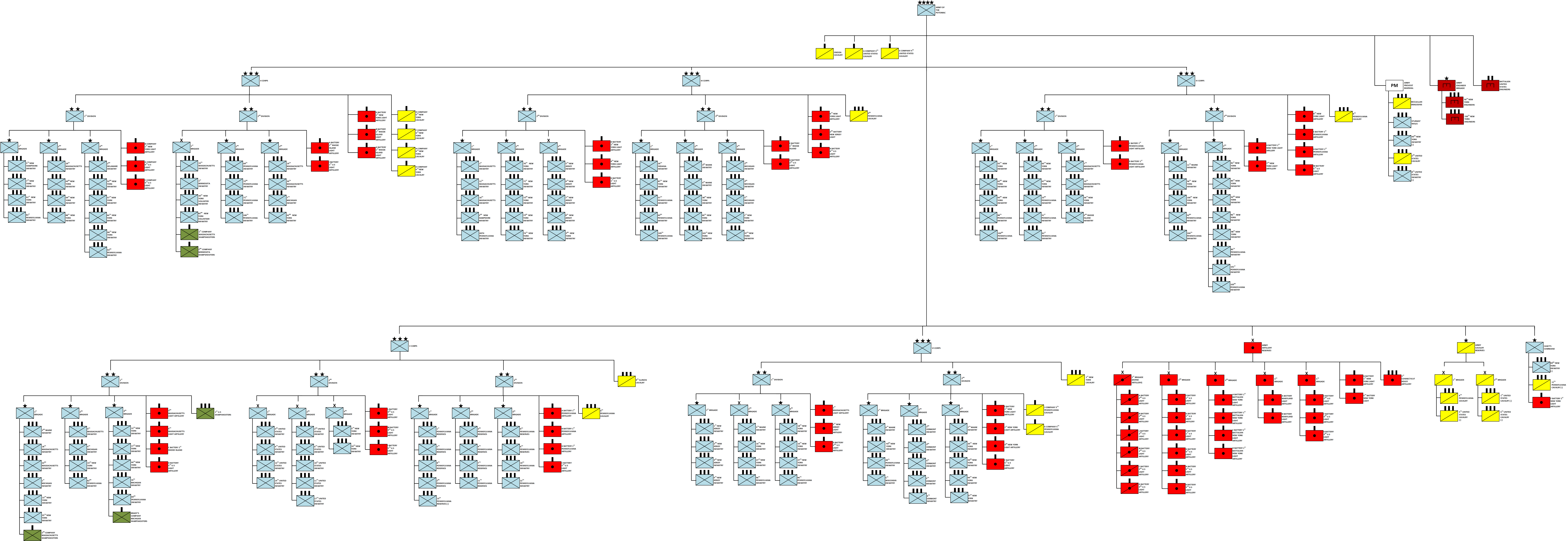
Organization of the Union Army of the Potomac during the Seven Days Battle of the American Civil War

== Abbreviations used ==
=== Military rank ===
- MG = Major General
- BG = Brigadier General
- Col = Colonel
- Ltc = Lieutenant Colonel
- Maj = Major
- Cpt = Captain
- Lt = Lieutenant
- Sgt = Sergeant

=== Other ===
- w = wounded
- mw = mortally wounded
- k = killed
- c = captured

== Army of the Potomac ==
MG George B. McClellan, Commanding

=== General Staff and Headquarters ===
General Staff

- Chief of Staff: BG Randolph B. Marcy
- Chief of Artillery: BG William F. Barry
- Assistant Adjutant General: BG Seth Williams
- Chief Quartermaster: BG Stewart L. Van Vliet

General Headquarters

- Escort
  - Oneida (New York) Cavalry: Cpt James B. McIntyre
  - 4th United States Cavalry (Companies A & E): Cpt James B. McIntyre
- Provost Marshal General: BG Andrew Porter
  - McClellan Dragoons: Maj Alfred Pleasonton
  - Sturges' Rifles: Maj Granville O. Haller
  - 93rd New York (Companies A, F, H, & K): Maj Granville O. Haller
  - 2nd United States Cavalry: Maj Alfred Pleasonton
  - 8th United States (Companies F & G): Cpt Royal T. Frank; Lt Eugene Carter
- United States Engineers
  - Battalion United States Engineers: Cpt James C. Duane
- Engineer Brigade: BG Daniel P. Woodbury
  - 15th New York Engineers: Col John McLeod Murphy
  - 50th New York Engineers: Col Charles B. Stuart

=== II Corps ===
BG Edwin V. Sumner

Division	Brigade	Regiments and Others
First Division BG Israel B. Richardson	1st Brigade BG John C. Caldwell	5th New Hampshire: Ltc Samuel G. Langley; Cpt Edward E. Sturtevant; 7th New York: Col George W. von Schack; 61st New York: Col Francis Channing Barlow; 81st Pennsylvania: Col Charles F. Johnson (w - Glendale); Ltc Eli T. Conner (k - Malvern Hill); Maj H. Boyd McKeen
First Division BG Israel B. Richardson	2nd Brigade BG Thomas F. Meagher; Col Robert Nugent; BG Thomas F. Meagher	29th Massachusetts: Col Ebenezer W. Pierce (w - White Oak Swamp); Ltc Joseph H. Barnes; 63rd New York: Col John Burke (w); Ltc Henry Fowler; Cpt Joseph O'Neill; 69th New York: Col Robert Nugent; 88th New York: Col Henry M. Baker; Maj James Quinlan
First Division BG Israel B. Richardson	3rd Brigade BG William H. French	2nd Delaware: Ltc William P. Bailey; Cpt David L. Stricker; 52nd New York: Col Paul Frank; 57th New York: Col Samuel K. Zook; 64th New York: Col Thomas J. Parker; 66th New York: Col Joseph C. Pinckney; 53rd Pennsylvania: Col John R. Brooke
First Division BG Israel B. Richardson	Artillery Cpt George W. Hazzard (mw - White Oak Swamp)	Battery B, 1st New York Light Artillery: Cpt Rufus D. Pettit; Battery A, 4th U.S. Artillery: Lt Rufus King, Jr.; Battery C, 4th U.S. Artillery: Cpt George W. Hazzard (mw); Lt Edward Field
Second Division BG John Sedgwick (w - Glendale)	1st Brigade Col Alfred Sully	15th Massachusetts: Ltc John W. Kimball; 1st Minnesota: Col Stephen Miller; 34th New York Volunteer Infantry Regiment: Col James A. Suiter; 82nd New York Volunteer Infantry Regiment (Also known as the 2nd Militia); Col Henry W. Hudson; 1st Company, Massachusetts Sharpshooters: Cpt John Saunders; 2nd Company, Minnesota Sharpshooters: Cpt William F. Russell
Second Division BG John Sedgwick (w - Glendale)	2nd Brigade BG William W. Burns	69th Pennsylvania: Col Joshua T. Owen; 71st Pennsylvania: Ltc William G. Jones; 72nd Pennsylvania: Col De Witt C. Baxter; 106th Pennsylvania: Col Turner G. Morehead
Second Division BG John Sedgwick (w - Glendale)	3rd Brigade BG Napoleon J.T. Dana	19th Massachusetts: Col Edward W. Hinks (w - Glendale); Cpt Edmund Rice; Ltc Arthur F. Devereux; 20th Massachusetts: Col William Raymond Lee; 7th Michigan: Col Ira R. Grosvenor; 42nd New York: Col Edmund C. Charles (w&c); Ltc James J. Mooney
Second Division BG John Sedgwick (w - Glendale)	Artillery Col Charles H. Tompkins	1st Rhode Island Light, Battery A: Cpt John A. Tompkins; Battery I, 1st U.S. Artillery: Lt Edmund Kirby
	Artillery Reserve	Battery G, 1st New York Light Artillery: Cpt John D. Frank; 1st Rhode Island Light, Battery B: Cpt Walter O. Bartlett; 1st Rhode Island Light, Battery G: Cpt Charles D. Owen
	Cavalry	6th New York Cavalry (Companies D, F, H and K): : Ltc Duncan McVicar

=== III Corps ===
BG Samuel P. Heintzelman (w - Glendale)

Division	Brigade	Regiments and Others
Second Division BG Joseph Hooker	1st Brigade BG Cuvier Grover	1st Massachusetts: Col Robert Cowdin; 11th Massachusetts: Col William E. Blaisdell; 16th Massachusetts: Col Powell T. Wyman (k - Glendale); Ltc George A. Meacham (w); Maj Daniel S. Lamson; 2nd New Hampshire: Col Gilman Marston; 26th Pennsylvania: Ltc George D. Wells
Second Division BG Joseph Hooker	2nd Brigade BG Daniel Sickles	70th New York Infantry Regiment: Maj Thomas Holt; 71st New York Infantry Regiment: Col George B. Hall; 72nd New York Infantry Regiment: Col Nelson Taylor; 73rd New York Infantry Regiment: Cpt Alfred A. Donalds; 74th New York Infantry Regiment: Col Charles K. Graham
Second Division BG Joseph Hooker	3rd Brigade Col Joseph B. Carr	5th New Jersey: Maj John Ramsey; 6th New Jersey: Col Gershom Mott; 7th New Jersey: Col Joseph W. Revere; Cpt Henry C. Bartlett; 8th New Jersey: Maj William A. Henry; 2nd New York: Ltc William A. Olmsted
Second Division BG Joseph Hooker	Artillery	Battery D, 1st New York Light Artillery: Cpt Thomas W. Osborn; 4th New York Light Artillery: Lt Joseph E. Nairn; Battery H, 1st U.S. Artillery: Cpt Charles H. Webber
Third Division BG Philip Kearny	1st Brigade BG John C. Robinson	20th Indiana: Col William L. Brown; 87th New York: Ltc Richard A. Bachia; 57th Pennsylvania: Ltc Elhanon W. Woods; 63rd Pennsylvania: Col Alexander Hays; 105th Pennsylvania: Col Amor A. McKnight, Ltc William W. Corbet, Cpt Calvin A. Craig
Third Division BG Philip Kearny	2nd Brigade BG David B. Birney	3rd Maine: Ltc C. A. L. Sampson, Maj Edwin Burt; 4th Maine: Col Elijah Walker; 38th New York: Col J. H. Hobart Ward; 40th New York: Ltc Thomas W. Egan; 101st New York: Col Enrico Fardella
Third Division BG Philip Kearny	3rd Brigade BG Hiram G. Berry	2nd Michigan: Maj Louis Dillman, Cpt William Humphrey; 3rd Michigan: Ltc Ambrose A. Stevens, Maj Byron R. Pierce; 5th Michigan: Maj John D. Fairbanks (mw - Glendale), Cpt Judson S. Farrer; 1st New York: Col Garrett Dyckman; 37th New York: Col Samuel B. Hayman
Third Division BG Philip Kearny	Artillery	1st Rhode Island Light, Battery E: Cpt George E. Randolph; Battery G, 2nd U.S. Artillery: Cpt James Thompson
	Artillery Reserve Cpt Gustavus A. De Russy	6th New York Light Artillery: Cpt Walter M. Bramhall; New Jersey Light, 2nd Battery: Cpt John E. Beam (k - Malvern Hill), Lt John B. Monroe; Battery K, 4th U.S. Artillery: Lt Francis W. Seeley
	Cavalry Col William W. Averell	3rd Pennsylvania Cavalry: Col William W. Averell

=== IV Corps ===
BG Erasmus D. Keyes

Division	Brigade	Regiments and Others
First Division BG Darius N. Couch	1st Brigade BG Albion P. Howe	55th New York: Ltc Louis Thourot; 62nd New York: Col David J. Nevin; 93rd Pennsylvania: Cpt John S. Long; 98th Pennsylvania: Col John F. Ballier; 102nd Pennsylvania: Col Thomas Algeo Rowley
First Division BG Darius N. Couch	2nd Brigade BG John J. Abercrombie	65th New York: Ltc Alexander Shaler; 67th New York: Ltc Nelson Cross; 23rd Pennsylvania: Col Thomas H. Neill (w - Malvern Hill); 31st Pennsylvania: Col David H. Williams; 61st Pennsylvania: Ltc Frank Vallee
First Division BG Darius N. Couch	3rd Brigade BG Innis N. Palmer	7th Massachusetts: Col David A. Russell; 10th Massachusetts: Maj Ozro Miller (mw - Malvern Hill); Cpt Frederick Barton; 36th New York: Maj James A. Raney; 2nd Rhode Island: Col Frank Wheaton
First Division BG Darius N. Couch	Artillery	Battery C, 1st Pennsylvania Light Artillery: Cpt Jeremiah McCarthy; Battery D, 1st Pennsylvania Light Artillery: Cpt Edward H. Flood
Second Division BG John J. Peck	1st Brigade BG Henry M. Naglee	11th Maine: Col Harris M. Plaisted; 56th New York: Col Charles H. Van Wyck; 100th New York: Ltc Phineas Staunton; 52nd Pennsylvania: Ltc Henry M. Hoyt; 104th Pennsylvania: Ltc John W. Nields
Second Division BG John J. Peck	2nd Brigade BG Henry W. Wessells	81st New York: Col Edwin Rose; 85th New York: Col Jonathan S. Belknap; 92nd New York: Ltc Hiram Anderson, Jr.; 96th New York: Col James Fairman; 98th New York: Ltc Charles Durkee; 85th Pennsylvania: Col Joshua B. Howell; 101st Pennsylvania: Cpt Charles W. May; 103rd Pennsylvania: Col Theodore F. Lehmann
Second Division BG John J. Peck	Artillery	Battery H, 1st New York Light Artillery: Lt Charles E. Mink; 7th New York Artillery: Cpt Peter C. Regan
	Artillery Reserve Maj Robert M. West	8th New York Light Artillery: Cpt Butler Fitch; Battery E, 1st Pennsylvania Artillery: Cpt Theodore Miller; Battery H, 1st Pennsylvania Artillery: Cpt James Brady; Battery M, 5th U.S. Artillery: Cpt James McKnight
	Cavalry Col David M. Gregg	8th Pennsylvania Cavalry: Col David M. Gregg

=== V Corps ===
BG Fitz J. Porter

Division	Brigade	Regiments and Others
First Division BG George W. Morell	1st Brigade BG John H. Martindale	2nd Maine: Col Charles W. Roberts; 18th Massachusetts: Col James Barnes; 22nd Massachusetts: Col Jesse A. Gove (k - Gaines' Mill), Maj William S. Tilton (w&c - Gaines' Mill), Cpt Walter S. Sampson, Cpt D. K. Wardwell; 1st Michigan: Col Horace S. Roberts; 13th New York: Col Elisha G. Marshall, Maj Francis A. Schoeffel; 25th New York: Maj Edwin S. Gilbert (c), Cpt Shepard Gleason; 2nd Company, Massachusetts Sharpshooters: Lt Charles D. Stiles
First Division BG George W. Morell	2nd Brigade BG Charles Griffin	9th Massachusetts: Col Thomas Cass (mw - Malvern Hill); Ltc Patrick R. Guiney; 4th Michigan: Col Dwight A. Woodbury (k - Malvern Hill), Ltc Jonathan W. Childs (w), Cpt John M. Randolph; 14th New York: Col James McQuade; 62nd Pennsylvania: Col Samuel W. Black (k - Gaines' Mill); Ltc Jacob B. Sweitzer (w&c - Gaines' Mill), Cpt James Hull
First Division BG George W. Morell	3rd Brigade BG Daniel Butterfield	12th New York: Ltc Robert M. Richardson; 17th New York: Col Henry S. Lansing; 44th New York: Ltc James C. Rice; 16th Michigan: Col T.B.W. Stockton (c - Gaines' Mill), Ltc John V. Ruele; 83rd Pennsylvania: Col John W. McLane (k), Cpt Hugh S. Campbell (w); Brady's Company Michigan Sharpshooters: Cpt Kin S. Dygert
First Division BG George W. Morell	Artillery Cpt William B. Weeden	3rd Massachusetts Light Artillery: Cpt Augustus Pearl Martin; 5th Massachusetts Light Artillery: Lt John B. Hyde; 1st Rhode Island Light, Battery C: Lt Richard Waterman; Battery D, 5th U.S. Artillery: Lt Henry W. Kingsbury
First Division BG George W. Morell	Sharpshooters Col Hiram Berdan	1st U.S. Sharpshooter Regiment: Col Hiram Berdan
Second Division BG George Sykes	1st Brigade Ltc Robert C. Buchanan	3rd United States: Maj Nathan B. Rossell (k - Gaines' Mill), Cpt Thomas W. Walker, Cpt John D. Wilkins; 4th United States: Maj Delozier Davidson (c), Cpt Joseph B. Collins; 12th United States: Maj Henry B. Clitz (w&c - Gaines' Mill); Cpt John G. Read, Cpt Matthew M. Blunt; 14th United States: Cpt John D. O'Connell
Second Division BG George Sykes	2nd Brigade Ltc William Chapman; Maj Charles S. Lovell	2nd United States: Cpt Adolphus F. Bond, Lt John S. Poland; 6th United States: Cpt Thomas Hendrickson; 10th United States: Maj Charles S. Lovell; Maj George L. Andrews; 11th United States: Maj DeLancey Floyd-Jones; 17th United States: Maj George L. Andrews
Second Division BG George Sykes	3rd Brigade Col Gouverneur K. Warren (w - Gaines' Mill)	5th New York: Ltc Hiram Duryee; 10th New York: Col John E. Bendix
Second Division BG George Sykes	Artillery Cpt Stephen H. Weed	Battery L and M, 3rd U.S. Artillery: Cpt John Edwards; Battery I, 5th U.S. Artillery: Cpt Stephen H. Weed
Third Division (Pennsylvania Reserves) BG George A. McCall (c - Frayser's Farm); BG Truman Seymour	1st Brigade BG John F. Reynolds (c - Gaines' Mill); Col Seneca G. Simmons (k - Glendale); Col Richard Biddle Roberts	1st Pennsylvania Reserves: Col Richard Biddle Roberts, Maj Lemuel Todd; 2nd Pennsylvania Reserves: Ltc William McCandless; 5th Pennsylvania Reserves: Col Seneca G. Simmons; Ltc Joseph W. Fisher; 8th Pennsylvania Reserves: Col George S. Hays; 13th Pennsylvania Reserves (Companies A, B, D, E, F, & K): Maj Roy Stone
Third Division (Pennsylvania Reserves) BG George A. McCall (c - Frayser's Farm); BG Truman Seymour	2nd Brigade BG George G. Meade (w - Glendale); Col Albert L. Magilton	3rd Pennsylvania Reserves: Col Horatio G. Sickel; 4th Pennsylvania Reserves: Col Albert L. Magilton; 7th Pennsylvania Reserves: Col Elisha B. Harvey; 11th Pennsylvania Reserves: Col Thomas F. Gallagher (c - Gaines' Mill), Cpt Daniel S. Porter
Third Division (Pennsylvania Reserves) BG George A. McCall (c - Frayser's Farm); BG Truman Seymour	3rd Brigade BG Truman Seymour; Col Conrad Feger Jackson	6th Pennsylvania Reserves: --; 9th Pennsylvania Reserves: Col Conrad Feger Jackson, Cpt John Cuthbertson (w); 10th Pennsylvania Reserves: Col James T. Kirk; 12th Pennsylvania Reserves: Col John H. Taggart
Third Division (Pennsylvania Reserves) BG George A. McCall (c - Frayser's Farm); BG Truman Seymour	Artillery Cpt Henry V. De Hart (mw - Gaines' Mill)	Battery A, 1st Pennsylvania Artillery: Cpt Hezekiah Easton (k - Gaines' Mill), Lt Jacob L. Detrich, Lt John G. Simpson; Battery B, 1st Pennsylvania Artillery: Cpt James H. Cooper; Battery G, 1st Pennsylvania Artillery: Cpt Mark Kerns (w), Lt Frank P. Amsden; Battery C, 5th U.S. Artillery: Cpt Henry V. De Hart (mw), Lt Eben G. Scott
Third Division (Pennsylvania Reserves) BG George A. McCall (c - Frayser's Farm); BG Truman Seymour	Cavalry Col James H. Childs	4th Pennsylvania Cavalry: Col James H. Childs
	Cavalry Col John F. Farnsworth	8th Illinois Cavalry: Col John F. Farnsworth

=== VI Corps ===
BG William B. Franklin

Division	Brigade	Regiments and Others
First Division BG Henry W. Slocum	1st Brigade BG George W. Taylor	1st New Jersey: Ltc Robert McAllister, Col A.T.A. Torbert; 2nd New Jersey: Col Isaac M. Tucker (k - Gaines' Mill), Maj Henry O. Ryerson (w - Gaines' Mill), Ltc Samuel L. Buck; 3rd New Jersey: Col Henry W. Brown; 4th New Jersey: Col James H. Simpson (c - Gaines' Mill), Ltc William B. Hatch
First Division BG Henry W. Slocum	2nd Brigade Col Joseph J. Bartlett	5th Maine: Col Nathaniel J. Jackson (w - Gaines' Mill), Ltc William S. Heath (k - Gaines' Mill), Cpt Clark S. Edwards; 16th New York: Col Joseph Howland (w - Gaines' Mill), Maj Joel J. Seaver; 27th New York: Ltc Alexander D. Adams; 96th Pennsylvania: Col Henry L. Cake
First Division BG Henry W. Slocum	3rd Brigade BG John Newton	18th New York: Ltc George R. Myers, Maj John C. Meginnis; 31st New York: Col Calvin E. Pratt (w - Gaines' Mill), Maj Alexander Raszewski; 32nd New York: Col Roderick Matheson; 95th Pennsylvania: Col John M. Gosline (mw - Gaines' Mill), Ltc Gustavus W. Town
First Division BG Henry W. Slocum	Artillery Cpt Edward R. Platt	1st Massachusetts Light Artillery: Cpt Josiah Porter; Battery A, 1st New Jersey Light Artillery: Cpt William Hexamer; Battery D, 2nd U.S. Artillery: Lt Emory Upton
Second Division BG William F. Smith	1st Brigade BG Winfield S. Hancock	6th Maine: Col Hiram Burnham; 43rd New York: Col Francis L. Vinton; 49th Pennsylvania: Col William H. Irwin; 5th Wisconsin: Col Amasa Cobb
Second Division BG William F. Smith	2nd Brigade BG William T. H. Brooks (w - Savage's Station)	2nd Vermont: Col Henry Whiting; 3rd Vermont: Ltc Wheelock G. Veazey; 4th Vermont: Col Edwin H. Stoughton; 5th Vermont: Ltc Lewis A. Grant; 6th Vermont: Col Nathan Lord, Jr.
Second Division BG William F. Smith	3rd Brigade BG John W. Davidson	7th Maine: Col Edwin C. Mason; 20th New York: Col Francis Weiss; 33rd New York: Col Robert F. Taylor; 49th New York: Col Daniel D. Bidwell; 77th New York: Col James B. McKean
Second Division BG William F. Smith	Artillery Cpt Romeyn B. Ayres	Battery E, 1st New York Light Artillery: Cpt Charles C. Wheeler; 1st New York Light Artillery: Cpt Andrew Cowan; 3rd New York Light Artillery: Cpt Thaddeus P. Mott; Battery F, 5th U.S. Artillery: Cpt Romeyn B. Ayres
Second Division BG William F. Smith	Cavalry	5th Pennsylvania Cavalry (Companies I & K): Cpt John O'Farrell
	Cavalry	1st New York Cavalry: Col Andrew T. McReynolds

=== Artillery Reserve ===
Col Henry J. Hunt

Brigade	Batteries
First Brigade (Horse Artillery) Ltc William Hays	Battery A, 2nd U.S. Artillery: Cpt John C. Tidball; Battery B and L, 2nd U.S. Artillery: Cpt James M. Robertson; Battery M, 2nd U.S. Artillery: Cpt Henry Benson; Battery C and G, 3rd U.S. Artillery: Cpt Horatio G. Gibson
Second Brigade Ltc George W. Getty	Battery E and G, 1st U.S. Artillery: Lt Alanson M. Randol; Battery K, 1st U.S. Artillery: Lt Samuel S. Elder; Battery G, 4th U.S. Artillery: Lt Charles M. Morgan; Battery A, 5th U.S. Artillery: Lt Adelbert Ames; Battery K, 5th U.S. Artillery: Cpt John R. Smead
Third Brigade Maj Albert Arndt	Battery A, 1st Battalion, New York Volunteer Light Artillery: Cpt Otto Diederichs; Battery B, 1st Battalion, New York Volunteer Light Artillery: Cpt Adolph Voegelee; Battery C, 1st Battalion, New York Volunteer Light Artillery: Cpt John Knieriem; Battery D, 1st Battalion, New York Volunteer Light Artillery: Cpt Edward Grimm
Fourth Brigade Maj Edward R. Petherbridge	Battery A, Maryland Light Artillery: Cpt John W. Wolcott; Battery B, Maryland Light Artillery: Cpt Alonzo Snow
Fifth Brigade Cpt J. Howard Carlisle	Battery E, 2nd U.S. Artillery: Cpt J. Howard Carlisle; Battery F and K, 3rd U.S. Artillery: Cpt La Rhett L. Livingston
Unattached Sixth Brigade	Battery G, 1st New York Light Artillery: Cpt John D. Frank; New York Light, 5th Battery: Cpt Elijah D. Taft
Siege Train Col Robert O. Tyler	1st Connecticut Heavy Artillery: Col Robert O. Tyler

=== Cavalry Reserve ===
Division	Brigade	Regiments and Others
Cavalry Reserve BG Philip St. George Cooke
Cavalry Reserve BG Philip St. George Cooke	First Brigade Col Richard H. Rush	6th Pennsylvania Cavalry: Col Richard H. Rush; 5th United States Cavalry (Companies A, D, H, & L): Cpt Charles J. Whiting (w&c), Cpt Joseph H. McArthur
Cavalry Reserve BG Philip St. George Cooke	Second Brigade Col George A. H. Blake (w - Gaines' Mill)	1st United States Cavalry (Companies A, C, F, & H): Ltc William N. Grier; 6th United States Cavalry: Cpt August Kautz

=== Casey's Command ===
Brigade	Regiments and Others
Casey's Command (at White House Landing) BG Silas Casey (w)	11th Pennsylvania Cavalry (Companies B, D, F, I, & K): Col Josiah Harlan; Battery F, 1st New York Light Artillery: Cpt William R. Wilson; 93rd New York (Companies B, C, D, E, G, & L): Col Thomas F. Morris
