= 9th Pennsylvania Reserve Regiment =

Union Army infantry regiment

9th Pennsylvania Reserve Regiment (38th Pennsylvania Volunteer Infantry)
- Active: June 28, 1861 to May 12, 1864
- Country: United States
- Allegiance: Union
- Branch: Infantry
- Engagements: Battle of Dranesville; Seven Days Battles; Battle of Mechanicsville; Battle of Gaines's Mill; Battle of Savage's Station; Battle of Glendale; Battle of Malvern Hill; Second Battle of Bull Run; Battle of South Mountain; Battle of Antietam; Battle of Fredericksburg; Battle of Gettysburg; Bristoe Campaign; Mine Run Campaign

The 9th Pennsylvania Reserve Regiment also known as the 38th Pennsylvania Volunteer Infantry was an infantry regiment that served in the Union Army as part of the Pennsylvania Reserves infantry division during the American Civil War.

== Organization ==
Company	Moniker	Primary Location of Recruitment	Captains
A	The Pittsburg Rifles	Allegheny County	Lewis W. Smith
B	The Garibaldi Guards	Allegheny County	Frank Hartmayer
C	The Iron City Guards	Allegheny County	James T. Shannon
D	The Government Guards	Allegheny County	Robert Galway
E	The Chartier Valley Guards	Allegheny County	Charles Barnes
F	The Meadville Volunteers	Crawford County	Samuel Bernard Dick
G	The City Guards	Allegheny County	John B. Brookbank
H	The New Brighton Rifles	Beaver County	John Cuthbertson
I	The McKeesport Union Guards	Allegheny County	William Lynch
K	The Alleghany Rangers	Allegheny County	Hugh S. Fleming

== Service ==
The 9th Pennsylvania Reserves was organized at Camp Wright near Pittsburgh, Pennsylvania on June 28, 1861 and mustered in July 27, 1861 under the command of Colonel Conrad Feger Jackson. The regiment was initially armed with Model 1842 smoothbore muskets. Although several of their fellow Pennsylvania Reserves regiments carried them for most or all of their service, the 9th Reserves quickly swapped theirs for Model 1861 Springfield rifles.

The regiment was attached to 3rd Brigade, McCall's Pennsylvania Reserves Division, Army of the Potomac, to March 1862. 3rd Brigade, 2nd Division, I Corps, Army of the Potomac, to April 1862. 3rd Brigade, McCall's Division, Department of the Rappahannock, to June 1862. 3rd Brigade, 3rd Division, V Corps, Army of the Potomac, to August 1862. 3rd Brigade, 3rd Division, III Corps, Army of Virginia, to September 1862. 3rd Brigade, 3rd Division, I Corps, Army of the Potomac, to February 1863. 3rd Brigade, Pennsylvania Reserves Division, XXII Corps, Department of Washington, to June 1863. 3rd Brigade, 3rd Division, V Corps, Army of the Potomac, to May 1864.

The 9th Pennsylvania Reserves mustered out May 12, 1864 at Pittsburgh.

== Detailed service ==
Ordered to Washington, D.C., July 22. Camp at Capital Hill, Washington, until August 5, and at Tennallytown, Md., until October 10. Picket at Great Falls September 9–16. Moved to Camp Pierpont, near Langley, Va., October 10, 1861, and duty there until March 10, 1862. Companies A, B, D, F, and G on reconnaissance to Hunter's Mills November 19. Expedition to Gunnell's Farm December 6, and action at Dranesville December 20, 1861. Advance on Manassas, Va., March 10–15, 1862. McDowell's advance on Falmouth April 9–19. Duty at Fredericksburg until June. Moved to White House, Va., June 9–12. Seven Days before Richmond June 25 – July 1. Battles of Mechanicsville June 26. Gaines's Mill June 27. Charles City Cross Roads or Glendale June 30. Malvern Hill July 1. At Harrison's Landing until August 16. Movement to join Pope August 16–26. Battle of Groveton August 29. Second Battle of Bull Run August 30. Maryland Campaign September 6–24. Battle of South Mountain, Md., September 14. Battle of Antietam September 16–17. Duty in Maryland until October 30. Movement to Falmouth, Va., October 30 – November 19. Battle of Fredericksburg December 12–15. "Mud March" January 20–24, 1863. Ordered to Washington, D.C., February 6. Duty there and at Alexandria until June 25. Ordered to rejoin the Army of the Potomac in the field. Battle of Gettysburg, July 1–3. Pursuit of Lee July 5–24. Bristoe Campaign October 9–22. Advance to line of the Rappahannock November 7–8. Rappahannock Station November 7. Mine Run Campaign November 26 – December 2. Rapidan Campaign. Ordered home May 4, 1864 while in line of battle at Spotsylvania. Moved to Harrisburg and then Pittsburgh, arriving there on May 8, 1864.

== Casualties ==
The regiment lost a total of 187 men during service; 6 officers and 131 enlisted men killed or mortally wounded, 1 officer and 49 enlisted men died of disease.

== Commanders ==
- Colonel Conrad Feger Jackson – promoted to brigadier general July 17, 1862
- Lieutenant Colonel Robert Anderson – discharged February 10, 1863
- Lieutenant Colonel James M. Snodgrass
- Major Charles Barnes – commanded during the Mine Run Campaign
- Captain Samuel Bernard Dick – commanded at the Battle of Antietam

== Notable members ==
- Captain Samuel Bernard Dick, Company F – U.S. Representative from Pennsylvania, 1879–1881

== See also ==
- List of Pennsylvania Civil War Units
- Pennsylvania in the Civil War
