= Richard Biddle Roberts =

Union Army officer in the American Civil War

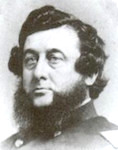
- Born: August 25, 1825; Pittsburgh, Pennsylvania, U.S.
- Died: April 19, 1886 (aged 60) Chicago, Illinois, U.S.
- Buried: Allegheny Cemetery, Pittsburgh, Pennsylvania
- Allegiance: United States (Union)
- Branch: U.S. Army (Union Army)
- Service years: 1861–1862
- Rank: Colonel
- Commands: 1st Pennsylvania Reserve Regiment
- Conflicts: Peninsula Campaign; Battle of South Mountain; Battle of Antietam
- Other work: Lawyer; U.S. District Attorney for the Western District of Pennsylvania

Richard Biddle Roberts (August 25, 1825 – April 19, 1886) was an American lawyer and Union Army officer during the American Civil War. He commanded the 1st Pennsylvania Reserve Regiment through the Peninsula Campaign and the Maryland Campaign, including the actions at South Mountain and Antietam. After resigning his commission in late 1862, he returned to his legal career in Pittsburgh and later practiced in Chicago.

== Early life and legal career ==
Roberts was born on August 25, 1825, in Pittsburgh, Pennsylvania, the son of Edward I. Roberts and Elisa (Campbell) Roberts. He pursued a career in law, showing early promise in the profession. He served as district attorney of Allegheny County from 1853 to 1856 and was appointed United States Attorney for the Western District of Pennsylvania from 1857 to 1861. In 1854, he married Mary H. Anderson, a member of a prominent Pennsylvania family.

== Civil War service ==
At the outbreak of the Civil War, Roberts volunteered for service in the Union Army. He was instrumental in raising the 12th Pennsylvania Infantry and was commissioned as its captain before being promoted to lieutenant colonel on the staff of Governor Andrew G. Curtin. With the organization of the Pennsylvania Reserves, Roberts was commissioned colonel of the 1st Pennsylvania Reserve Regiment.

He saw significant action during the Seven Days Battles, particularly at Beaver Dam Creek and Gaines' Mill, where he fought under the command of General Fitz John Porter. At the Battle of Glendale on June 30, 1862, Roberts' regiment played a key role in resisting a Confederate attempt to cut the Union Army in two, withstanding heavy assaults in exposed positions along the New Market Road. General George A. McCall, commanding the Pennsylvania Reserves, praised Roberts’s conduct in his official report.

Roberts also distinguished himself at the Battle of South Mountain on September 14, 1862, where he led a determined assault against Confederate positions at Turner's Gap. His regiment advanced under heavy fire, successfully dislodging the enemy from a fortified stone wall and helping secure the pass.

Following this campaign, Roberts was again called into service by Governor Curtin, who appointed him to manage military promotions and commissions. By the end of 1864, Roberts's office had issued over 4,000 commissions, requiring careful evaluation of numerous competing claims.

== Postbellum career ==
After the war, Roberts resumed his legal practice in Pittsburgh before relocating to Chicago in 1869. There, he developed a successful legal career, particularly in corporate and patent law. Though he identified with the Republican Party after the war, he remained politically inactive in later years. Before the conflict, he had been affiliated with the Democratic Party. He served as president of the Chicago Bar Association and also led the St. Andrew's Benevolent Society of Illinois.

Roberts died on April 19, 1886 in Chicago. His remains are buried in Allegheny Cemetery.
