= Battery A, 1st Pennsylvania Light Artillery =

Light artillery battery of the Union Army

- Active: August 5, 1861 - July 25, 1865
- Country: United States
- Allegiance: Union
- Branch: Artillery
- Engagements: Battle of Dranesville; Seven Days Battles; Battle of Gaines's Mill; Second Battle of Bull Run; Battle of South Mountain; Battle of Antietam; Battle of Fredericksburg; Siege of Suffolk; Siege of Petersburg; Battle of Chaffin's Farm; Battle of Fair Oaks & Darbytown Road

Battery A, 1st Pennsylvania Light Artillery was a light artillery battery that served in the Union Army as part of the Pennsylvania Reserves infantry division during the American Civil War.

== Service ==
The battery was organized at Harrisburg, Pennsylvania and mustered in for a three-year enlistment on August 5, 1861 under the command of Captain Hezekiah Easton.

The battery was attached to McCall's Pennsylvania Reserve Division, Army of the Potomac, to March 1862. Artillery, 2nd Division, I Corps, Army of the Potomac, to April 1862. Artillery, McCall's Division, Department of the Rappahannock, to June 1862. Artillery, 3rd Division, V Corps, Army of the Potomac, to August 1862. Artillery, 3rd Division, III Corps, Army of Virginia, to September 1862. Artillery, 3rd Division, I Corps, Army of the Potomac, to February 1863. Artillery, 3rd Division, IX Corps, Army of the Potomac, to April 1863. Artillery, 2nd Division, VII Corps, Department of Virginia, to July 1863. U.S. Forces, Norfolk and Portsmouth, Virginia, Department of Virginia and North Carolina, to January 1864. Artillery, Heckman's Division, XVIII Corps, Department of Virginia and North Carolina, to April 1864. Defenses of Portsmouth, Virginia, Department of Virginia and North Carolina, to May 1864. District of Eastern Virginia, Department of Virginia and North Carolina, to July 1864. Artillery Brigade, X Corps, to October 1864. Artillery Brigade, XVIII Corps, to December 1864. Artillery Brigade, XXIV Corps, Department of Virginia, to July 1865.

Battery A, 1st Pennsylvania Light Artillery mustered out of service July 25, 1865 at Harrisburg, Pennsylvania.

== Detailed service ==
Ordered to Washington, D.C., August 1861. Camp at Tennallytown, Md., until October 1861, and at Camp Pierpont near Langley, Va., until March 1862. Expedition to Grinnell's Farm December 6, 1861. Action at Dranesville, Va., December 20. Advance on Manassas, Va., March 10–15. McDowell's advance on Falmouth April 9–19. Duty at Falmouth and Fredericksburg until June. Ordered to the Virginia Peninsula. Seven Days before Richmond, Va., June 25-July 1. Beaver Dam Creek or Mechanicsville June 26. Gaines' Mill June 27. Charles City Cross Roads and Glendale June 30. Malvern Hill July 1. At Harrison's Landing until August 15. Movement to join Pope August 15–26. Battle of Gainesville August 28. Battle of Groveton August 29. Second Battle of Bull Run August 30. Maryland Campaign September. Battle of South Mountain September 14. Battle of Antietam, Md., September 16–17. Movement to Falmouth, Va., October–November. Battle of Fredericksburg, Va., December 12–15. "Mud March" January 20–24, 1863. Ordered to Newport News February 9, then to Suffolk, March. Siege of Suffolk April 12-May 4. Dix's Peninsula Campaign June 26-July 8. Expedition from White House to South Anna River July 1–7. Duty at Portsmouth, Va., until July 1864. Siege operations against Petersburg and Richmond July 1864 to April 1865. Chaffin's Farm, New Market Heights, September 28–30, 1864. Fair Oaks October 27–28. Before Richmond until April 1865. Occupation of Richmond April 3. Engaged in demolishing defenses and removing ordnance at Richmond until July.

== Casualties ==
The battery lost a total of 38 men during service; 1 officer and 16 enlisted men killed or mortally wounded, 21 enlisted men died of disease.

== Commanders ==
- Captain Hezekiah Easton - killed in action at the Battle of Gaines's Mill
- Captain John G. Simpson - dismissed from the service August 21, 1864
- Captain William Stitt
- 1st Lieutenant John G. Simpson - commanded the battery after Cpt Easton was killed in action at the Battle of Gaines's Mill

== See also ==
- List of Pennsylvania Civil War Units
- Pennsylvania in the Civil War
