= Battery C, 1st Pennsylvania Light Artillery =

Light artillery battery of the Union Army

- Active: August 5, 1861 - October 23, 1863
- Country: United States
- Allegiance: Union
- Branch: Artillery
- Engagements: Siege of Yorktown; Battle of Williamsburg; Battle of Seven Pines; Seven Days Battles; Battle of Savage's Station; Battle of Glendale; Battle of Malvern Hill; Battle of Antietam; Battle of Fredericksburg

Battery C, 1st Pennsylvania Light Artillery was a light artillery battery that served in the Union Army as part of the Pennsylvania Reserves infantry division during the American Civil War.

== Service ==
The battery was organized at Philadelphia, Pennsylvania and mustered in for a three-year enlistment on August 5, 1861 under the command of Captain John George Simpson.

The battery was attached to W. F. Smith's Division, Army of the Potomac, October 1861 to March 1862. Artillery, 1st Division, IV Corps, Army of the Potomac, to September 1862. Artillery, 3rd Division, VI Corps, Army of the Potomac, to May 1863. Artillery Brigade, VI Corps, to June 1863. Camp Barry, Defenses of Washington, D.C., XXII Corps, to July 1863. 1st Brigade, Lockwood's Division, Department of the Susquehanna, to August 1863. Maryland Heights Division, Department of West Virginia, to October 1863.

Battery C, 1st Pennsylvania Light Artillery ceased to exist on October 23, 1863 when it was consolidated with Battery D, 1st Pennsylvania Light Artillery.

== Detailed service ==
Duty at Camp Barry and in the defenses of Washington until March 1862. Ordered to the Virginia Peninsula March. Siege of Yorktown April 5-May 4. Battle of Williamsburg May 5. Battle of Fair Oaks or Seven Pines May 31-June 1. Seven Days Battles before Richmond June 25-July 1. James River Road near Fair Oaks June 29. Savage Station June 29. Charles City Cross Roads and Glendale June 30. Malvern Hill July 1. At Harrison's Landing until August 16. Movement to Fort Monroe, then to Alexandria August 16–24. Maryland Campaign September. Battle of Antietam September 16–17. Duty in Maryland until October 29. Movement to Falmouth, Va., October 29-November 19. Battle of Fredericksburg December 12–15. "Mud March" January 20–24, 1863. Chancellorsville Campaign April 27-May 6. Operations at Franklin's Crossing April 29-May 2. Maryes Heights, Fredericksburg, May 3. Salem Heights May 3–4. Banks' Ford May 4. Ordered to Washington, D.C., June, and duty there until July. Moved to Maryland Heights July 9. Duty at Harpers Ferry. W. Va. until October.

== Commanders ==
- Captain John George Simpson - discharged December 9, 1861; assigned command of Battery A, 1st Pennsylvania Light Artillery
- Captain Jeremiah McCarthy - discharged October 8, 1863

== See also ==
- List of Pennsylvania Civil War Units
- Pennsylvania in the Civil War
