= Samuel W. Crawford =

Union Army General

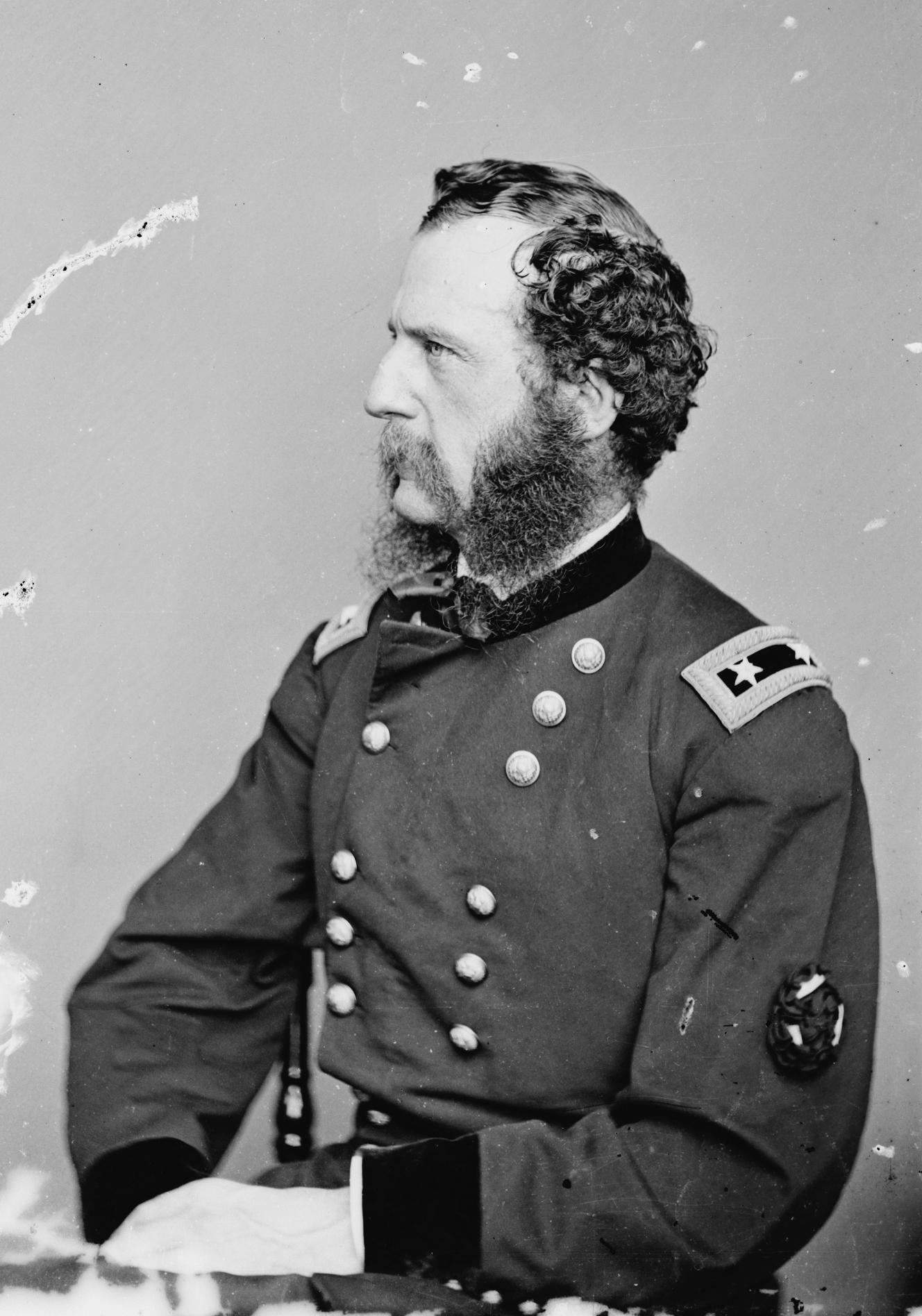
- Samuel W. Crawford
- Born: November 8, 1829; Franklin County, Pennsylvania, U.S.
- Died: November 3, 1892 (aged 62); Philadelphia, Pennsylvania, U.S.
- Burial place: Laurel Hill Cemetery, Philadelphia, Pennsylvania, U.S.
- Education: University of Pennsylvania, University of Pennsylvania School of Medicine
- Military career
- Allegiance: United States of America; Union
- Branch: United States Army; Union Army
- Service years: 1851–1873
- Rank: Brigadier General; Brevet Major General
- Commands: Pennsylvania Reserves
- Conflicts: American Civil War; Battle of Fort Sumter; Northern Virginia Campaign; Battle of Cedar Mountain; Battle of Antietam; Battle of Gettysburg; Petersburg Campaign; Battle of Globe Tavern; Battle of Five Forks
- Other work: author

Samuel Wylie Crawford (November 8, 1829 – November 3, 1892) was a United States Army surgeon and a Union general in the American Civil War.

He served as a surgeon at Fort Sumter, South Carolina, during the Confederate bombardment in 1861. He transferred to the infantry early in the war and led a brigade at Cedar Mountain which routed a division that included Stonewall Jackson’s unit, though it was later driven back. He was severely wounded at Antietam and returned to action at Gettysburg, where his division drove the Confederates out of "the valley of Death" beside Little Round Top, with Crawford dramatically seizing the colors and leading from the front. The preservation of the battlefield after the war is due in large part to his efforts.

During the Battle of Five Forks, his division went astray which caused his corps commander, Maj. Gen. Gouverneur K. Warren, to miss the attack while searching for them – one of the pretexts used by Philip Sheridan for his controversial removal of Warren.

Crawford was present for Robert E. Lee's surrender at Appomattox Court House in April 1865 which made him one of the few soldiers to be present at both the beginning and the end of the Civil War.

== Early life ==
Crawford was born in Franklin County, Pennsylvania. He was the son of the Reverend Samuel Wylie Crawford and Jane Agnew. He graduated from the University of Pennsylvania in 1846 and the University of Pennsylvania School of Medicine in 1850. He joined the U.S. Army as an assistant surgeon in 1851 and served in that capacity for ten years. Crawford was of Scottish heritage.

== Civil War ==
Crawford was the surgeon on duty at Fort Sumter, South Carolina, during the Confederate bombardment in 1861, which represented the start of the Civil War. Despite his purely medical background, he was in command of several of the artillery pieces returning fire from the fort.

A month after Fort Sumter, Crawford decided on a fundamental career change and accepted a commission as a major in the 13th U.S. Infantry. He served as Assistant Inspector General of the Department of the Ohio starting in September 1861. He was promoted to brigadier general of volunteers on April 25, 1862, and led a brigade in the Department of the Shenandoah under Major General Nathaniel Banks. The brigade participated in the Valley Campaign but saw no actual combat. Its first taste of battle was during the Northern Virginia Campaign, when it was assigned to the Army of Virginia under Maj. Gen. John Pope. At the Battle of Cedar Mountain, Crawford's brigade launched a surprise attack upon the Confederate left, routing a division that included the Stonewall Brigade. The Confederates counterattacked, however, and Crawford's brigade, which was unsupported by other units, was driven back with 50% casualties.

At the Battle of Antietam, Crawford temporarily commanded his division when Brig. Gen. Alpheus S. Williams was elevated to command the XII Corps. Crawford's temporary command was short, however, when he was wounded in the right thigh. He stayed on the field until he became weak from loss of blood and had to be carried off. The wound took eight months to heal properly and he was unable to return to the field until May 1863, when he was given command of the Pennsylvania Reserves Division in the defenses of Washington, D.C. In commanding this division, Crawford was following in the footsteps of two Union Army luminaries: John F. Reynolds and George G. Meade.

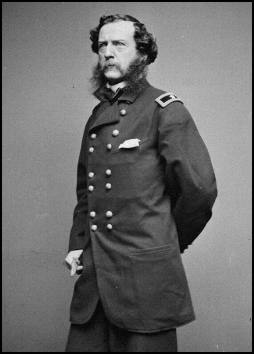
Samuel W. Crawford

In June 1863, the Pennsylvania Reserves Division was added to the Army of the Potomac for the Gettysburg campaign. Crawford was in a difficult situation. His training was as a surgeon, not as an infantry officer, and although he had experience at the brigade level, his eight-month recuperation meant that his skills were at minimal levels at the start of a critical campaign. Furthermore, the troops of his division had just spent six months on easy garrison duty around Washington and were not fully combat ready. On July 2, 1863, Crawford and his division arrived at Gettysburg in the rear of the V Corps, led by Maj. Gen. George Sykes. He was ordered to the front to assist the brigade of Col. Strong Vincent on Little Round Top, but the battle had already petered out by the time his division arrived.

Meanwhile, the Confederate troops of Lt. Gen. James Longstreet's Corps had swept through the Devil's Den, driving the Union defenders back to Plum Run, a stream just to the west of Little Round Top, and an area that became known to the soldiers as "the Valley of Death". Crawford's division swept down the slope of Little Round Top along with the brigades of Colonels William McCandless and David J. Nevin. McCandless's brigade led the charge, but Crawford apparently desired some of the glory and seized his own division's colors from a surprised sergeant to lead them in the charge, too. The charge was successful, meeting little resistance, and the Confederates were driven from the Valley of Death.

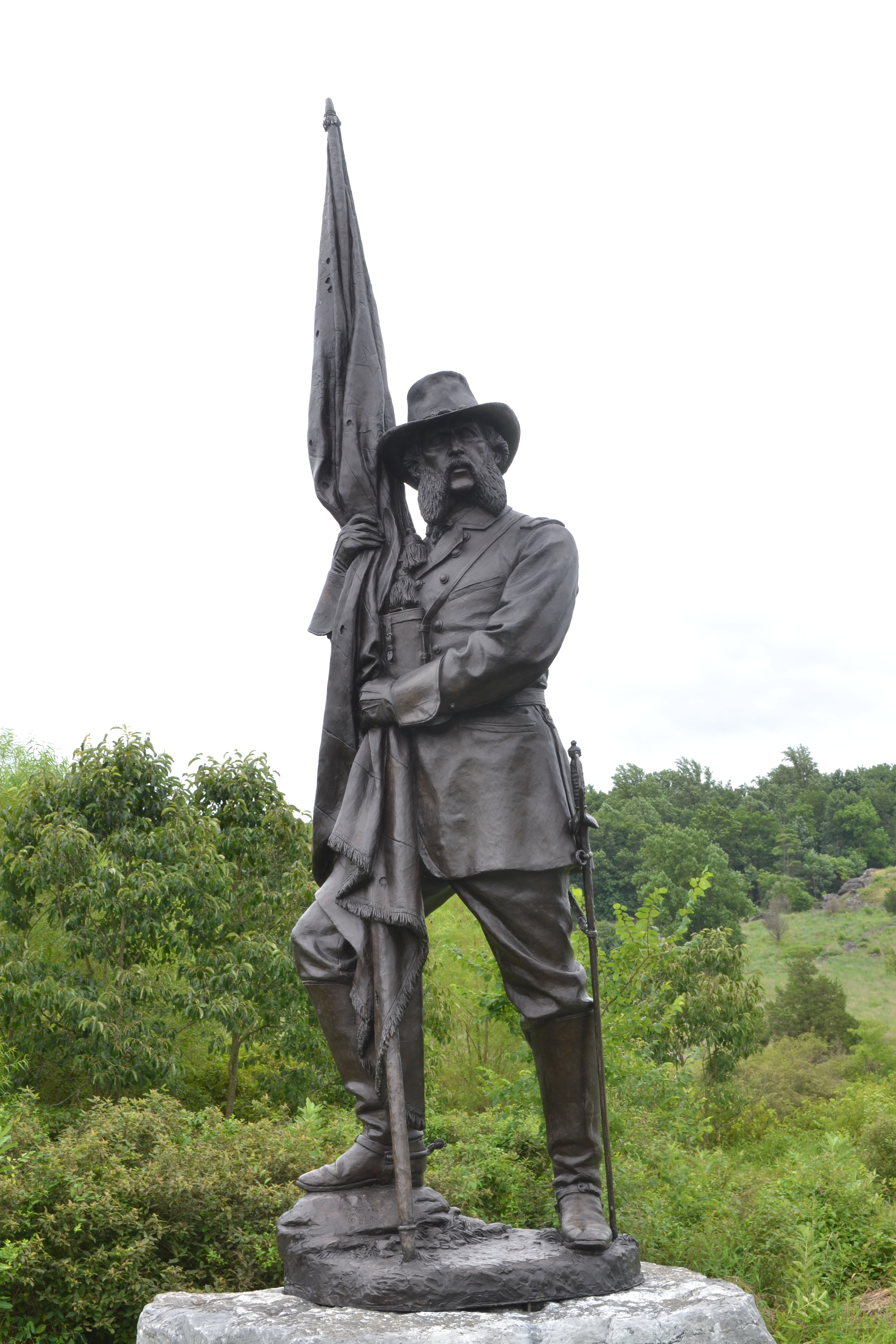
A statue of Crawford was dedicated at Gettysburg in 1988

Crawford remained in command of the Pennsylvania Reserve Division in the V Corps for the rest of the war. In the Richmond–Petersburg Campaign he also commanded a garrison in the siege that consisted of his first two brigades, a division from the IX Corps, and a few other regiments and artillery units; his third brigade was temporarily assigned to another V Corps division. On December 12, 1864, President Abraham Lincoln nominated Crawford for appointment to the brevet grade of major general, to rank from August 1, 1864, and the U.S. Senate confirmed the nomination on February 14, 1865. On August 18, he was wounded at the chest in the action at the Weldon Railroad. He received a brevet promotion to brigadier general in the regular army for the Battle of Five Forks and to major general on March 13, 1865. At Five Forks, his division drifted away through heavy woods from the main attack on the Confederate left. Maj. Gen. Gouverneur K. Warren, commander of V Corps, personally rode off to retrieve Crawford's division. His absence during the attack was one of the reasons cited by Maj. Gen. Philip Sheridan to relieve Warren. Although Crawford was the senior general in the corps, Sheridan named a more junior officer (Brig. Gen. Charles Griffin) to replace Warren.

Crawford was present for Robert E. Lee's surrender at Appomattox Court House in April 1865, making him one of the few soldiers to be present at both the beginning and the effective end of the Civil War.

== Postbellum life ==
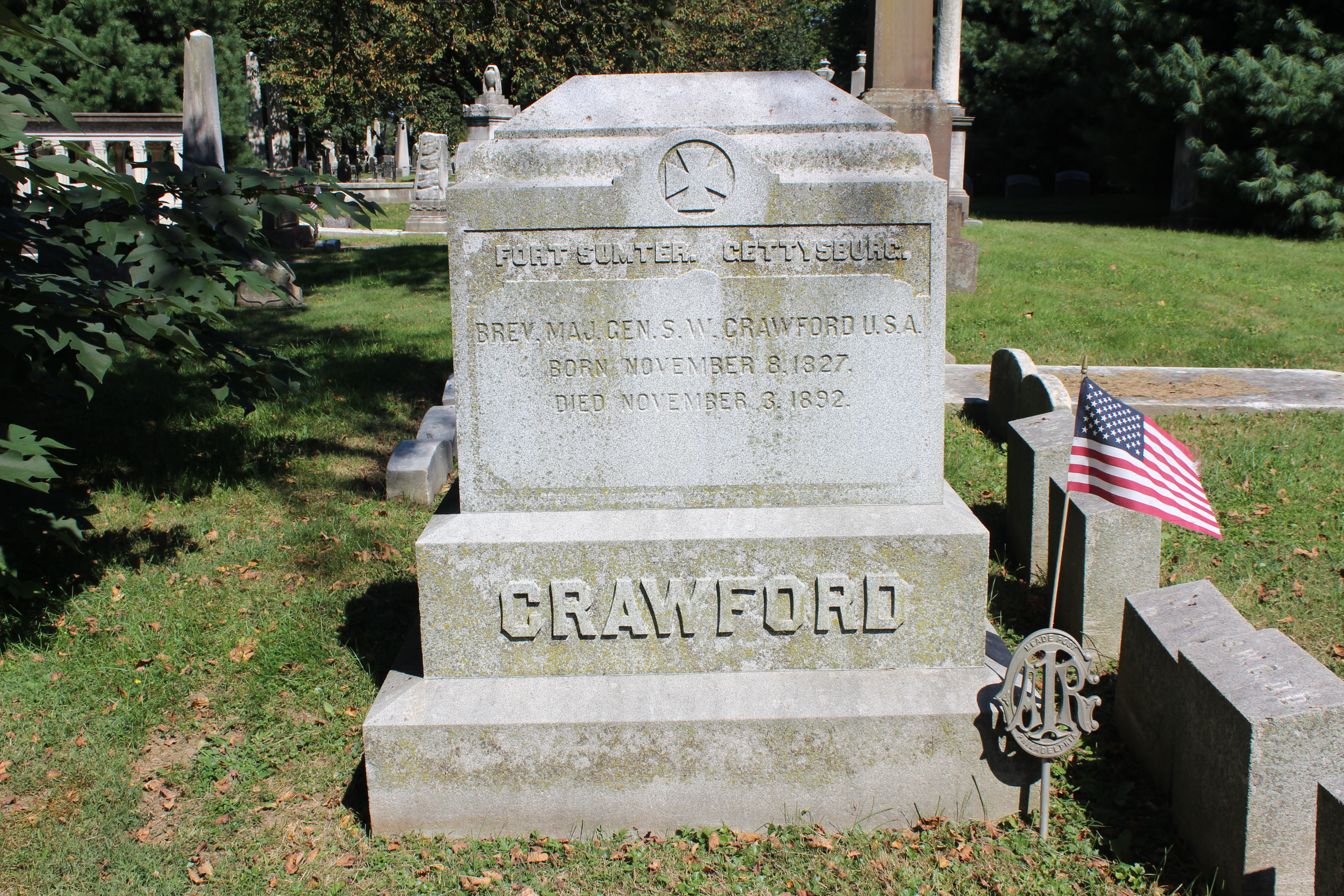
Samuel W. Crawford tombstone in Laurel Hill Cemetery

Crawford retired from the Army on February 19, 1873, and was given the rank of brigadier general, U.S. Army Retired. He authored the book The Genesis of the Civil War, published in 1887. He died in Philadelphia, Pennsylvania, and was interred in Laurel Hill Cemetery.

== Legacy ==
In 1988, a statue of Crawford was dedicated at Gettysburg depicting him clutching a bullet-riddled American flag.

== Bibliography ==
- The Genesis of the Civil War - The Story of Sumter 1860-1861, New York, Charles L. Webster & Company, 1887

== See also ==
- List of American Civil War generals (Union)

== Sources ==
- Eicher, John H. and David J. (2001). Civil War High Commands. Stanford University Press. ISBN 0-8047-3641-3.
- Salmon, John S. (2001). The Official Virginia Civil War Battlefield Guide. Stackpole Books. ISBN 0-8117-2868-4.
- Sommers, Richard J. (1981). Richmond Redeemed: The Siege at Petersburg. Savas Beatie LLC. ISBN 978-1-61121-210-5.
- Tagg, Larry (1998). The Generals of Gettysburg - The Leaders of America's Greatest Battle. Da Capo Press. ISBN 978-0-306-81242-2.
- Wittenberg, Eric J. (2002). Little Phil: A Reassessment of the Civil War Leadership of Gen. Philip H. Sheridan. Brassey's Inc. ISBN 1-57488-385-2.

Military offices
| Preceded by George Meade | Commander of the V Corps; October 7, 1863 – October 15, 1863 | Succeeded by George Sykes |
| Preceded by Gouverneur K. Warren | Commander of the V Corps; January 2, 1865 – January 27, 1865 | Succeeded by Gouverneur K. Warren |
