= Charles S. Lovell =

American military officer

Charles Swain Lovell
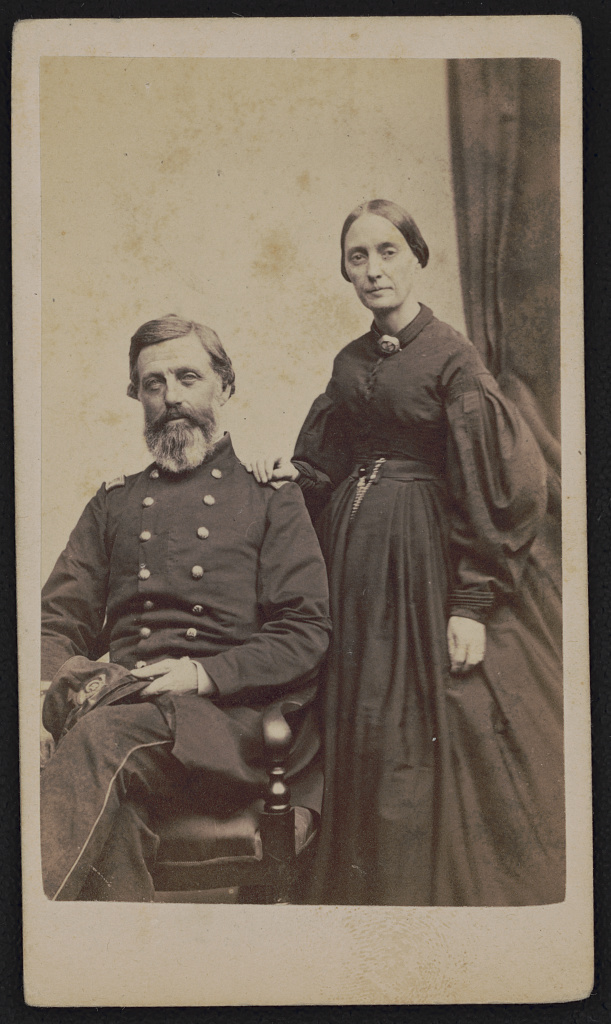
- Charles Swain Lovell and his Wife (Margaret Armstrong Lovell)
- Born: February 13, 1811; Hull, Massachusetts, U.S.
- Died: January 3, 1871 (aged 59); Louisville, Kentucky, U.S.
- Military career
- Allegiance: United States (Union)
- Branch: United States Army (Union Army)
- Service years: 1831 – 1870
- Rank: Colonel; Bvt. Brigadier General
- Units: 10th Infantry Regiment; 18th Infantry Regiment
- Commands: 14th Infantry Regiment; 2nd Bde., 2nd Div., V Corps
- Conflicts: See list: Second Seminole War; Mexican–American War; Mexico City campaign; Battle of Churubusco; Battle of Molino del Rey; Battle of Chapultepec; Battle for Mexico City; American Civil War; Peninsula campaign; Battle of Gaines' Mill; Battle of Malvern Hill; Northern Virginia campaign; Second Battle of Bull Run; Maryland campaign; Battle of Antietam; Fredericksburg campaign; Battle of Fredericksburg

Charles Swain Lovell (1811–1871) was an American military officer and Brevet Brigadier General who commanded a brigade during several major battles of the American Civil War.

== Biography ==
Lovell was born on February 13, 1811, in Hull, Massachusetts. He would enter military service in January 1831 by enlisting as a private in the 2nd United States Artillery Regiment. Lovell would go on to serve in various garrisons, rising to quartermaster-sergeant and then sergeant-major; and in October 1837 he was commissioned as 2nd Lieutenant. In July 1838 he was promoted to 1st Lieutenant.

=== Mexican–American War ===
On June 18, 1846, Lovell was promoted to captain in the 6th Infantry Regiment and was sent to fight in the Mexican–American War. He participated in the Battle of Churubusco, the Battle of Molino del Rey, the Battle of Chapultepec and finally the Battle for Mexico City. After the war, Lovell would remain in the new territories until the outbreak of the American Civil War.

=== American Civil War ===
When the American Civil War began, Lovell was promoted to major of the 10th Infantry Regiment on May 14, 1861. When the V Corps was established in early 1862 Lovell occasionally was in command of the Second Brigade of the Second Division, one of the two brigades of regular infantry in Army of the Potomac, as ranking officer. Lovell saw combat at the Battle of Gaines' Mill and the subsequent fighting at the Battle of Malvern Hill, during the Peninsula Campaign. Lovell then served at the Second Battle of Bull Run, the Battle of Antietam, and the Battle of Fredericksburg.

For the rest of the war, from 1863 to 1865, he was on provost-marshal duty in Wisconsin. He also was transferred and promoted to lieutenant-colonel of the 18th Infantry Regiment on January 21, 1863, and to Colonel of the 14th Infantry Regiment on February 16, 1865. On March 13, 1865, he was Brevetted Brigadier General for "gallant service at the Battle of Antietam".

=== Later years ===
After the American Civil War ended, he was stationed along with his regiment at Fort Yuma, California, and on December 15, 1870, he submitted his retirement. He remained at Louisville, Kentucky until dying from a heart attack on January 3, 1871.

== See also ==
- List of American Civil War brevet generals (Union)
