= Pennsylvania Reserves =

Union army infantry division

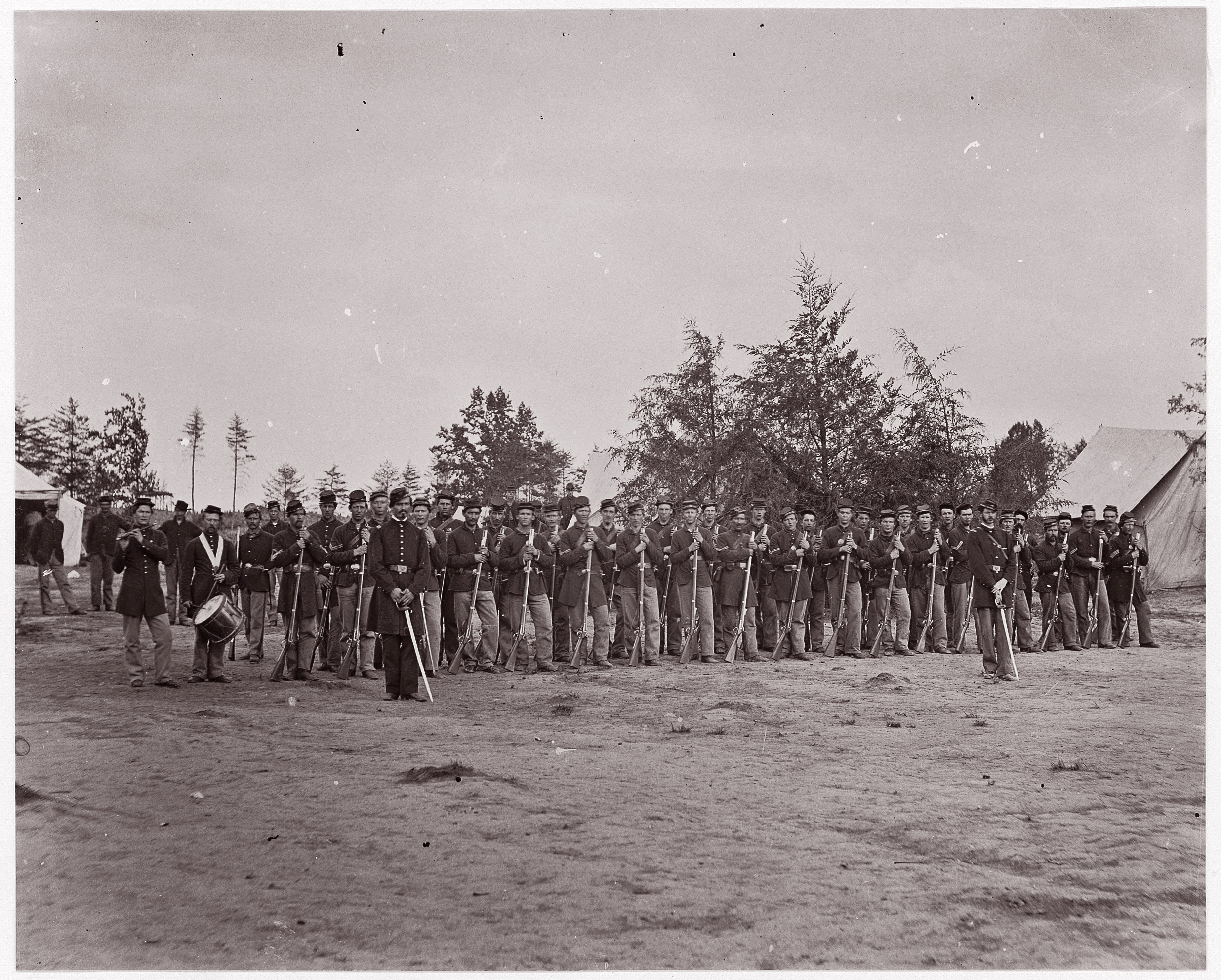
30th Pennsylvania Infantry

The Pennsylvania Reserves were an infantry division of the Union army during the American Civil War. Noted for its famous commanders and high casualties, it served in the Eastern Theater, and fought in many important battles, including Antietam and Gettysburg.

== Organization ==
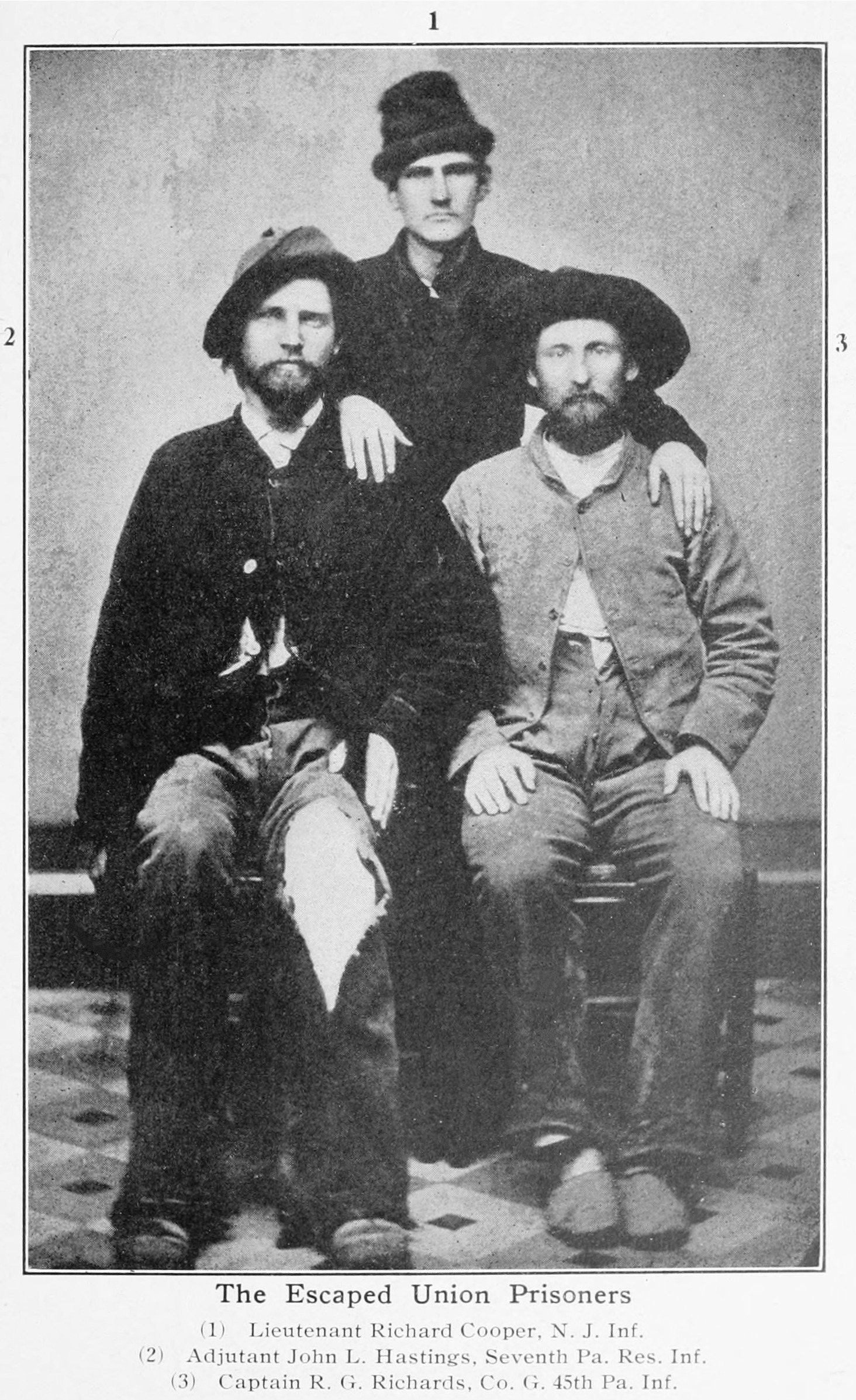
March 17, 1865 photo of three Union soldiers who escaped Confederate Prison Camp including Lieutenant Richard Cooper New Jersey Infantry, Adjudant John J. Hastings 7th Pennsylvania Reserve Infantry, and Captain Rees G. Richards Company G 45th Pennsylvania Infantry.

When President Abraham Lincoln called for volunteers to "put down the rebellion" in the spring of 1861, the commonwealth of Pennsylvania found itself with more volunteers than needed to meet its Federal quota. Although 14 regiments were requested, Pennsylvania exceeded this by providing 25 organized regiments. The Secretary of War, Simon Cameron, was a political enemy of Andrew Curtin, Pennsylvania governor, and refused to take the extra men into Federal service. Curtin decided to retain the extra men and organized, trained, and equipped them at state expense. The creation of the special division was approved by the Pennsylvania legislature on May 15, 1861, "for the purpose of suppressing insurrections, or to repel invasions." The men were trained at camps of instruction in four cities: Easton, Pittsburgh, West Chester, and Harrisburg. The training camp near Harrisburg was named Camp Curtin for the governor.

Fifteen regiments were formed, known as the 1st through 15th Pennsylvania Reserves (they were later designated the 30th through 44th Pennsylvania Volunteers, but generally retained the label of the Pennsylvania Reserves). At the time of the redesignation, Pennsylvania had other troops both in the field or in various stages of development using the same numbers. While many of these units used their designations into middle and late 1862, much confusion arose over the naming convention. Additional naming confusion occurred within the ranks of the reserves. The 13th Pennsylvania Reserve Regiment (42nd Pennsylvania Volunteers) was additionally named the 1st Pennsylvania Rifles. Although better known as the "Bucktails," this regiment became officially known as the First Rifles. The same can be said regarding the 14th and 15th Pennsylvania Reserves (43rd and 44th Pennsylvania Volunteers), which officially were designated as the 1st Pennsylvania Light Artillery and the 1st Pennsylvania Cavalry, respectively.

The regiments were grouped into a division of three brigades, and the entire unit normally fought together until the initial enlistments expired in 1864. The exceptions to this include the 2nd Brigade, most of which did not take part at Gettysburg, as it was assigned to the Washington, D.C., defenses, and the detachment of several artillery batteries and cavalry troops to other divisions.

== Command history ==
The first commander was George A. McCall, and later division commanders were John F. Reynolds, George G. Meade, and Samuel W. Crawford. Truman Seymour twice was acting commander, once on the Peninsula and once at Antietam, when Meade became acting commander of I Corps. The initial brigade commanders were Reynolds, Meade, and Colonel John S. McCalmont (until Edward Otho Cresap Ord took official command of the 3rd Brigade).

Commander	Date	Official Designation	Major Battles
George A. McCall	3 Oct 1861–13 Mar 1862	McCall's Div, Army of the Potomac	
George A. McCall	13 Mar-12 June 1862	2nd Division, I Corps	
George A. McCall	18–30 June 1862	3rd Division, V Corps	Mechanicsville, Gaines Mill, Glendale
Truman Seymour	30 June-26 Aug 1862	3rd Division, V Corps	Malvern Hill
John F. Reynolds	26 Aug-12 Sept 1862	3rd Division, III Corps (Army of VA)	Second Bull Run
George G. Meade	12-17 Sept 1862	3rd Division, I Corps	South Mountain, Antietam
Truman Seymour	17-29 Sept 1862	3rd Division, I Corps	Antietam
George G. Meade	29 Sept-25 Dec 1862	3rd Division, I Corps	Fredericksburg
Horatio G. Sickel	25 Dec 1862-1 June 1863	Pennsylvania Reserves, XXII Corps	
Samuel W. Crawford	1–28 June 1863	Pennsylvania Reserves, XXII Corps	
Samuel W. Crawford	28 June-28 Aug 1863	3rd Division, V Corps	Gettysburg
William McCandless	28 Aug-1 Nov 1863	3rd Division, V Corps	
Samuel W. Crawford	1 Nov 1863-20 Feb 1864	3rd Division, V Corps	
William McCandless	20 Feb-1 May 1864	3rd Division, V Corps	
Samuel W. Crawford	1 May-2 June 1864	3rd Division, V Corps	Wilderness, Spotsylvania, Totopotomoy Creek

== History ==
Initially assigned to I Corps, in June 1862, the division was transferred to the Virginia Peninsula where it served with the V Corps of the Army of the Potomac during the Peninsula Campaign. The division then returned to its old corps (which was at the time designated III Corps in the Army of Virginia) during the Second Bull Run Campaign. The division's parent formation resumed its I Corps designation just prior to the Antietam campaign when it rejoined the Army of the Potomac. The division participated in the battles of South Mountain, Antietam, and Fredericksburg, particularly distinguishing itself at Fredericksburg, where it penetrated the Confederate lines. Between Fredericksburg and Gettysburg, the division was a part of the XXII Corps assigned to Washington, D.C. It was part of the V Corps again for the Battle of Gettysburg, where it distinguished itself on July 2, 1863, fighting around Little Round Top. One brigade drove Confederate forces from the western slopes of Little Round Top back to the Wheatfield. Under Crawford, the Pennsylvania Reserves continued to fight with the Army of the Potomac until just before the Battle of the Bethesda Church or Battle of Totopotomoy Creek, when the men's three-year enlistments expired.

A large number of the men re-enlisted and became the 190th and 191st Volunteer Infantry regiments and fought until the end of the war.

== Regimental articles ==
- 1st Pennsylvania Reserve Regiment (30th Penna. Volunteer Infantry)
- 2nd Pennsylvania Reserve Regiment (31st Penna. Volunteer Infantry)
- 3rd Pennsylvania Reserve Regiment (32nd Penna. Volunteer Infantry)
- 4th Pennsylvania Reserve Regiment (33rd Penna. Volunteer Infantry)
- 5th Pennsylvania Reserve Regiment (34th Penna. Volunteer Infantry)
- 6th Pennsylvania Reserve Regiment (35th Penna. Volunteer Infantry)
- 7th Pennsylvania Reserve Regiment (36th Penna. Volunteer Infantry)
- 8th Pennsylvania Reserve Regiment (37th Penna. Volunteer Infantry)
- 9th Pennsylvania Reserve Regiment (38th Penna. Volunteer Infantry)
- 10th Pennsylvania Reserve Regiment (39th Penna. Volunteer Infantry)
- 11th Pennsylvania Reserve Regiment (40th Penna. Volunteer Infantry)
- 12th Pennsylvania Reserve Regiment (41st Penna. Volunteer Infantry)
- 13th Pennsylvania Reserve Regiment (42nd Penna. Volunteer Infantry—1st Pennsylvania Rifles, the "Bucktails")
- 14th Pennsylvania Reserve Regiment (43rd Penna. Volunteers—1st Pennsylvania Light Artillery)
  - Battery A, 1st Pennsylvania Light Artillery
  - Battery B, 1st Pennsylvania Light Artillery
  - Battery C, 1st Pennsylvania Light Artillery
  - Battery D, 1st Pennsylvania Light Artillery
  - Battery F, 1st Pennsylvania Light Artillery
- 15th Pennsylvania Reserve Regiment (44th Penna. Volunteers—1st Pennsylvania Cavalry)
