= George W. Morell =

American engineer, lawyer, farmer and Union general (1815–1883)

George Webb Morell
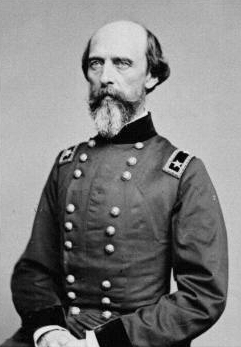
- George W. Morell
- Born: January 8, 1815; Cooperstown, New York
- Died: February 11, 1883 (aged 68); Scarborough, New York
- Burial place: St. Mary's Episcopal Church, Scarborough, New York
- Military career
- Allegiance: United States (Union)
- Branch: United States Army; Union Army
- Service years: 1835–1837, 1861–1864
- Rank: Brigadier General; Major General (temporary)
- Conflicts: American Civil War; Peninsula campaign; Battle of Yorktown; Battle of Hanover Court House; Seven Days Battles; Battle of Beaver Dam Creek; Battle of Gaines' Mill; Battle of Malvern Hill; Northern Virginia campaign; Second Battle of Bull Run; Maryland campaign; Battle of Antietam

George Webb Morell (January 8, 1815 – February 11, 1883) was a civil engineer, lawyer, farmer, and a Union general in the American Civil War.

== Early life ==
Morell was born in Cooperstown, New York. His father was George Morell, the chief justice of the Michigan Supreme Court. He graduated from the United States Military Academy, first in his class of 56 cadets, in 1835 and was commissioned a brevet second lieutenant in the Corps of Engineers. He resigned from the Army on June 30, 1837, and became a civil engineer for the Charleston and Cincinnati Railroad and later for the Michigan Central Railroad. He moved to New York City in 1839 and worked as a lawyer. He was a commissioner for the circuit court of the Southern District of New York from 1854 to 1861.

== Civil War ==
Since 1852, Morell had served as a colonel in the New York Militia. He was promoted to brigadier general of volunteers on August 9, 1861, and served in brigade and division command in the Army of the Potomac during the Peninsula Campaign. Morell led the 1st Division, V Corps, during most of this period. His close association with Brig. Gen. Fitz John Porter, his corps commander, negatively affected his career prospects, as Porter was court-martialed for dereliction in the Second Battle of Bull Run. Morell testified on Porter's behalf at the court-martial, effectively ruining his military career. After the Battle of Antietam, he saw no additional field service. Morell was appointed a major general on July 4, 1862, but the appointment expired the following year without confirmation by the United States Senate. He commanded the Draft Depot in Indianapolis, Indiana, for most of 1864 and was mustered out from volunteer service on December 15, 1864.

== Postbellum ==
Morell worked as a farmer after his military service. He died in Scarborough, New York, and is buried there in the chancel of St. Mary's Episcopal Church.

== See also ==
- List of American Civil War generals (Union)
