= Battery D, 1st Pennsylvania Light Artillery =

Light artillery battery of the Union Army

- Active: August 5, 1861 - June 30, 1865
- Country: United States
- Allegiance: Union
- Branch: Artillery
- Engagements: Siege of Yorktown; Battle of Williamsburg; Battle of Seven Pines; Seven Days Battles; Battle of Savage's Station; Battle of Malvern Hill; Battle of Antietam; Battle of Fredericksburg; Third Battle of Winchester; Battle of Fisher's Hill; Battle of Cedar Creek

Battery D, 1st Pennsylvania Light Artillery was a light artillery battery that served in the Union Army as part of the Pennsylvania Reserves infantry division during the American Civil War.

== Service ==
The battery was organized at Philadelphia, Pennsylvania and mustered in for a three-year enlistment on August 5, 1861, under the command of Captain Edward H. Flood.

The battery was attached to Buell's Division, Army of the Potomac, October 1861 to March 1862. Artillery, 1st Division, IV Corps, Army of the Potomac, to September 1862. Artillery, 3rd Division, VI Corps, Army of the Potomac, to May 1863. Artillery Brigade, VI Corps, to June 1863. Camp Barry, Defenses of Washington, D.C., to August 1863. Unattached, Artillery, Department of West Virginia, to December 1863. 1st Brigade, 1st Division, Department of West Virginia, to January 1864. Wheaton's Brigade, Department of West Virginia, to April 1864. Artillery Brigade, Department of West Virginia, to January 1865. 1st Separate Brigade, Department of West Virginia, to May 1865. 2nd Infantry Division, Department of West Virginia, to June 1865.

Battery D, 1st Pennsylvania Light Artillery mustered out on June 30, 1865.

== Detailed service ==
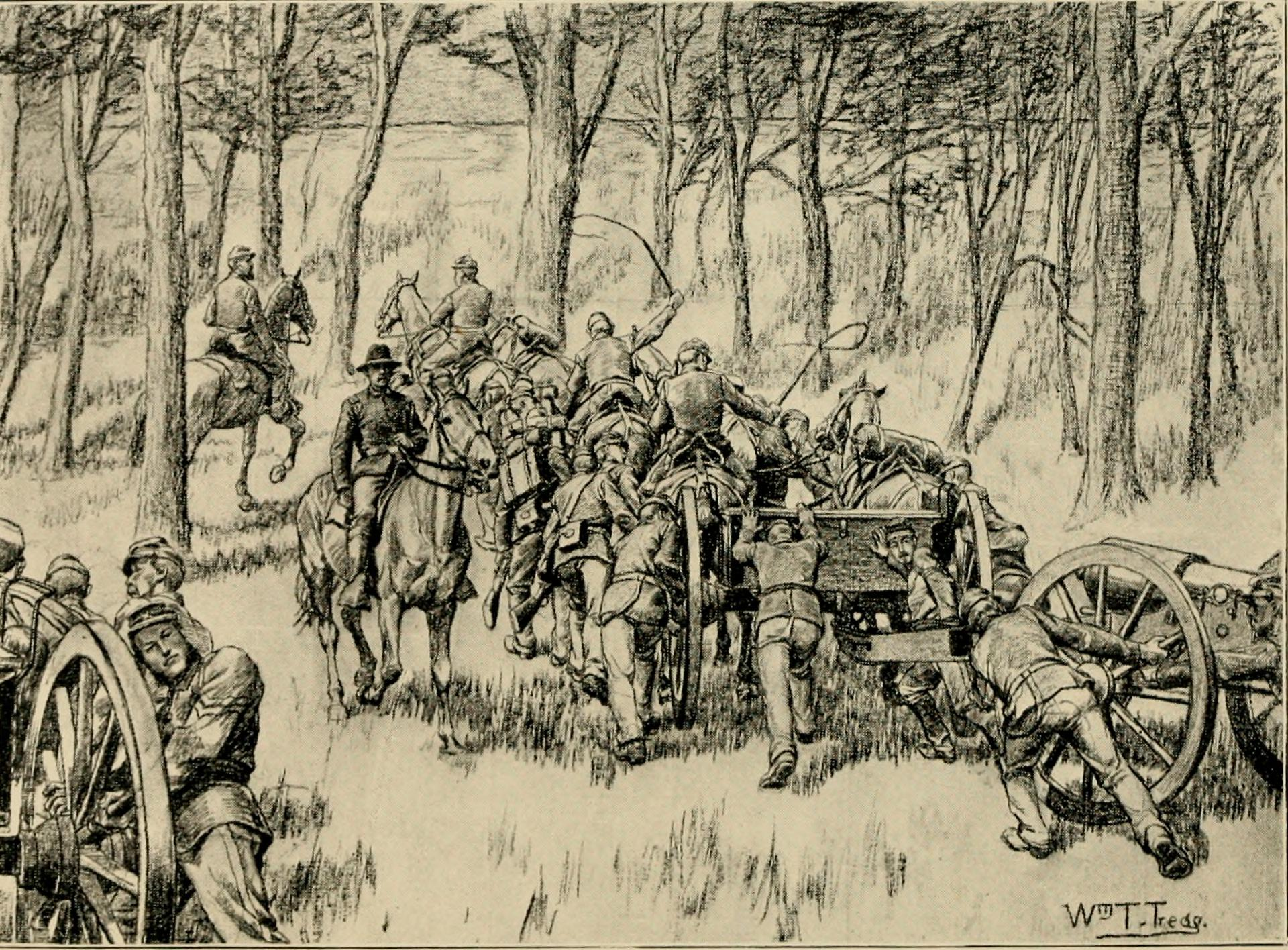
Battery D, Pennsylvania Volunteer Artillery on their way to the Antietam.

Moved to Washington, D.C., August 1861. Duty in the defenses of Washington, D.C., until March 1862. Ordered to the Virginia Peninsula March. Siege of Yorktown April 5-May 4. Battle of Williamsburg May 5. Battle of Fair Oaks, Seven Pines, May 31-June 1. Seven Days Battles before Richmond June 25-July 1. James River Road near Fair Oaks June 29. Charles City Cross Roads June 29. Malvern Hill July 1. At Harrison's Landing until August 16. Movement to join Pope August 16–26. Sulphur Springs August 26. Maryland Campaign September. Battle of Antietam, September 16–17. Duty in Maryland until October 29. Moved to Falmouth, Va., October 29-November 19. Battle of Fredericksburg December 12–15. "Mud March" January 20–24, 1863. At Falmouth until April. Chancellorsville Campaign April 27-May 6. Operations at Franklin's Crossing April 29-May 2. Maryes Heights, Fredericksburg, May 3. Salem Heights May 3–4. Banks' Ford May 4. Ordered to Washington, D.C., June, and duty at Camp Barry until August. Ordered to Harpers Ferry, W. Va., and duty there until August 1864. Sheridan's Shenandoah Valley Campaign August to November. Berryville September 3. Battle of Opequan, Winchester, September 19. Fisher's Hill September 22. Battle of Cedar Creek October 19. Duty at Maryland Heights and in Department of West Virginia until June 1865.

== Casualties ==
The battery lost a total of 30 men during service; 11 enlisted men killed or mortally wounded, 1 officers and 18 enlisted men died of disease.

== Commanders ==
- Captain Edward H. Flood - promoted to lieutenant colonel of the regiment July 19, 1862
- Captain Michael Hall - resigned March 21, 1863
- Captain Andrew Rosney - resigned September 6, 1864
- Captain William Munk
- Quartermaster Sergeant Samuel Humes

== See also ==
- List of Pennsylvania Civil War Units
- Pennsylvania in the Civil War
