= 7th Pennsylvania Reserve Regiment =

Union Army infantry regiment

- Pennsylvania flag
- Active: June 6, 1861, to June 16, 1864
- Country: United States
- Allegiance: Union
- Branch: Infantry
- Engagements: Battle of Mechanicsville; Battle of Gaines' Mill; Battle of Glendale; Battle of Malvern Hill; Battle of Second Bull Run; Battle of South Mountain; Battle of Antietam; Battle of Fredericksburg; Battle of the Wilderness; Battle of Laurel Hill; Battle of Spottsylvania Court House; Battle of North Anna; Battle of Totopotomoy Creek

The 7th Pennsylvania Reserve Regiment, also known as the 36th Regiment Pennsylvania Volunteer Infantry, was a regiment in the Union Army during the American Civil War. It formed part of the Pennsylvania Reserve division in the Army of the Potomac for most of the war. The regiment served in a number of important battles throughout the Eastern Theater, including Antietam and Fredericksburg.

== Organization ==
Company	Moniker	Primary Location of Recruitment	Captains
A	The Carlisle Fencibles	Cumberland County	R.M. Henderson
B	The Biddle Rifles	Perry County	John Jameson
C	The Iron Artillery	Lebanon County	E.G. Lantz
D	The Rifle Guards	Clinton County	Chauncy A. Lyman
E	The Ridgway Guards	Philadelphia	Chas. S. Peall
F	The Wyoming Bank Infantry	Luzerne County	Elisha B. Harvey
G	The Second Philadelphia Guards	Philadelphia	John G. Chapman
H	The Cumberland Guards	Cumberland County	Joseph Totten
I	The Myerstown Rifles	Lebanon County	Jerome Myers
K	The Douglas Guards	Philadelphia	Casper Martino

== Service ==
The 7th Pennsylvania Reserves were organized at Camp Curtin in Harrisburg, Pennsylvania. They were ordered to Washington, D.C., on July 21 and mustered into United States service July 27, 1861. Elisha B. Harvey, of Wilkes-Barre, Pennsylvania, served as the regiment's first colonel, Joseph Totten as lieutenant colonel and Chauncey A. Lyman as major. It was sent to Washington, D.C., where the division was assigned to the I Corps of the Army of the Potomac. The I Corps remained in northern Virginia instead of following the rest of the Army for the Peninsula Campaign in 1862. In May, due to Maj. Gen. George B. McClellan's demands for reinforcements, the division was sent the Peninsula as well.

In August 1862, the Army of the Potomac was transferred to northern Virginia to support the Army of Virginia. The 7th Pennsylvania Reserves then fought at Turner's Gap in the Battle of South Mountain, at the Battle of Antietam, and at the Battle of Fredericksburg on December 12. The Seventh Reserves distinguished themselves at Fredericksburg by capturing over 100 of the enemy, along with the battle flag of the Nineteenth Georgia Infantry, the only trophy seized during the battle.

At the Battle of the Wilderness, on May 5, 1864, the entire regiment—except for Company B—found itself hopelessly surrounded by Confederate troops, and was compelled to surrender. 272 officers and men were captured, and were immediately marched to the rear of the rebel army at Orange Court House, and thence to Lynchburg, Virginia. The enlisted men were speedily conveyed to the infamous rebel prison pen at Andersonville, Georgia, and the officers were sent to Camp Oglethorpe in Macon, Georgia, and were subsequently placed under fire of Union guns at Charleston, for the protection of the city. The prisoners were held until the end of the conflict was near, with some being paroled, and some liberated by Union troops, but with many enlisted dying from starvation, disease and exposure in the period leading up to release.

The regiment was mustered out on June 16, 1864.

== Casualties ==
The 7th Pennsylvania Reserves lost 3 officers and 80 enlisted men killed and mortally wounded in battle, and 135 enlisted men dead for reasons not directly caused in action (disease, etc.)—67 of these at Andersonville, and an undetermined number after the captives were moved to Florence, South Carolina, totalling 218 fatalities.

== Commanders ==
- Col. Elisha B. Harvey, June 26, 1861, to July 4, 1862 (resigned)
- Col. Henry C. Bolinger (Capt. of Company D 6/26/1861, to Lt. Col. 5/5/1862, then Col. 8/1/1862; captured at the Wilderness, May 5, 1864; sent to Macon, GA)
- Capt. Samuel B. King (of Company H), May 1864 to June 16, 1864 (mustered out)

== See also ==
- Pennsylvania Reserves
- Pennsylvania in the Civil War
