= Battle of Glendale =

1862 battle of the American Civil War

- Part of the American Civil War
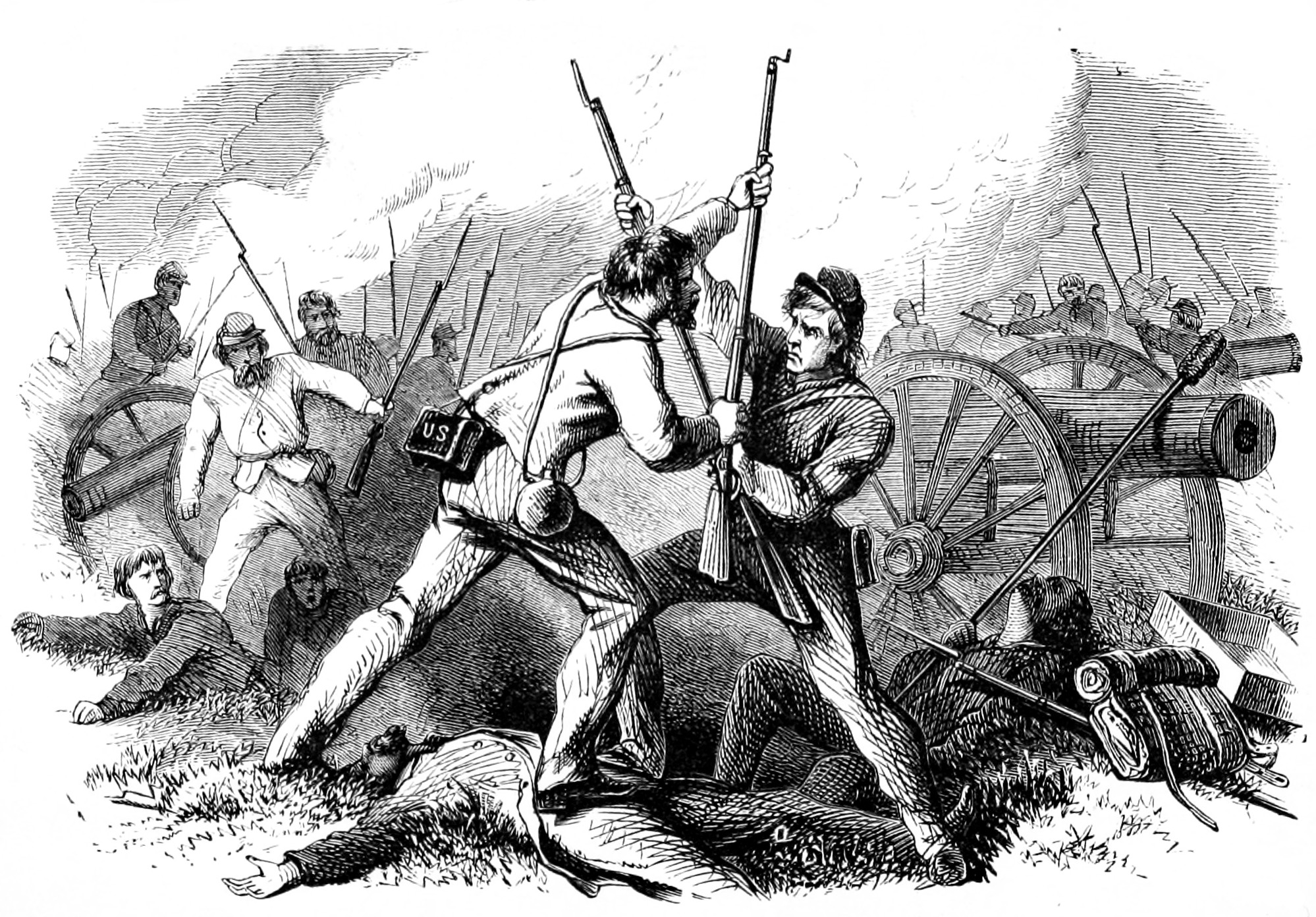
- Contest around McCall's Cannons
Date	June 30, 1862
Location	Henrico County, Virginia 37.43791°N 77.23812°W
Result	Inconclusive

Belligerents
United States (Union)	(Confederate States of America) Confederate States (Confederacy)

Commanders and leaders
George B. McClellan	Robert E. Lee

Units involved
Army of the Potomac	Army of Northern Virginia

Strength
40,000	45,000

Casualties and losses
3,797 total (297 killed 1,696 wounded 1,804 missing or captured)	3,673 total (638 killed 2,814 wounded 221 missing)

The Battle of Glendale, also known as the Battle of Frayser's Farm, Frazier's Farm, Nelson's Farm, Charles City Crossroads, New Market Road, or Riddell's Shop, took place on June 30, 1862, in Henrico County, Virginia, on the sixth day of the Seven Days Battles (Peninsula campaign) of the American Civil War.

Following the Battle of Gaines' Mill, Union Major General George B. McClellan ordered his Army of the Potomac to withdraw from its positions along the Chickahominy River and redeploy to a new base along the James River, under the protective fire of Union gunboats.

After the enemy disappeared in his front, Confederate General Robert E. Lee reasoned that McClellan was most likely retreating toward the James River and devised a plan to catch the Army of the Potomac in transit and destroy it. Gambling that the Federal force would be slowed and spread out while traversing the boggy White Oak Swamp, Lee ordered his divisions of the Army of Northern Virginia, under the field command of Major Generals Benjamin Huger, James Longstreet, and A.P. Hill, to move up quickly and simultaneously converge upon the Federal troops and supply train where they would likely emerge from the swamp and turn southward toward Malvern Hill, bisecting the front and rear of the column in the vicinity of White Oak Swamp Bridge and Glendale (or Frayser's Farm), respectively, and attempting to execute a double envelopment in the fashion of the Battle of Cannae to destroy McClellan in detail.

The coordinated assault envisioned by Lee failed to materialize due to difficulties encountered by Huger and lackluster efforts made by Major General Thomas J. "Stonewall" Jackson, but successful attacks made by Longstreet and Hill near the Glendale crossroad penetrated the Union defenses near Willis Church and temporarily breached the line. Union counterattacks sealed the breach and turned the Confederates back, repulsing their attack upon the line of retreat along the Willis Church/Quaker Road through brutal close-quarters hand-to-hand fighting. North of Glendale, Huger's advance was stopped on the Charles City Road. Near the White Oak Swamp Bridge, the divisions led by Jackson were simultaneously delayed by Union Brigadier General William B. Franklin's corps at White Oak Swamp. South of Glendale near Malvern Hill, Confederate Major General Theophilus H. Holmes made a feeble attempt to attack the Union left flank at Turkey Bridge but was driven back.

The battle was Lee's best chance to cut off the Union Army from the safety of the James River, and his efforts to bisect the Federal line failed. The Army of the Potomac successfully retreated to the James, and that night, the Union army established a strong position on Malvern Hill.

== Background ==
=== Military situation ===
The Seven Days Battles began with a Union attack in the minor Battle of Oak Grove on June 25, 1862, but McClellan quickly lost the initiative as Lee began a series of attacks at Beaver Dam Creek (Mechanicsville) on June 26, Gaines' Mill on June 27, the minor actions at Garnett's and Golding's Farm on June 27 and June 28, and the attack on the Union rear guard at Savage's Station on June 29. McClellan's Army of the Potomac continued its retreat toward the safety of Harrison's Landing on the James River.

After Gaines' Mill, McClellan left his army with no clear instructions regarding routes of withdrawal and without naming a second-in-command. The bulk of the V Corps (less the Third Division), under Brigadier General Fitz John Porter, moved to occupy Malvern Hill, while the remaining four corps of the Army of the Potomac were essentially operating independently in their fighting withdrawal. Most elements of the army had been able to cross White Oak Swamp Creek by noon on June 30. About one third of the army had reached the James River, but the remainder was still marching between White Oak Swamp and Glendale. (Glendale was the name of a tiny community at the intersection of the Charles City, New Market/Long Bridge, and Quaker [or Willis Church] Roads, which led over Malvern Hill to the James River.) After inspecting the line of march that morning, McClellan rode south and boarded the ironclad USS Galena on the James River.

Leaving the White Oak Swamp and traveling westward on the Long Bridge/New Market Road, the units of the Army of the Potomac made a 90-degree southward turn near the Glendale crossroad toward the James River, and this vulnerable junction was therefore a target of primary defensive importance. To protect the Army of the Potomac in transit, McClellan's corps commanders deployed divisions north-south in a defensive position along the Quaker Road and Charles City Road to protect against an eastward thrust by Lee's Army of North Virginia until the Army of the Potomac had arrived safely at Malvern Hill.

Lee ordered his Army of Northern Virginia to converge upon the retreating Union forces, bottlenecked on the inadequate road network. The Army of the Potomac, lacking overall command coherence, presented a discontinuous, ragged defensive line. Jackson was ordered to press the Union rear guard at the White Oak Swamp crossing while the largest part of Lee's army, some 45,000 men, would attack the Army of the Potomac in mid-retreat at Glendale, about 2 miles (3.2 km) southwest, splitting it in two. Huger's division was to strike first after a three-mile (5 km) march on the Charles City Road, supported by Longstreet and A. P. Hill, whose divisions were about 7 miles (11 km) to the west, in a mass attack. Holmes was ordered to cannonade retreating Federals near Malvern Hill.

== Opposing forces ==
=== Union ===
Key Union Commanders
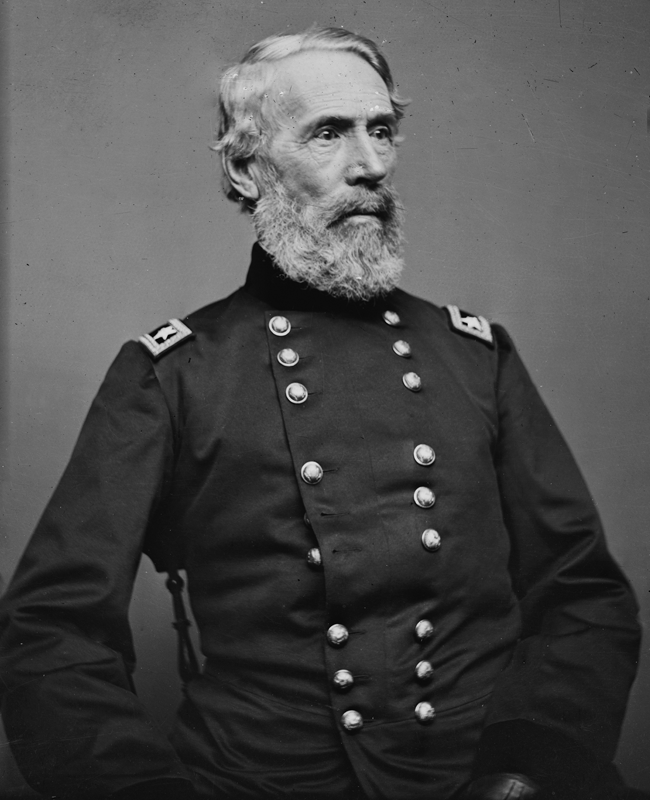
Brig. Gen.
Edwin V. Sumner

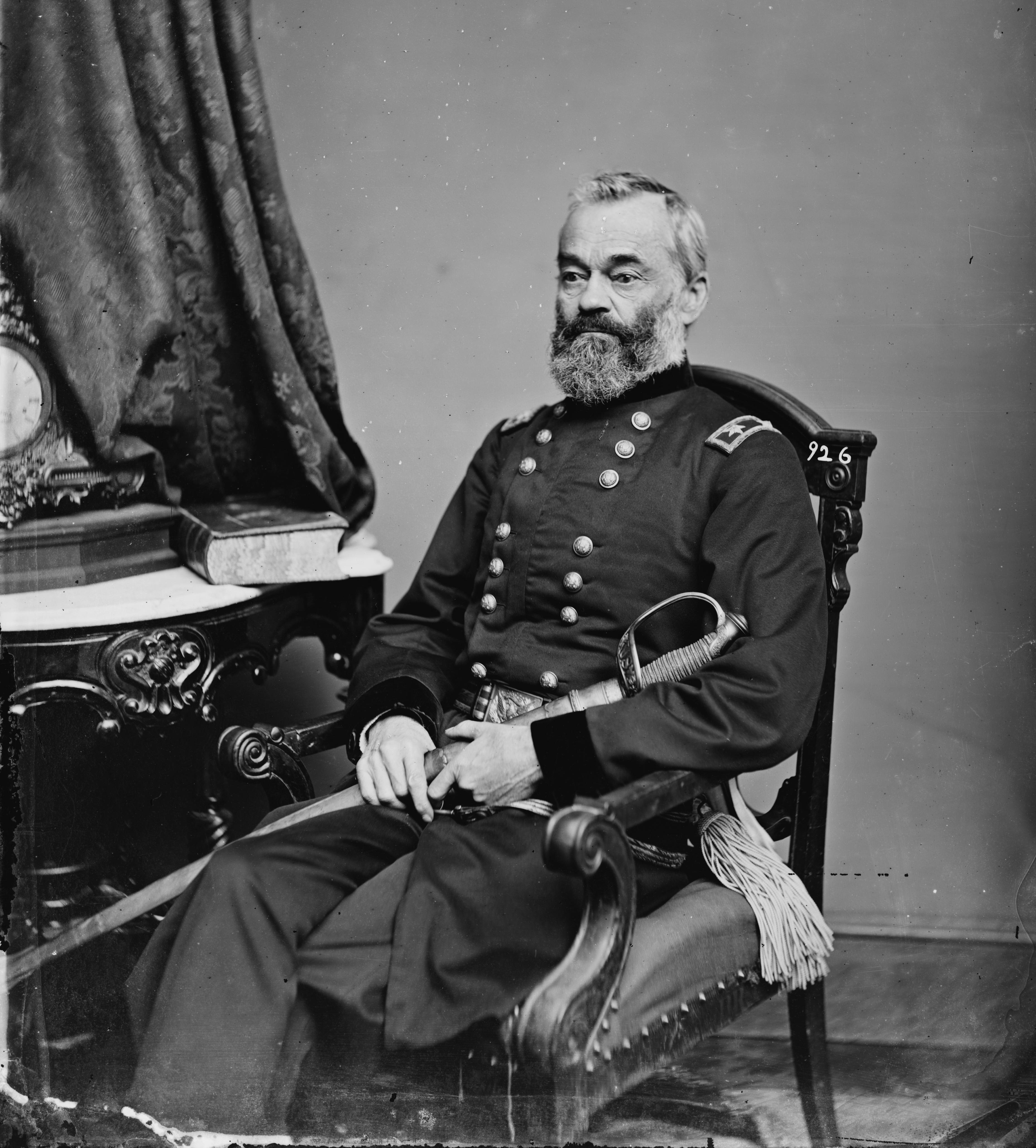
Brig. Gen.
Samuel P. Heintzelman

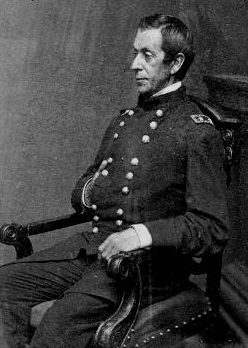
Brig. Gen.
George A. McCall

== Battle ==
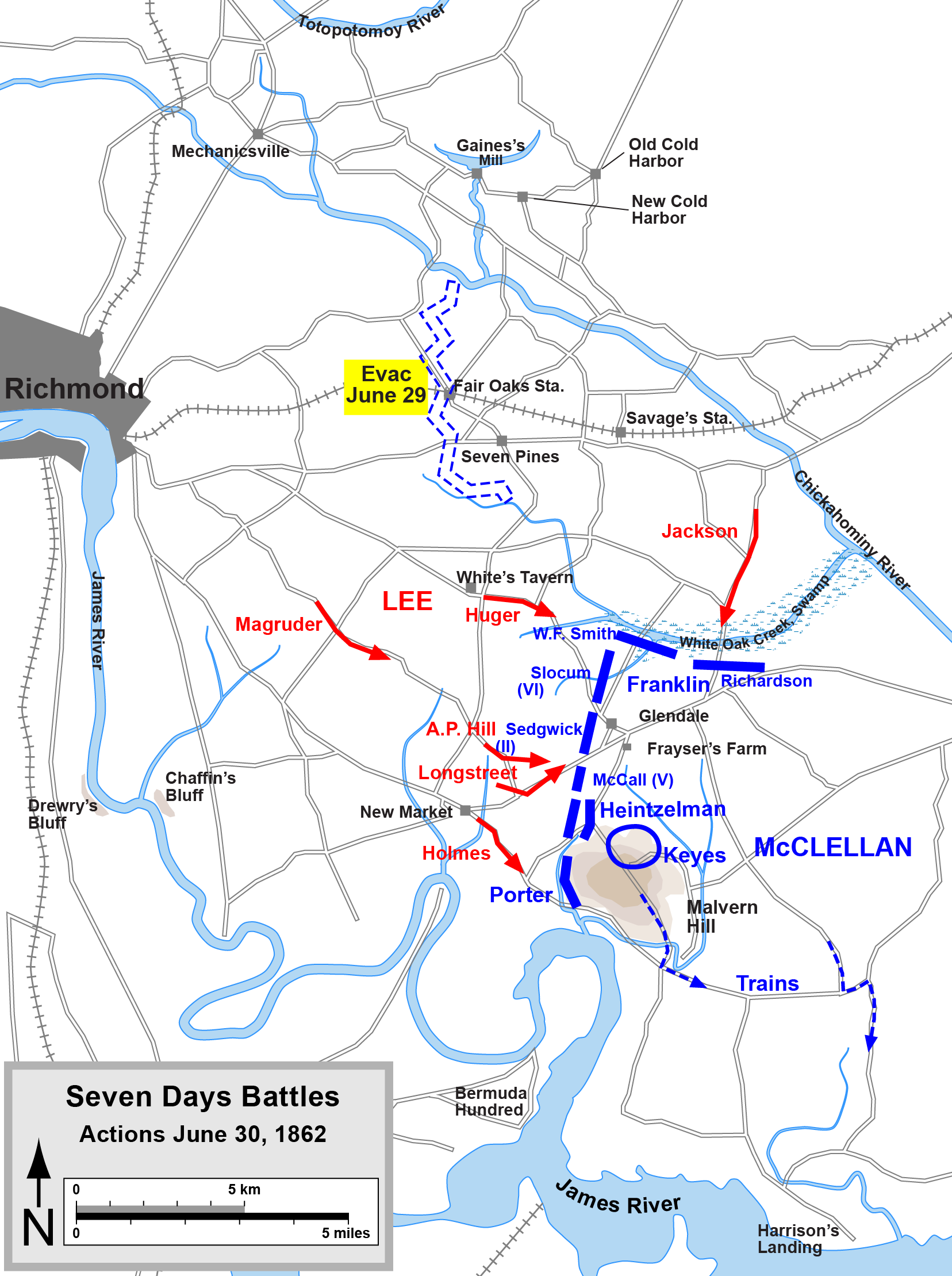
Path of the Army of the Potomac retreat and order of battle at Glendale, June 30, 1862

Lee's intended simultaneous thrust against the entire flank of the Union Army of the Potomac in transit failed to materialize on June 30; as with many of the Seven Days Battles, Lee's elaborate grand strategy was poorly executed by his commanders, who were unable to coordinate the intricate details in the field.

From the northwest, Major General Benjamin Huger was slowed by felled trees obstructing the Charles City Road, the result of the efforts made by pioneers from Brigadier General Henry W. Slocum's division to halt his advance. Rather than clearing the path, Huger had his men spend hours cutting a new road through the thick woods in what became known as the "Battle of the Axes". He failed to take any alternative route and, fearing a counterattack, failed to participate in the battle.

To the south, Major General Theophilus Holmes's inexperienced troops (from his Department of North Carolina, attached to the Army of Northern Virginia) made no progress against Porter at Turkey Bridge and Malvern Hill and were repulsed by artillery fire and by the Federal gunboats Galena and Aroostook on the James.

By 4 p.m., Lee ordered Major General John B. Magruder's command first to join Holmes on the River Road and attack Malvern Hill to the south, on the left flank of the Union line, then later ordered him to assist Longstreet at the center; as a result, Magruder's division spent much of the day countermarching.

Major General Thomas Jackson approached slowly from the northeast and spent the entire day north of the White Oak Creek, making only indifferent efforts to cross and attack Franklin's VI Corps in the Battle of White Oak Swamp, then attempting to force the Federals back in a fruitless artillery duel in order that a destroyed bridge could be rebuilt for crossing his army, despite the presence of adequate fords nearby. (In spite of his stunning victories in the recent Valley Campaign, or possibly due to battle fatigue from that campaign, Jackson's contributions in the Seven Days Battles were marred by slow execution and poor judgment throughout.) Jackson's presence did, however, cause Brigadier General John Sedgwick to move two of his three brigades north from the Charles City Road to reinforce the Federal position at the creek.

At the same time, the Union Army near Glendale also faltered in its initial deployment; on the evening of June 29, the Third Division of the V Corps, under command of Brigadier General George A. McCall, was ordered to take up a defensive position ahead of the Glendale intersection to head-off any Confederate thrust made in that direction. Moving slowly after dark on inadequate roads, the brigades of McCall's division became lost and overshot the crossroad, only realizing they had missed their objective sometime in the early morning hours of June 30. Backtracking toward Glendale, the division arrived near dawn, where it halted on its march to rejoin Porter, awaiting new orders. The gap in the Union line created by Sedgwick was noticed and plugged by McCall's three brigades after McCall and his brigadiers soon realized, to their genuine surprise, that nothing stood between them and the advancing divisions of Longstreet and Hill coming from the direction of Richmond.

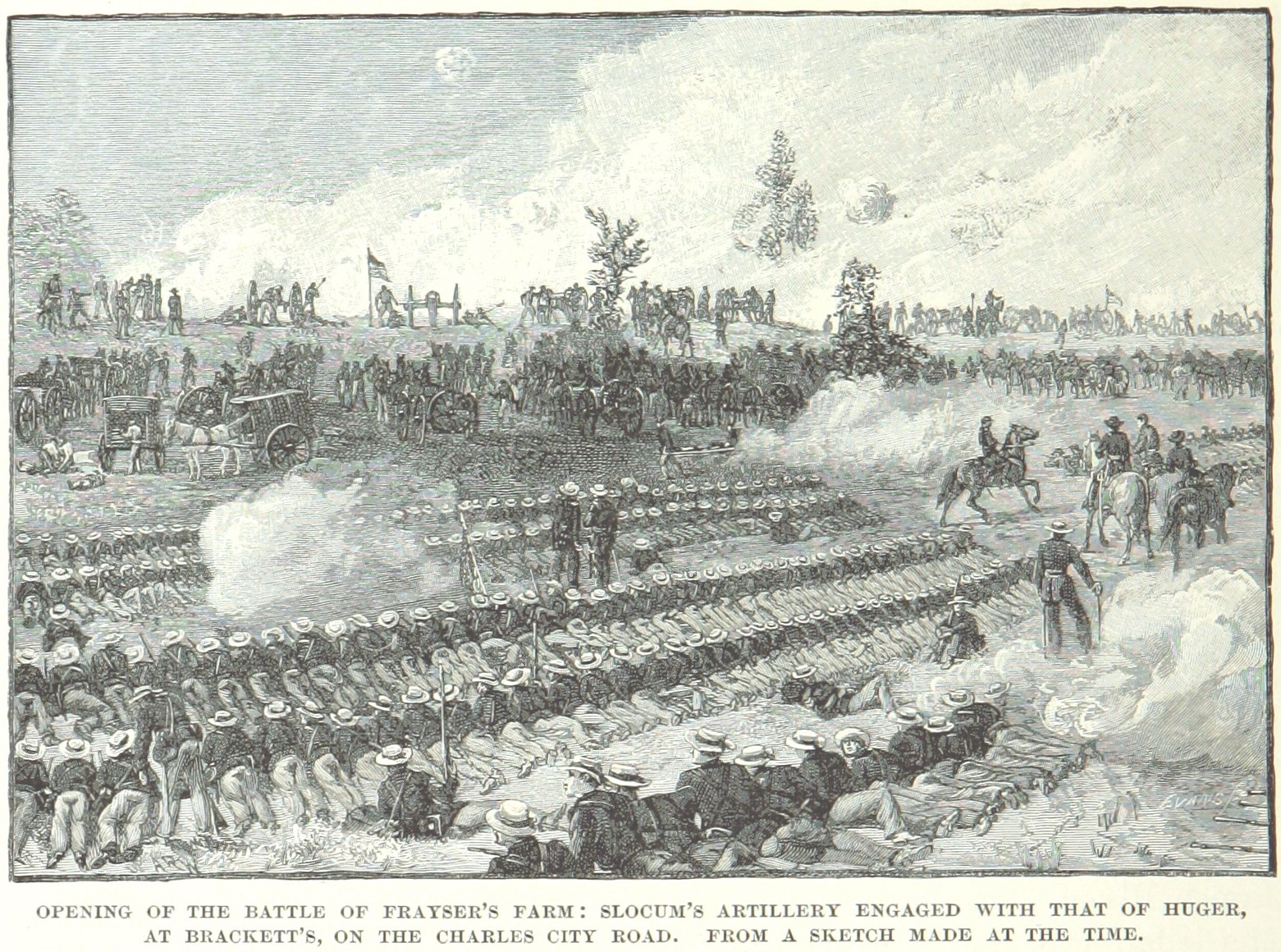
Slocum's artillery engages Huger's (Engraving by Alfred Waud)

At 2 p.m., while Longstreet and A.P. Hill waited for the sounds of Huger's expected opening assault, Longstreet interpreted distant unidentified cannon fire as the signal to begin the coordinated attack. He opened upon McCall's line with his artillery, and McCall's artillery soon returned counter-battery fire. Nearby, Lee, Longstreet, and visiting Confederate President Jefferson Davis were conferring on horseback when they came under heavy artillery fire (presumably blind fire from the Parrott rifles of McCall's Pennsylvania Artillery units), wounding two men and killing three horses. Hill, commanding in that sector, ordered the president and senior generals to the rear. Longstreet ordered Colonel Micah Jenkins to "silence" the Federal battery—an order he would later state he intended to mean the engagement of the cannoneers by sharpshooters, but which instead resulted in the overeager Jenkins ordering his brigade to charge the guns across the open field. This action was soon followed by Longstreet's other brigades mobilizing along the line, which brought about a general fight around 4 p.m.

Although belated and not initiated in the coordinated fashion as Lee planned, the combined assaults by the divisions of A. P. Hill and Longstreet (under Longstreet's overall command) would be the only units to follow Lee's order to attack the main Union concentration. Longstreet's 20,000 men were not joined by the Confederate divisions of Huger or Jackson, despite their concentration within a 3-mile (4.8 km) radius. Longstreet's troops assaulted the disjointed Union line of 40,000 men, arranged in a 2-mile (3.2 km) arc north and south of the Glendale intersection, but the brunt of the fighting centered on the position held by McCall's Pennsylvania Reserves division (Third Division of the V Corps), 6,000 men just west of Frayser's Farm and north of Willis Church. (Though the farm was now owned by R. H. Nelson, many locals still called it Frayser's Farm.) McCall's division consisted of three brigades: Brigadier General George G. Meade's Second Brigade deployed on the right, Brigadier General Truman Seymour's Third Brigade deployed on the left, with the First Brigade of Brigadier General John F. Reynolds (presently commanded by Colonel Seneca G. Simmons following Reynolds's capture at Boatswain's Swamp after Gaines' Mill) held in reserve to the rear of center. Also attached to McCall's division of Pennsylvanian volunteer infantry regiments and two batteries of the 1st Pennsylvania Artillery were three batteries of artillery from the Colonel Henry Hunt's Artillery Reserve of the Army of the Potomac: Captain Otto Diederich's Battery A, 1st Battalion, New York Light Artillery, Captain John Knieriem's Battery C, 1st Battalion, New York Light Artillery, and a Regular Army company, Lieutenant Alanson M. Randol's Battery E & G, 1st U.S. Artillery, replacing Captain Henry De Hart's Battery C, 5th U.S. Artillery, usually attached to the division, which had been overrun and lost three of its guns at Gaines' Mill.

Incidentally, of all the units of the Army of the Potomac present on the Peninsula, McClellan and his corps commanders had tasked the critical defense of this Glendale crossroad to units of the V Corps, the only corps heavily engaged north of the Chickahominy at Gaines' Mill; in particular, to McCall's Pennsylvania Reserves, which had been disproportionately engaged and suffered approximately 2,000 casualties during the fighting at Beaver Dam Creek and Gaines' Mill, consequently entering the fighting at Glendale in a greatly diminished capacity. One historian of the Pennsylvania Reserves wrote of the division at Glendale, "Most of the men were fitter subjects for the hospital than for the battle-field."

Three Confederate brigades were sent forward in the assault, from north to south: Brigadier General Cadmus M. Wilcox, Colonel Micah Jenkins (Anderson's Brigade), and Brigadier General James L. Kemper. Longstreet ordered them forward in a piecemeal fashion over several hours, and they were greatly hindered additionally by the difficulty of the terrain and overgrown forest. The 14th Alabama Infantry was one of the first units to advance and bore the brunt of the Union fire, after which they were "nearly annihilated". The 14th Louisiana also suffered many casualties and would thereafter refer to the battle as "the Slaughterhouse." Kemper's Virginians charged through the thick woods first and emerged in front of five batteries of McCall's artillery. In their first combat experience, Kemper's brigade conducted a disorderly but enthusiastic assault on the Whitlock Farm, which carried them through Seymour's two 1st New York Parrott rifle batteries on McCall's extreme left flank. This sudden disturbance caused McCall to deploy his reserve brigade under Simmons from the center to the left to answer the charge, leaving his right flank weakened and vulnerable. (Colonel Simmons, commanding the countercharge, was mortally wounded while driving Kemper back into the woods) Soon thereafter, the Confederates emerged opposite Meade's brigade and proceeded to break through the main line with Jenkins' support near the right center, followed up within a few hours by Wilcox's brigade of Alabamians in the center and right.

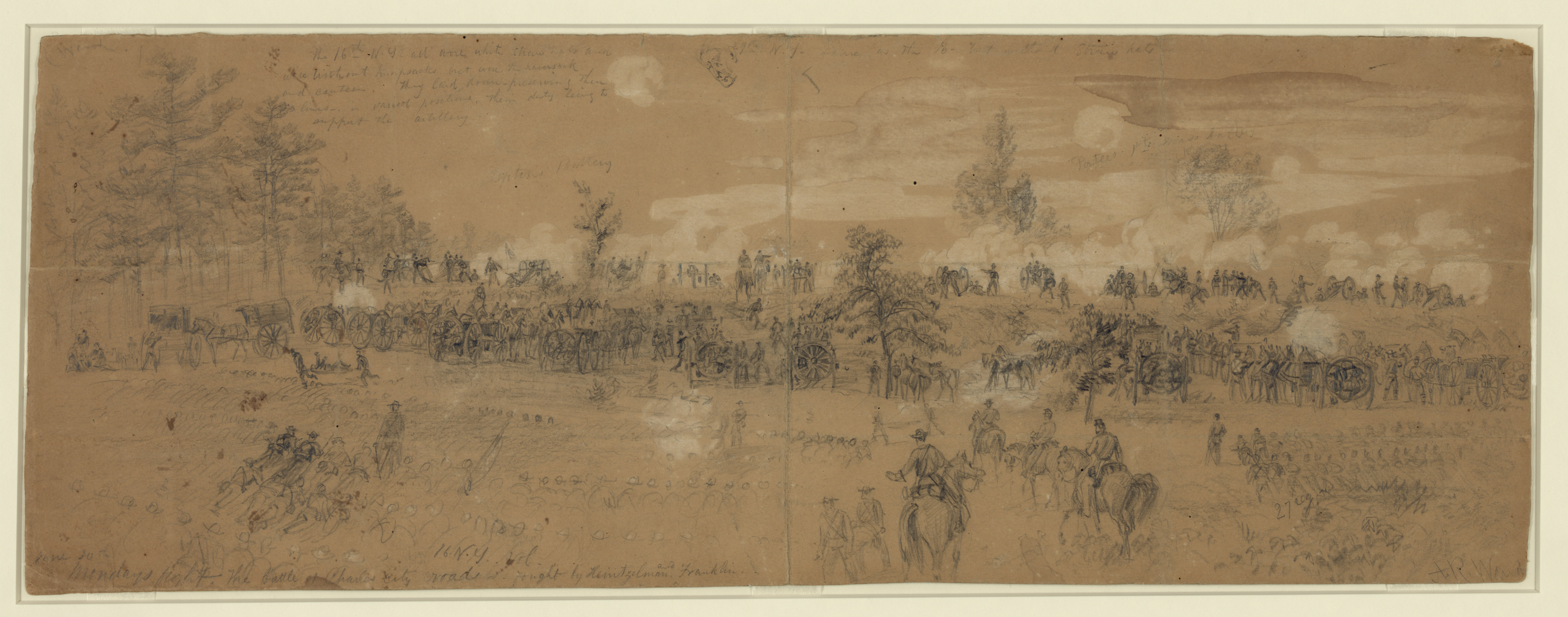
Monday's fight. The battle of Charles City road. Fought by Heintzelman and Franklin. Harper's Weekly, August 9, 1862, by Alfred Waud

During the course of the battle, fighting gradually shifted from McCall's left (Kemper's assault at the Whitlock Farm) through the center (Jenkins' initial probing assault on Captain James H. Cooper and Lieutenant Frank P. Amsden's 1st Pennsylvania Artillery batteries) and to his right (Jenkins'/Wilcox's combined assaults on Meade's brigade where McCall's Division met Kearny's in the New Market Road). The Confederate brigades met stiff resistance from Meade and Seymour in bitter hand-to-hand combat where men stabbed each other with bayonets and used rifles as clubs. Officers even took to using their typically ornamental swords as weapons. Jenkins' brigade briefly captured Captain James H. Cooper's six 10-pounder Parrott rifles but were soon repulsed by the supporting infantrymen of the Pennsylvania Reserves regiments.

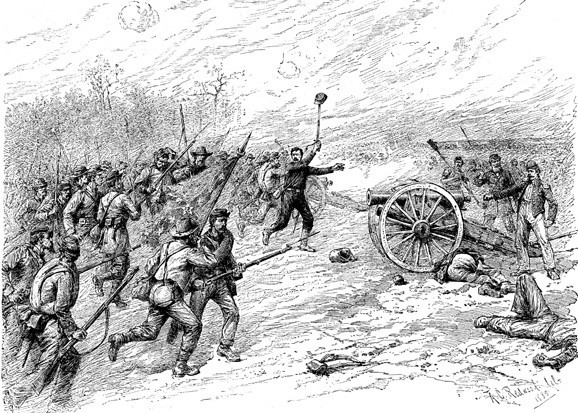
Confederate troops charging Randol's battery, illustration by Allen C. Redwood

Wilcox enjoyed the most successful assault near dusk, when half of his brigade (the 8th and 11th Alabama Infantry Regiments) emerged on McCall's right and found it exposed: to answer the earlier assault against McCall's center, Lieutenant Randol's Battery E & G, 1st U.S. Artillery had changed front to the left, facing his six 12-pounder Napoleon guns southward to rake Jenkins' regiments with devastating enfilading fire but exposing his own right flank to the west in turn. When Wilcox's regiments emerged from the woods, Randol quickly changed fire to the west once more, supported by Captain James Thompson's Battery G, 2nd U.S. Artillery of Kearny's Division to his right, but his supporting infantry units had shifted toward the center and in his front. After successfully repulsing with canister shot the first two Confederate infantry charges made upon the battery, Randol's infantry supports (either the 4th or 7th Pennsylvania Reserves) charged the retreating 8th Alabama to the front of the guns but met an unexpected fresh Confederate regiment coming up, the 11th Alabama; they broke toward the rear and retreated through the battery, leading the 11th Alabama infantry right into the guns before they could fire in defense. Intense hand-to-hand fighting resulted around Randol's guns, observed by McCall and described by him as "one of the fiercest bayonet fights that perhaps ever occurred on this continent". Meade was severely wounded in the arm and back during the fighting while attempting to rally his men, and Colonel Elisha B. Harvey of the 7th Pennsylvania Reserve Regiment was gravely wounded when he was run down by a runaway caisson. Wilcox's regiments were driven off, but soon returned supported by the brigades of Brigadier Generals Roger A. Pryor and Lawrence Branch before Randol's cannoneers could remove their six artillery pieces from the field.

McCall was captured when he mistakenly rode into the Confederate picket line after nightfall, looking for positions to place his rallied men. Seymour assumed command of the division, though he was also wounded. Generals Sumner and Heintzelman were both hit by stray bullets in the fighting; the former suffered no serious injury, but the latter was unable to use his right hand for a few weeks. Captain George W. Hazzard, commanding Battery A, 4th U.S. Artillery, was also mortally wounded.

On McCall's northern flank, the division of Brigadier General Philip Kearny held against repeated Confederate attacks with reinforcements of Caldwell's brigade and two brigades from Slocum's division. On the southern flank, Brigadier General Joseph Hooker's division repelled and once pursued minor attacks. Sedgwick's division, whose brigades had returned from near White Oak Swamp, came up to fill a gap after a brutal counterattack. Heavy fighting continued until about 8:30 p.m. Longstreet committed virtually every brigade in the divisions under his command, while on the Union side they had been fed in individually to plug holes in the line as they occurred.

== Aftermath ==
While the battle was tactically inconclusive, it was strategically a Federal victory: Lee failed to achieve his objective of preventing the Federal escape and crippling or destroying McClellan's army; conversely, in spite of heavy casualties, the Federal defenders withstood the Confederate assaults, allowing the bulk of the Army of the Potomac to pass safely through and successfully entrench at Malvern Hill.

Longstreet's performance had been poor, sending in brigade after brigade in a piecemeal fashion, rather than striking with concentrated force in the manner for which he would be known later in the war. He also was not supported by Huger and Jackson, as Lee had planned. Instead of attacking, both generals merely kept their divisions on the north side of White Oak Swamp and launched no action other than an occasional artillery exchange. Union casualties were 3,797 (297 killed, 1,696 wounded, and 1,804 missing or captured). Confederate casualties were comparable in total—3,673 (638 killed, 2,814 wounded, and 221 missing)—but more than 40% higher in killed and wounded. Longstreet lost more than a quarter of his division. Union Generals Meade, Heintzelman, Sumner and Confederate Generals Joseph R. Anderson, Dorsey Pender, and Winfield S. Featherston were wounded.

On the evening of June 30, McClellan, who had witnessed none of the fighting, wired the War Department: "My Army has behaved superbly and have done all that men could do. If none of us escape we shall at least have done honor to the country. I shall do my best to save the Army." He later requested 50,000 reinforcements (which the War Department had no chance of providing). "With them, I will retrieve our fortunes." McClellan has received significant criticism from historians about his detachment from the battle, sailing on the Galena out of touch while his men fought.

Ethan Rafuse wrote that after McClellan supervised the deployment of three corps near the Glendale crossroads, what he did next "almost defies belief. ... Even though his men were at the time engaged in a fierce battle near Glendale ... he spent the afternoon on board the Galena, dining with [Captain] Rodgers and traveling briefly up river to watch the gunboat shelling of a Confederate division that had been spotted marching east along the River road toward Malvern Hill."

Brian K. Burton wrote, "more than on any other day, McClellan's judgment on [June 30, 1862] is suspect. He had arranged for signal communications between Malvern Hill and the river but that is a poor substitute. To leave units from five different corps at a vital point with no overall commander is to court disaster."

Stephen W. Sears wrote that, when McClellan deserted his army on the Glendale and Malvern Hill battlefields during the Seven Days, "he was guilty of dereliction of duty."

After the battle, Lee wrote, "Could the other commands have cooperated in this action, the result would have proved most disastrous to the enemy."

Confederate Major General D.H. Hill was even more direct: "Had all our troops been at Frayser's Farm, there would have been no Malvern Hill."

After the war, Confederate Brigadier General Edward Porter Alexander (present at Glendale) wrote, "Never, before or after, did the fates put such a prize within our reach. It is my individual belief that on two occasions in the four years, we were within reach of military successes so great that we might have hoped to end the war with our independence. ... The first was at Bull Run [in] July 1861 ... This [second] chance of June 30, 1862 impresses me as the best of all."

Lee would have only one more opportunity to intercept McClellan's army before it reached the safety of the river and the end of the Seven Days, at the Battle of Malvern Hill on July 1.

Part of the battle took place on Gravel Hill, a community established for slaves freed by Quaker Robert Pleasants before 1800. Although what had once been the historic Gravel Hill School had been destroyed, it was replaced by Gravel Hill Baptist Church in 1866, and the community remains close-knit today.

== Battlefield preservation ==
The American Battlefield Trust and its partners have acquired and preserved 726 acres (2.94 km^{2}) of the battlefield in more than 15 separate acquisitions from 1995 through November 2021.

== See also ==
- Troop engagements of the American Civil War, 1862
- List of costliest American Civil War land battles
- Richmond in the Civil War
- Virginia in the American Civil War
- List of American Civil War battles
- List of Virginia Civil War units
