= V Corps (Union army) =

- V Corps badge
- Active: 1862–1865
- Country: United States of America
- Branch: Union Army
- Part of: Army of the Potomac
- Engagements: Peninsula Campaign; Second Battle of Bull Run; Battle of Antietam; Battle of Fredericksburg; Battle of Gettysburg; Battle of Bristoe Station; Battle of the Wilderness; Battle of Spotsylvania Courthouse; Battle of Cold Harbor; Siege of Petersburg; Battle of Five Forks

Commanders
- Notable commanders: Fitz John Porter; George G. Meade; George Sykes; Gouverneur K. Warren; Charles Griffin

Insignia
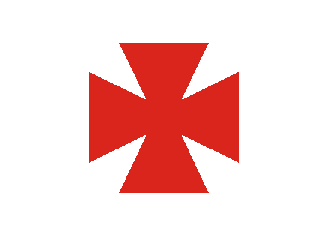
- 1st Division

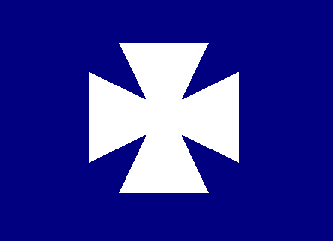
- 2nd Division

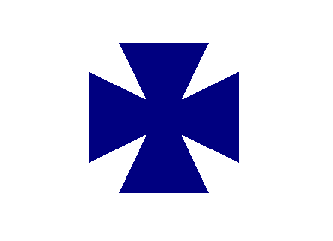
- 3rd Division

The V Corps (Fifth Corps) was a unit of the Union Army of the Potomac during the American Civil War.

== 1862 ==
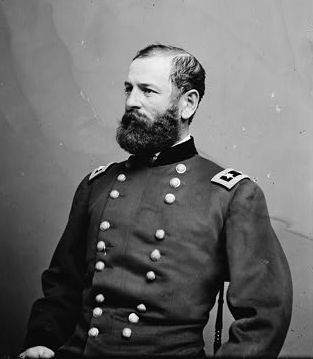
Maj. Gen. Fitz J. Porter

The first unit designated as the V corps was organized briefly under Nathaniel P. Banks (Banks's original command opposed Stonewall Jackson's Valley Campaign and ultimately became XII Corps.)

The unit better known as V Corps was formed within the Army of the Potomac on May 18, 1862 as V Corps Provisional, which was engaged in the Peninsula Campaign to seize Richmond. It was created by merging Maj. Gen. Fitz John Porter's 3rd Division of the III Corps with Maj. Gen. George Sykes' division of U.S. Regular troops, formerly in the Reserve.

Porter became corps commander and his 1st Division was assigned to Brig. Gen. George W. Morell. On July 22, 1862, "provisional" was dropped from the name as the U.S. War Department confirmed it as the V Corps, Army of the Potomac.

The V Corps fought in several battles throughout the Peninsula Campaign, including Hanover Court House, Mechanicsville, Gaines's Mill, Glendale, and Malvern Hill. The corps' losses in the Seven Days Battles were 995 killed, 3,805 wounded, and 2,801 captured or missing, totaling 7,601, or half the entire loss of the army. Of these casualties, 6,837 occurred at Gaines's Mill; the remainder at Mechanicsville, Glendale, and Malvern Hill. The corps was temporarily enlarged on June 14 by George A. McCall's division of Pennsylvania Reserves, which included future stars John F. Reynolds and George G. Meade. The corps fought stoutly at Gaines' Mill in particular, where Porter commanded the Union forces that included only the V Corps and Henry W. Slocum's 1st Division of the VI Corps against nearly the entire Confederate Army of Northern Virginia. After the Peninsula Campaign, the Pennsylvania Reserves returned to McDowell's corps.

George McClellan held a special admiration for the V Corps, especially as Fitz-John Porter was a close personal friend of his, and he often touted it as a model outfit the rest of the army should imitate. The general officers in the corps were all West Pointers and contained no political appointees or nonprofessionals. The presence of regular army troops added a more professional air to the V Corps than the others, and discipline and drills were typically stricter. In addition, the army artillery reserve was attached to the corps.

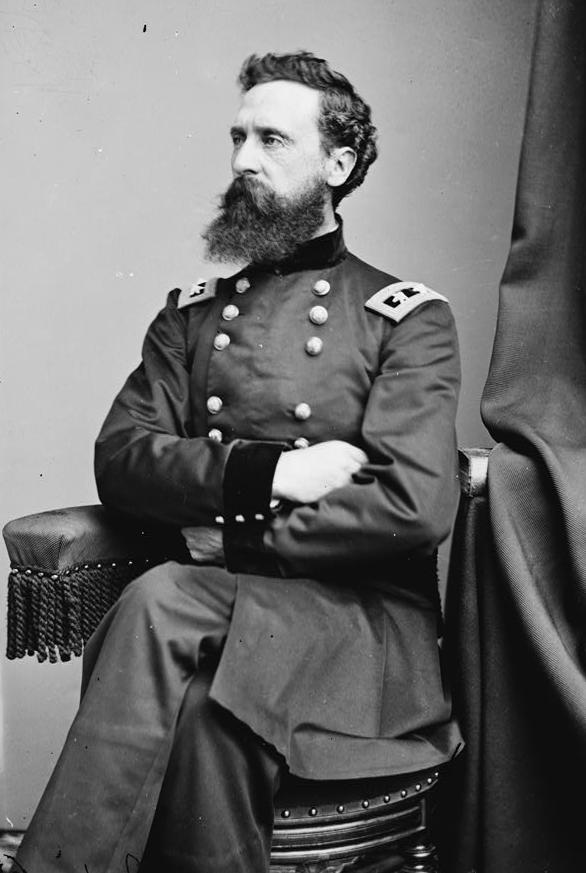
Maj. Gen. George Sykes

The V Corps saw action at the Second Battle of Bull Run, fighting on the left wing of the Union army. Losses of the small corps were 331 killed, 1,364 wounded, and 456 missing; a total of 2,151, out of about 6,500 engaged. Two of the corp's six brigades were not engaged and George Morell was temporarily detached, his division being commanded by Brig. Gen Daniel Butterfield. One brigade, composed of two regiments under Gouverneur K. Warren, made a futile stand against the Confederate attack on the Union left flank.

The corps was lightly engaged at Antietam. Morell's division saw no action at all, while some of the regular division participated in the fighting and were employed to plug various holes in the army's line during the battle. A new division of nine month regiments had been attached, led by Brig. Gen Andrew A. Humphreys but it did not arrive until after the battle was over.

After Antietam, Fitz-John Porter was court martialed for disobeying orders at Second Bull Run. Although Porter himself was not to blame, John Pope chose him as a scapegoat for that loss and his career was summarily ruined. 1st Division commander George Morell also lost his post because he testified on Porter's behalf at the court martial hearings (the War Department for a long time after the Porter trial was reluctant to promote officers in the V Corps)

In the Army of the Potomac's restructuring under newly appointed Maj. Gen. Ambrose E. Burnside, the V Corps was placed with the III Corps in the Center "Grand Division" under the command of Joseph Hooker. Maj. Gen. Daniel Butterfield replaced Porter to command the V Corps at the Battle of Fredericksburg, and Generals Charles Griffin, Sykes, and Humphreys the three divisions. Griffin and Humphreys participated in the disastrous assaults on Marye's Heights, Sykes' regulars moved up after darkness and spent the night on the field. The Regulars were significantly engaged during the day of the 14th, with fighting around the Tannery on the northern end of the line. Losses were 206 killed, 1,669 wounded, and 300 missing; total, 2,175.

== 1863 ==
When Hooker took command of the Army of the Potomac in the spring, he did away with the "grand divisions" and made Butterfield his chief of staff. Maj. Gen. George G. Meade, formerly commanding the 3rd Division of the I Corps, took charge of the V Corps. It was at this time that each corps was designated a symbol; the V Corps used a cross pattée, the straight-edged variant of the Maltese Cross.

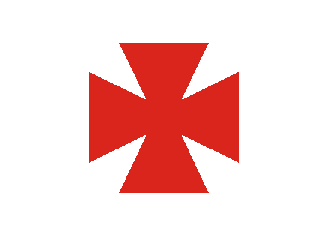
Union Army 1st Division Badge, V Corps

The V Corps was not significantly engaged at Chancellorsville, but soon after the entire 3rd Division had their enlistments expire and went home. Another division under Brig. Gen. Samuel W. Crawford, made up of two Pennsylvania Reserve brigades, promptly joined while Robert E. Lee's Army of Northern Virginia invaded the North.

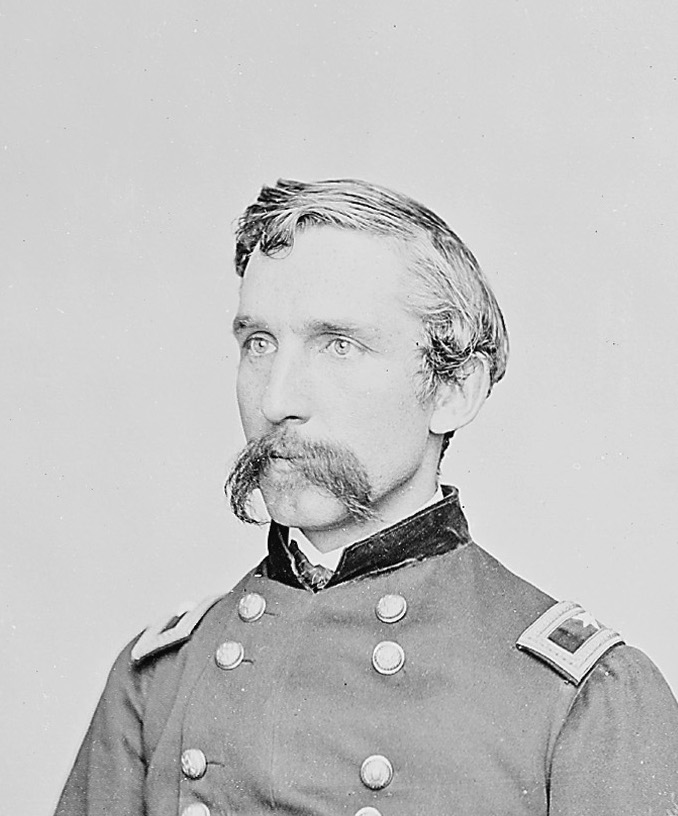
Col. Joshua L. Chamberlain

George Sykes took command of the V Corps on June 28, 1863, as George Meade was promoted to command of the Army of the Potomac. The corps arrived at the eastern end of the Gettysburg battlefield on July 2. They earned distinction from fighting in the wheat field but were most famous for the actions of Colonel Strong Vincent's 3rd Brigade, 1st Division. The brigade quickly marched to cover Little Round Top, a nearly bare hill at the left end of the Union line. Against ferocious attacks from the Confederate First Corps of James Longstreet, Vincent's brigade held the hill and saved the Union army from being flanked. The scene is depicted in the novel The Killer Angels (1974) by Michael Shaara and the movie Gettysburg (1993), based on the novel, focusing on the 20th Maine regiment at the extreme left, under the command of Colonel Joshua Lawrence Chamberlain. The 1st Division under James Barnes and the Regular Division (mainly US Army infantry) under Romeyn Ayres both suffered severe losses in the battle (casualties among the regulars numbered nearly 50%). Charles Griffin was ill during the campaign and returned to command his division after the campaign. By contrast, the Pennsylvania Reserves under Crawford were relatively lightly engaged.

The V Corps saw the deaths of two of their generals at Gettysburg: Brig. Gens. Stephen H. Weed and Strong Vincent (who was quickly promoted not long before his death for his heroic efforts on Little Round Top). The Corps saw little action in the autumn campaigns of 1863. At the Battle of Bristoe Station (October 14, 1863) V Corps was fired on by troops of A. P. Hill. This distracted Hill from the arrival of II Corps. This allowed Gouverneur K. Warren, commanding V Corps, to seize a favorable position and inflict a defeat on Hill's corps.

== 1864 ==
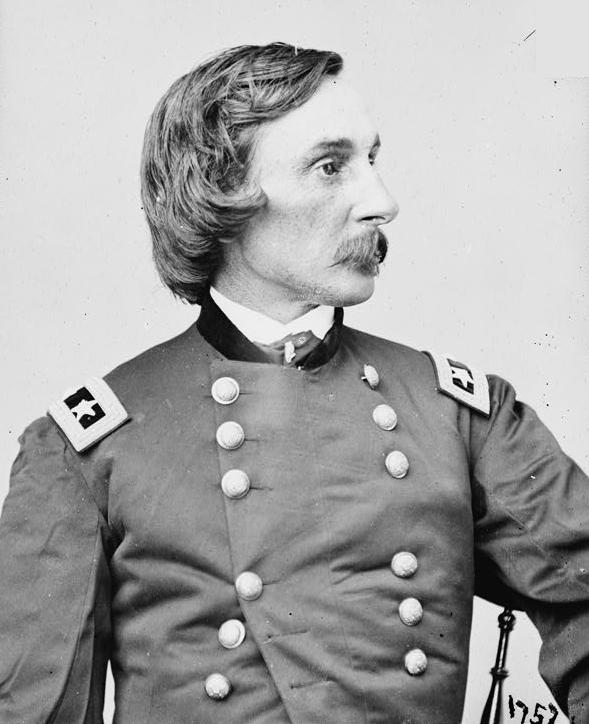
Maj. Gen. Gouverneur K. Warren

In March 1864, with Lieutenant General Ulysses S. Grant now in command of all Union armies, the V Corps was restructured, along with the entire army. The 1st and 2nd Divisions were consolidated into one 1st Division, under General Griffin. Crawford's 3rd Division of Pennsylvanians remained unchanged, although it was due to be mustered out of the service in a few weeks. The I Corps was merged into the V as the 2nd and 4th Divisions, under Generals John C. Robinson and James S. Wadsworth respectively. George Sykes was removed from command, after the corps' medical director has diagnosed him with a severe case of sciatica. Replacing him was Gouverneur Warren, who had been the army's chief engineer at Gettysburg.

By the time of the Battle of the Wilderness, the corps included over 25,000 men; following the end of the Battle of Spotsylvania Court House in May 1864, over 10,000 had become casualties. General Wadsworth was killed at the Wilderness, and Robinson was severely wounded (losing a leg) at Spotsylvania. His division was broken down and dispersed temporarily among the others of the V Corps. Wadsworth's Division went under General Lysander Cutler, commander of the Iron Brigade.

The V Corps saw hard fighting at Cold Harbor and the Siege of Petersburg in June. Many of its men were captured in the Second Battle of Weldon Railroad on August 19, 1864. Cutler's division was broken up after these battles. At that point the three remaining divisions were commanded by generals Griffin, Ayres, and Crawford; they would remain until the end of the war. Griffin's division eventually contained most of the remaining regiments of the old V Corps, plus newly organized units. Ayres had new regiments and a few veteran units, including a brigade of Maryland troops. The Regular Division he'd commanded no longer existed as it had been disbanded due to its severe casualties. The remainder of the old I Corps served under Crawford. These divisions participated in the Battle of Peebles' Farm (September 30, 1864).

== 1865 ==
By March 31, 1865, the V Corps was down to 17,000 men and would lose 2,000 more by the time Lee surrendered at Appomattox Court House. After the Battle of Five Forks, with the war's end literally days away, General Warren was relieved of command by Maj. Gen. Philip Sheridan, displeased by his supposed lack of aggressive pursuit of the enemy (Warren spent the remainder of his life seeking rehabilitation of his reputation). Warren was replaced by Griffin, who led the corps in the pursuit of Lee's army. It arrived at Appomattox Courthouse in time to support Sheridan's cavalry against any attempted breakout by the Confederate forces. The corps was officially disbanded on June 28, 1865.

== Command history ==
Fitz John Porter	May 18, 1862 – November 10, 1862
Joseph Hooker	November 10, 1862 – November 16, 1862
Daniel Butterfield	November 16, 1862 – December 25, 1862
George G. Meade	December 25, 1862 – January 26, 1863
Charles Griffin	January 26, 1863 – February 1, 1863
George Sykes	February 1, 1863 – February 5, 1863
George G. Meade	February 5, 1863 – February 16, 1863
Andrew A. Humphreys	February 23, 1863 – February 28, 1863
George G. Meade	February 28, 1863 – June 28, 1863
George Sykes	June 28, 1863 – October 7, 1863
Samuel W. Crawford	October 7, 1863 – October 15, 1863
George Sykes	October 15, 1863 – March 23, 1864
Gouverneur K. Warren	March 23, 1864 – January 2, 1865
Samuel W. Crawford	January 2, 1865 – January 27, 1865
Gouverneur K. Warren	January 27, 1865 – April 1, 1865
Charles Griffin	April 1, 1865 – June 28, 1865
