= Battle of Ball's Bluff order of battle: Union =

The following Union Army units and commanders fought in the Battle of Ball's Bluff of the American Civil War, fought from October 20 to October 24, 1861, in Loudoun County, Virginia, also known as the Battle of Leesburg or the Battle of Harrison's Island. The Confederate order of battle is shown separately.

== Abbreviations used ==
=== Military rank ===
- MG = Major General
- BG = Brigadier General
- Col = Colonel
- Ltc = Lieutenant Colonel
- Maj = Major
- Cpt = Captain
- Lt = Lieutenant
- Bvt = Brevet Rank

=== Other ===
- w = wounded
- mw = mortally wounded
- k = killed

== Union Forces Around Ball's Bluff and Edwards' Ferry ==
=== Army of the Potomac ===
MG George B. McClellan (not present)

==== Corps of Observation ====
BG Charles Pomeroy Stone

Division	Brigade	Regiments and Others
Stones' Division (Corps of Observation); BG Charles Pomeroy Stone	First Brigade BG Frederick W. Lander	1st Company Massachusetts Sharpshooters: Cpt John Saunders; 7th Michigan Infantry: Col Ira Grosvenor; 19th Massachusetts Infantry: Col Edward Hinks; 20th Massachusetts Infantry: Col William Raymond Lee (c)
Stones' Division (Corps of Observation); BG Charles Pomeroy Stone	Second Brigade BG Willis A. Gorman	1st Minnesota Infantry: Col Napoleon J.T. Dana; 2nd New York State Militia: Col George W.B. Tompkins; 34th New York Infantry: Col William LeDew
Stones' Division (Corps of Observation); BG Charles Pomeroy Stone	Third Brigade Col Edward D. Baker (k)	1st California Infantry: Ltc Isaac J. Wistar (w); 2nd California Infantry: Col Joshua T. Owen; 3rd California Infantry: Col DeWitt C. Baxter; 5th California Infantry: Col Turner G. Morehead
Stones' Division (Corps of Observation); BG Charles Pomeroy Stone	Unassigned Regiments	15th Massachusetts Infantry: Col Charles Devens (w); 42nd New York Infantry (Tammany Jackson Guard): Col Milton Cogswell (w&c)
Stones' Division (Corps of Observation); BG Charles Pomeroy Stone	Cavalry	3rd New York Cavalry Regiment (B, D, E, and I companies): Col James Henry Van Alen; Putnam Rangers, D.C. Volunteer Cavalry: Cpt George Thistleton
Stones' Division (Corps of Observation); BG Charles Pomeroy Stone	Artillery	1st U.S. Artillery, Battery I: Lt George A. Woodruff; 1st Rhode Island Light Artillery, Battery B: Cpt Thomas F. Vaughn; 2nd New York State Militia Artillery Detachment; 6th New York Independent Battery: Cpt Thomas B. Bunting
