= James Van Alen =

James Van Alen may refer to:

- James Henry Van Alen (1819–1886), American Civil War brigadier general
- James I. Van Alen (1772–1822), American politician
- James J. Van Alen (1848–1923), American sportsman and politician
- Jimmy Van Alen (1902–1991), American tennis player

== See also ==
- James Van Allen (1914–2006), American space scientist
