= Battle of Ball's Bluff order of battle =

The order of battle for the Battle of Ball's Bluff (also known as Battle of Leesburg or Battle of Harrison's Island) includes:

- Battle of Ball's Bluff order of battle: Confederate
- Battle of Ball's Bluff order of battle: Union
