= 12th New York Infantry Regiment =

12th New York Volunteer Infantry Regiment
- Active: May 8, 1861 to June 2, 1864
- Country: United States
- Allegiance: Union
- Branch: Infantry
- Size: 778, (Note: As reported back to Adjutant General Hillhouse upon departure from New York on June 27, 1861) 720 (Note: As reported back to Adjutant General Hillhouse, on December 31, 1862), 772 (Note: As reported back to Adjutant General Sprague, on December 31, 1863)
- Nicknames: Onondaga Regiment, Independence Guard
- Equipment: Model 1842 Springfield Muskets (.69 caliber, smoothbore and rifled) (Note: On 18 Sep 1861, 846 Harper's Ferry rifled Model 1842s, percussion locks from manufacture and rifled. As reported back to Adjutant General on December 31, 1863. This was the number turned in when issued Springfields.), 1861, Model 1861 Springfield Rifles
- Engagements: Battle of Blackburn's Ford; First Battle of Bull Run; Battle of Upton's Hill; Siege of Yorktown; Battle of Hanover Court House; Seven Days Battles; Battle of Gaines's Mill; Battle of Malvern Hill; Second Battle of Bull Run; Battle of Antietam; Battle of Shepherdstown; Battle of Fredericksburg; Battle of Chancellorsville; Battle of Gettysburg; Bristoe Campaign; Mine Run Campaign; Battle of the Wilderness; Battle of Spotsylvania Court House; Battle of North Anna; Battle of Totopotomoy Creek

Insignia
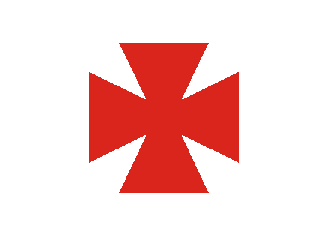
- 1st Division, V Corps

The 12th New York Infantry Regiment was an infantry regiment in the Union Army during the American Civil War.

== Service ==
=== 3 Month Service of the 12th New York State Militia ===
The 12th New York Volunteer Infantry is sometimes confused with the 12th New York State Militia, a distinguished regiment formed in 1847 and which left New York City on April 21, 1861, for three months' service under the command of Colonel Daniel Butterfield.

The 12th New York State Militia was not the same regiment as the 12th New York volunteers, though in February 1862 it did furnish a five-company battalion for the 12th Volunteers, and Henry A. Weeks of the militia regiment took command of the 12th Volunteers as a result. Remaining 12th New York militiamen stayed in New York City with their regiment, which was activated for federal service twice more during the war. Compounding the 12th Volunteers/12th Militia confusion is the fact that Butterfield at one point commanded the brigade in which the 12th New York Volunteers served. Also, as indicated by inscriptions on the 12th New York's monument at Gettysburg, at least some of its veterans considered the two 12th New York regiments to be one and the same.

=== 2 Year ===
The 12th New York Volunteer Infantry was organized at Elmira, New York and mustered on May 8, 1861, for two years' state service under the command of Colonel Ezra L. Walrath. On May 13, 1861, the regiment was re-mustered for three months' federal service and again re-mustered on August 2, 1861, for two years' state service.

The regiment was attached to Richardson's Brigade, Tyler's Division, McDowell's Army of Northeast Virginia, June to August 1861. Richardson's Brigade, Division of the Potomac, to October 1861. Wadsworth's Brigade, McDowell's Division, Army of the Potomac, to March 1862. Butterfield's 3rd Brigade, Porter's 1st Division, III Corps, Army of the Potomac, to May 1862. 3rd Brigade, 1st Division, V Corps, to May 1863. Headquarters, V Corps, to June 1864.

The 12th New York Infantry mustered out of the service on May 17, 1863. Men who had enlisted for three years' service were consolidated into two companies and served duty as Provost Guard for Headquarters of V Corps under the command of Captain Henry W. Ryder. These two companies ceased to exist on June 2, 1864, when their members were transferred to the 5th New York Infantry as Companies E and F. Although transferred to the 5th, the two former 12th New York companies remained on duty at corps headquarters.

== Affiliations, battle honors, detailed service, and casualties ==
=== Organizational affiliation ===
Attached to:

- Col. Richardson's Brigade, Brig. Gen. Tyler's Division, Brig. Gen. McDowell's Army of Northeast Virginia, June to August, 1861
- Richardson's Brigade, Division of the Potomac, to October, 1861
- Brig. Gen. Wadsworth's Brigade, McDowell's Division, Army of the Potomac (AoP), to March, 1862
- Brig. Gen. Butterfield's 3rd Brigade, Brig. Gen. Porter's 1st Division, III Corps, AoP, to May, 1862
- 3rd Brigade, 1st Division, V Corps, AoP, to May, 1863
- Headquarters, V Corps, AoP, to June, 1864.

=== List of battles ===
The official list of battles in which the regiment bore a part:

- Battle of Blackburn's Ford
- First Battle of Bull Run
- Battle of Upton's Hill
- Siege of Yorktown
- Battle of Hanover Court House
- Seven Days Battles
- Battle of Gaines's Mill
- Battle of Malvern Hill
- Second Battle of Bull Run
- Battle of Antietam
- Battle of Shepherdstown
- Battle of Fredericksburg
- Battle of Chancellorsville
- Battle of Gettysburg
- Bristoe Campaign
- Mine Run Campaign
- Battle of the Wilderness
- Battle of Spotsylvania Court House
- Battle of North Anna
- Battle of Totopotomoy Creek

=== Detailed service ===
Detailed description as follows:

==== 1861 ====
- Left State for Washington, D.C., May 29
- Duty in the defenses of Washington, D.C., until July 16, 1861
- Advance on Manassas, Va., July 16–21
- First Battle of Bull Run July 21
- Upton's Hill August 27
- Duty in the defenses of Washington, D.C. until March 10, 1862

==== 1862 ====
- Advance on Manassas, Va., March 10
- Moved to the Virginia Peninsula March 22–24
- Warwick Road April 5
- Siege of Yorktown April 5-May 4
- Before Yorktown April 11
- Reconnaissance up the Pamunkey May 10
- Reconnaissance to Hanover Court House May 26
- Battle of Hanover Court House May 27
- Operations about Hanover Court House May 27–29
- Seven Days before Richmond June 25-July 1
- Battle of Gaines's Mill July 27
- White Oak Swamp and Turkey Bend June 30
- Malvern Hill July 1
- Duty at Harrison's Landing until August 16
- Movement to Fort Monroe, then to Centreville August 16–28
- Pope's Campaign in northern Virginia August 28-September 2
- Second Battle of Bull Run August 30
- Maryland Campaign September 6–22
- Battle of Antietam September 16–17
- Shepherdstown September 19
- At Sharpsburg, Md., until October 30
- Movement to Falmouth, Va., October 30-November 19
- Battle of Fredericksburg December 12–15
- Expedition to Richard's and Ellis' Fords December 29–30

==== 1863 ====
- "Mud March" January 20–24, 1863
- At Falmouth until April
- Chancellorsville Campaign April 27-May 6
- Battle of Chancellorsville May 1–5
- Participated in the Gettysburg Campaign June 11-July 24, 1863
- Battle of Gettysburg July 1–3
- Bristoe Campaign October 9–22
- Advance to line of the Rappahannock November 7–8
- Mine Run Campaign November 26-December 2

==== 1864 ====
- Campaign from the Rapidan to the James May 3-June 2
- Battle of the Wilderness May 5–7
- Spotsylvania May 8–12
- Spotsylvania Court House May 12–21
- North Anna River May 23–26
- On line of the Pamunkey May 26–28
- Totopotomoy May 28–31.

=== Casualties ===
The regiment lost a total of 124 men during service; 3 officers and 61 enlisted men killed or mortally wounded, 1 officer and 59 enlisted men died of disease.

== Armament ==
Soldiers in the 12th were armed with 778 National Armory (NA) (Note: In government records, National Armory refers to one of three United States Armory and Arsenals, the Springfield Armory, the Harpers Ferry Armory, and the Rock Island Arsenal. Rifle-muskets, muskets, and rifles were manufactured in Springfield and Harper's Ferry before the war. When the Rebels destroyed the Harpers Ferry Armory early in the American Civil War and stole the machinery for the Confederate central government-run Richmond Armory, the Springfield Armory was briefly the only government manufacturer of arms, until the Rock Island Arsenal was established in 1862. During this time production ramped up to unprecedented levels ever seen in American manufacturing up until that time, with only 9,601 rifles manufactured in 1860, rising to a peak of 276,200 by 1864. These advancements would not only give the Union a decisive technological advantage over the Confederacy during the war but served as a precursor to the mass production manufacturing that contributed to the post-war Second Industrial Revolution and 20th century machine manufacturing capabilities. American historian Merritt Roe Smith has drawn comparisons between the early assembly machining of the Springfield rifles and the later production of the Ford Model T, with the latter having considerably more parts, but producing a similar numbers of units in the earliest years of the 1913–1915 automobile assembly line, indirectly due to mass production manufacturing advancements pioneered by the armory 50 years earlier.) and contract manufactured Model 1842 Springfield Muskets smoothbore muskets drawn from state arsenals. (Note: The smoothbore version was produced without sights (except for a cast one on the barrel band). Using a Buck and Ball cartridge, the smoothbore version of the 1842 musket was very effective during the American Civil War.) At some point in the fall of 1861, the regiment, like others in its division, exchanged the smoothbore muskets for newer Model 1861 Springfield rifled muskets at the Washington DC arsenal. By the end of the first full year of hard campaigning, the regimented returned 720 Model 1842 smoothbore percussion muskets to the Adjutant General. By theFredericksburg, the regiment reported the following survey result to U.S. War Department: (Note: Interestingly, G Company, the largest, still had the 1842 smoothbores at Fredericksburg.)

- A — 34 Springfield Rifled Muskets, model 1855, 1861, NA and contract, (.58 Cal.)
- B — 35 Springfield Rifled Muskets, model 1855, 1861, NA and contract, (.58 Cal.)
- C — 33 Springfield Rifled Muskets, model 1855, 1861, NA and contract, (.58 Cal.)
- D — 35 Springfield Rifled Muskets, model 1855, 1861, NA and contract, (.58 Cal.)
- E — 41 Springfield Rifled Muskets, model 1855, 1861, NA and contract, (.58 Cal.)
- F — 33 Springfield Rifled Muskets, model 1855, 1861, NA and contract, (.58 Cal.)
- G — 86 Springfield Muskets, model 1842, NA and contract, (.69 Cal.)
- H — 35 Springfield Rifled Muskets, model 1855, 1861, NA and contract, (.58 Cal.)
- I — 37 Springfield Rifled Muskets, model 1855, 1861, NA and contract, (.58 Cal.)
- K — 33 Springfield Rifled Muskets, model 1855, 1861, NA and contract, (.58 Cal.)

At the end of the next quarter, just before the Chancellorsville campaign, the regiment reported the following:

- A — 35 Springfield Rifled Muskets, model 1855, 1861, NA and contract, (.58 Cal.)
- B — 37 Springfield Rifled Muskets, model 1855, 1861, NA and contract, (.58 Cal.)
- C — 33 Springfield Rifled Muskets, model 1855, 1861, NA and contract, (.58 Cal.)
- D — 41 Springfield Rifled Muskets, model 1855, 1861, NA and contract, (.58 Cal.)
- E — 47 Springfield Rifled Muskets, model 1855, 1861, NA and contract, (.58 Cal.)
- F — 38 Springfield Rifled Muskets, model 1855, 1861, NA and contract, (.58 Cal.)
- G — 86 Springfield Muskets, model 1842, NA and contract, (.69 Cal.)
- H — 41 Springfield Rifled Muskets, model 1855, 1861, NA and contract, (.58 Cal.)
- I — 33 Springfield Rifled Muskets, model 1855, 1861, NA and contract, (.58 Cal.)
- K — 54 Springfield Rifled Muskets, model 1855, 1861, NA and contract, (.58 Cal.)

On April 23, D and E Companies on duty at V Corps headquarters reported:

- D — 76 Springfield Rifled Muskets, model 1855, 1861, NA and contract, (.58 Cal.)
- E — 90 Springfield Rifled Muskets, model 1855, 1861, NA and contract, (.58 Cal.)

=== Shoulder Arms Gallery ===
Issued weapons

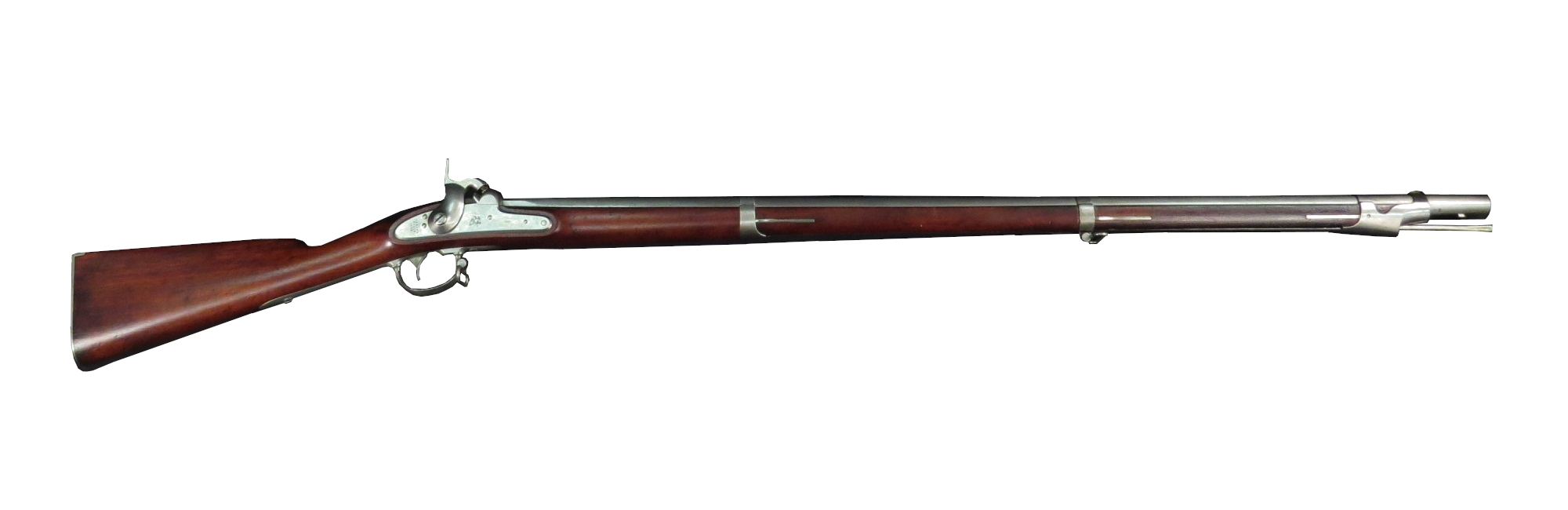
Model 1842 smoothbore musket

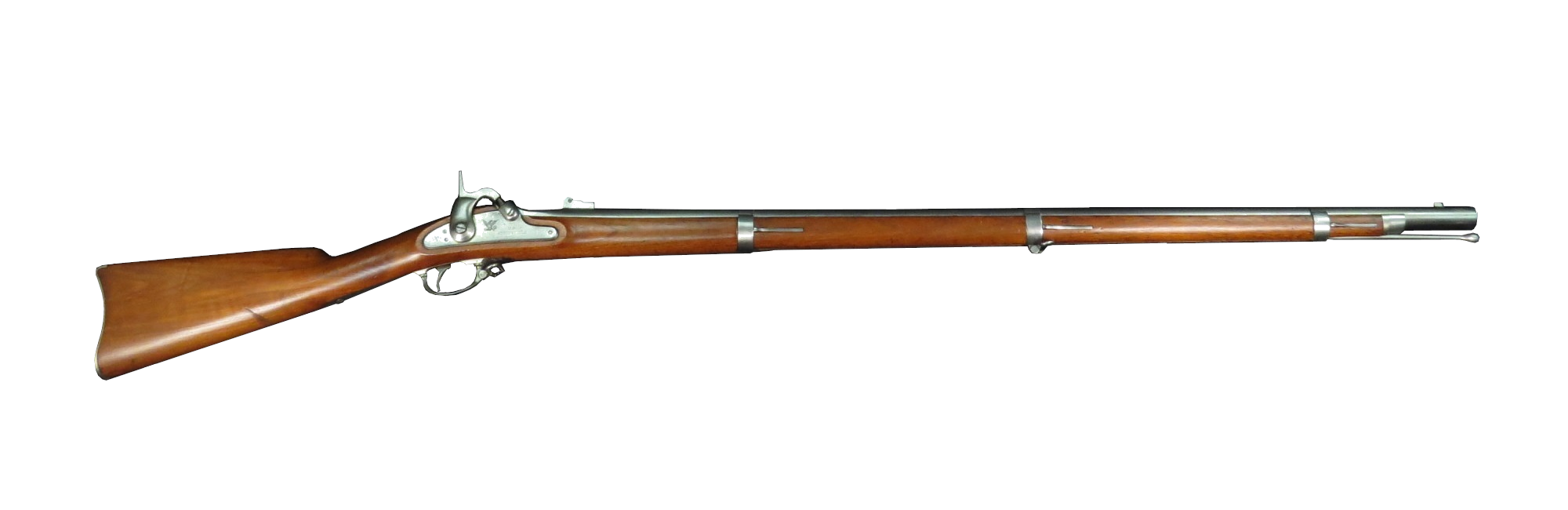
Springfield Model 1861

== Commanders ==
- Colonel Daniel Butterfield - commander of the three-month regiment
- Colonel Ezra L. Walrath - first commander of the two-year regiment
- Colonel George W. Snyder
- Colonel Henry A. Weeks - commanded the 12th New York battalion of three-year volunteers that joined the two-year regiment in the field, and commanded the two-year regiment as a result
- Colonel Benjamin A. Willis
- Major Henry W. Ryder - promoted from captain January 1, 1864

== Notable members ==
- Captain George W. Cole, Company H - major general by brevet after commanding 2nd United States Colored Cavalry Regiment.
- Private Boston Corbett, Company I - later famous for shooting and killing John Wilkes Booth, assassin of Abraham Lincoln, while a Sergeant in the 16th New York Cavalry Regiment
- Corporal James E. Cross, Company K - Medal of Honor recipient for action at the Battle of Blackburn's Ford
- Surgeon Henry Draper, Company S from May 31 to October 8, 1862
- Assistant Surgeon John Christopher Draper, Company S from May 31 to October 8, 1862
- Private Charles F. Rand, Company K - Medal of Honor recipient for action at the Battle of Blackburn's Ford
- George Truesdell

== See also ==
- List of New York Civil War regiments
- New York in the Civil War
