= William Wallace Burns =

American politician

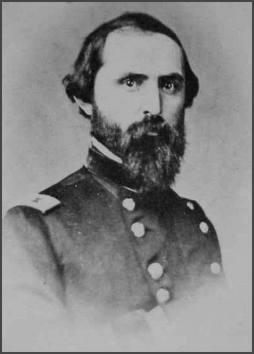
- William Wallace Burns
- Born: September 3, 1825; Coshocton, Ohio
- Died: April 19, 1892 (aged 66); Beaufort, South Carolina
- Burial place: Arlington National Cemetery
- Military career
- Allegiance: United States of America; Union
- Branch: United States Army; Union Army
- Service years: 1847–1889
- Rank: Brigadier general
- Commands: Philadelphia Brigade
- Conflicts: Mexican–American War; Third Seminole War: American Civil War; Battle of Fair Oaks; Battle of Savage's Station; Battle of Glendale; Battle of Fredericksburg

William Wallace Burns (September 3, 1825 – April 19, 1892) was a career American soldier who served in the Union Army during the American Civil War, reaching the rank of brigadier general in the volunteer army. He was among the commanders of the famed Philadelphia Brigade.

== Birth and early years ==
Burns was born in Coshocton, Ohio, son of future U.S. congressman Joseph Burns and a distant relative of George Washington through his mother's family. He entered the United States Military Academy in 1842 and graduated 28th in his class in 1847, a year late due to failing English as a freshman. He accepted a commission as a second lieutenant in the infantry and served in the Mexican–American War without seeing any combat. He was then assigned to various army posts in the Old West and Southwest, marrying in Arkansas in 1849. He served on recruiting duty in Philadelphia from 1854 to 1856 and then as a regimental quartermaster in Florida during the Third Seminole War (1856–1857). After the conclusion of that conflict, Burns was part of an expedition sent to Utah in 1857 to quell Mormon unrest. In 1858, he accepted a staff commission to serve as Chief Commissary of Subsistence for Albert Sidney Johnston, with the rank of captain.

== Civil War ==
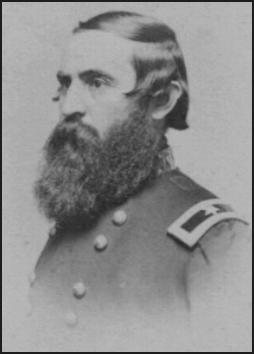
Burns during the Civil War

Burns was stationed at Fort Smith, Arkansas, when the war began, narrowly avoiding capture when that place fell to Confederate militia forces on April 23, 1861. He returned to Ohio after the fort's capture and was quickly appointed as chief of commissary on the staff of Major General George B. McClellan in May 1861. Burns served in that capacity during McClellan's successful campaign in western Virginia that summer, and was promoted to the Regular Army rank of major in August 1861. However, Burns wanted a combat command; he got his wish that fall, receiving a promotion to brigadier general of volunteers in September, and being placed in command of the Philadelphia Brigade in October, after the death of their previous commander at the Battle of Ball's Bluff.

Burns commanded the Philadelphia Brigade for just over a year (October 1861 – November 1862), most notably during McClellan's Peninsular Campaign in the spring and summer of 1862. He led the brigade in a pivotal role at the Battle of Savage's Station (June 29), a rear-guard action fought to protect the Army of the Potomac as it retreated from Richmond. Despite receiving a painful facial wound, Burns and his brigade successfully drove off a Confederate attack and allowed the Union withdrawal to continue without interference. His brigade played another important role in the Battle of Glendale on the following day, fending off a Confederate attack that had already routed one Union division, and helping to prevent the strung-out Union army from being cut in half. Perhaps his greatest contribution to history occurred earlier in the campaign; during the Battle of Fair Oaks (May 31), Burns had ordered his men to assist an artillery battery that had gotten stuck on a rickety plank bridge over a flooded river. Burns's men helped move the cannon off the bridge and through the mud on the other side, allowing the battery to be in place in time to play a significant role in driving off the last Confederate attack of the day. Even more importantly, a shot fired by that battery severely wounded Confederate General Joseph E. Johnston, who was replaced after the battle by Robert E. Lee.

Burns's facial wound grew infected, causing him to miss several months of fighting as he recuperated. He served as a division commander during the Battle of Fredericksburg in December 1862, after which he moved on to the Western theater, believing that he was going to be promoted to major general and receive a corps command in the Army of the Cumberland under William S. Rosecrans. Unfortunately, Burns's promotion was never approved by Congress, and he could not take command of a corps without it. Burns believed that his promotion had been deliberately blocked by Secretary of War Edwin M. Stanton, as punishment for being a strong supporter of General McClellan, a man Stanton despised (no evidence has yet been found that Stanton ever did this). Despite pleas from friends to not act rashly, Burns decided to take his case directly to President Abraham Lincoln; he submitted his resignation as a general in the Volunteer army to Lincoln, hoping that the president would turn it down and force Stanton to allow his promotion. Instead, Lincoln accepted Burns's resignation without comment, forcing him to return to his career in the Commissary department. He never commanded troops in combat again, and he never got his promotion to major general.

Later, he became chief commissary officer of the Department of the Northwest and, during the last part of the war, was chief commissary of the Department of the South. He briefly served (19 days) as the military mayor of Charleston, South Carolina in 1868. He was appointed on February 19, 1868. On the evening of February 20, 1868, out-going Mayor Gaillard arrived with Burns; Gaillard addressed city council and, after introducing Burns, explained that Burns would not be sworn into office in the normal fashion because of the manner in which he came to office.

He received the brevet of brigadier general in 1865 and was on duty in the Commissary Department at Washington, D.C. until 1889, when he retired, with the Regular Army rank of colonel.

He is buried at Arlington National Cemetery.

== See also ==
- List of American Civil War generals (Union)

Preceded by Peter Charles Gaillard	Mayor of Charleston, South Carolina; 1868	Succeeded by Milton Cogswell
