= George W. Cole =

American physician and Union Army officer, (1827–1875)

George Washington Cole
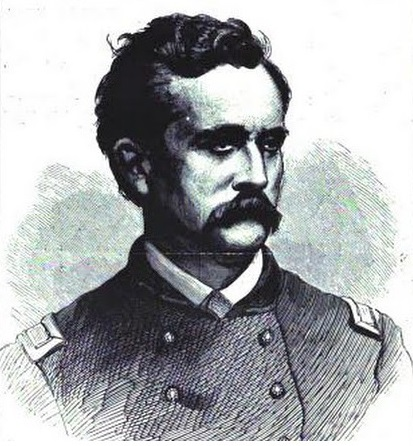
- George W. Cole, Union Army brevet major general
- Born: March 26, 1827; Lodi, New York, U.S.
- Died: December 9, 1875 (aged 48); Mora, New Mexico, U.S.
- Burial place: Saint Vrain Cemetery, Mora, New Mexico
- Education: State University of New York Upstate Medical University (MD)
- Spouse(s): Mary Barto, m. 1853-1875 (his death)
- Children: 2
- Relatives: Cornelius Cole (brother)
- Military career
- Allegiance: United States
- Branch: American Civil War
- Service years: 1861–1865
- Rank: Major General (brevet)
- Unit: Union Army
- Commands: Company H, 12th New York Volunteer Infantry; Cole's Battalion, 3rd New York Volunteer Cavalry; 2nd United States Colored Cavalry Regiment
- Conflicts: American Civil War; First Battle of Bull Run; Battle of Kinston; Siege of Petersburg
- Other work: Physician; Businessman; Farmer

George W. Cole (March 26, 1827 – December 9, 1875) was an officer in the Union Army during the American Civil War. His wartime commands included the 2nd United States Colored Cavalry Regiment, and he attained the rank of major general by brevet. In 1867 Cole was accused of murder after he killed L. Harris Hiscock, a member of the New York State Assembly. Cole accused Hiscock of an affair with Mrs. Cole; his first trial ended with a hung jury, and he was acquitted at the second on the grounds of "momentary insanity".

== Early life ==
Cole was born in Lodi, New York on March 26, 1827., the son of David Cole and Rachel Townsend (a descendant of early settlers John Townsend and Thomas Cornell). Among his siblings was Cornelius Cole, who served as a United States senator from California. He attended Wesleyan University, and left after three years to begin the study of medicine. Cole received his medical degree from Geneva Medical College, now known as State University of New York Upstate Medical University in 1850, and practiced medicine, owned a drug store, and operated a farm. In 1853 he married Mary Barto; their children include daughters Fanny and Alice. In 1857 he moved to Syracuse, where he became a partner in a lumber business, in which he remained active until the outbreak of the American Civil War.

== Civil War ==
Cole served as a captain and commander of Company H in the 12th New York Volunteer Infantry, became a major and battalion commander in the 3rd New York Volunteer Cavalry, and then became commander of the 2nd United States Colored Cavalry Regiment with the rank of colonel. During the war, Cole took part in several engagements, including the First Battle of Bull Run. He was wounded, and also suffered serious internal injuries after his horse fell on him during a cavalry charge. He was subsequently promoted to brigadier general and major general, both by brevet, in recognition of his superior service.

== Killing of L. Harris Hiscock ==
On June 4, 1867, Cole shot and killed L. Harris Hiscock in Albany. Hiscock was a member of the New York State Assembly, a delegate to the 1867 state constitutional convention, and a friend of Cole's. Cole accused Hiscock of having an affair with Mrs. Cole while Cole was away serving in the army. He was charged with murder; defended by Amasa J. Parker, his first trial ended in a hung jury, and he was acquitted at his second on the grounds of "momentary insanity".

== Later life ==
After he was acquitted, the Coles remained married, but lived separately; Mrs. Cole lived with her brother Henry in Trumansburg, New York. George Cole worked in the registrar's office of the New York City Post Office. In 1874 he moved to New Mexico in search of a drier climate, which was necessitated by injuries and illness related to his military service. While living in New Mexico, Cole was active in real estate speculation and resumed the practice of medicine.

== Death and burial ==
Cole did not recover his health; he died in Mora, New Mexico from the effects of pneumonia on December 9, 1875. He was buried at Saint Vrain Cemetery in Mora.

New York State Assembly
Preceded by Silas L. Snyder	New York State Assembly; Oneida County, 4th District; 1867	Succeeded by Leander W. Fiske
