= Charles F. Rand =

American Civil War Medal of Honor recipient (1839–1908)

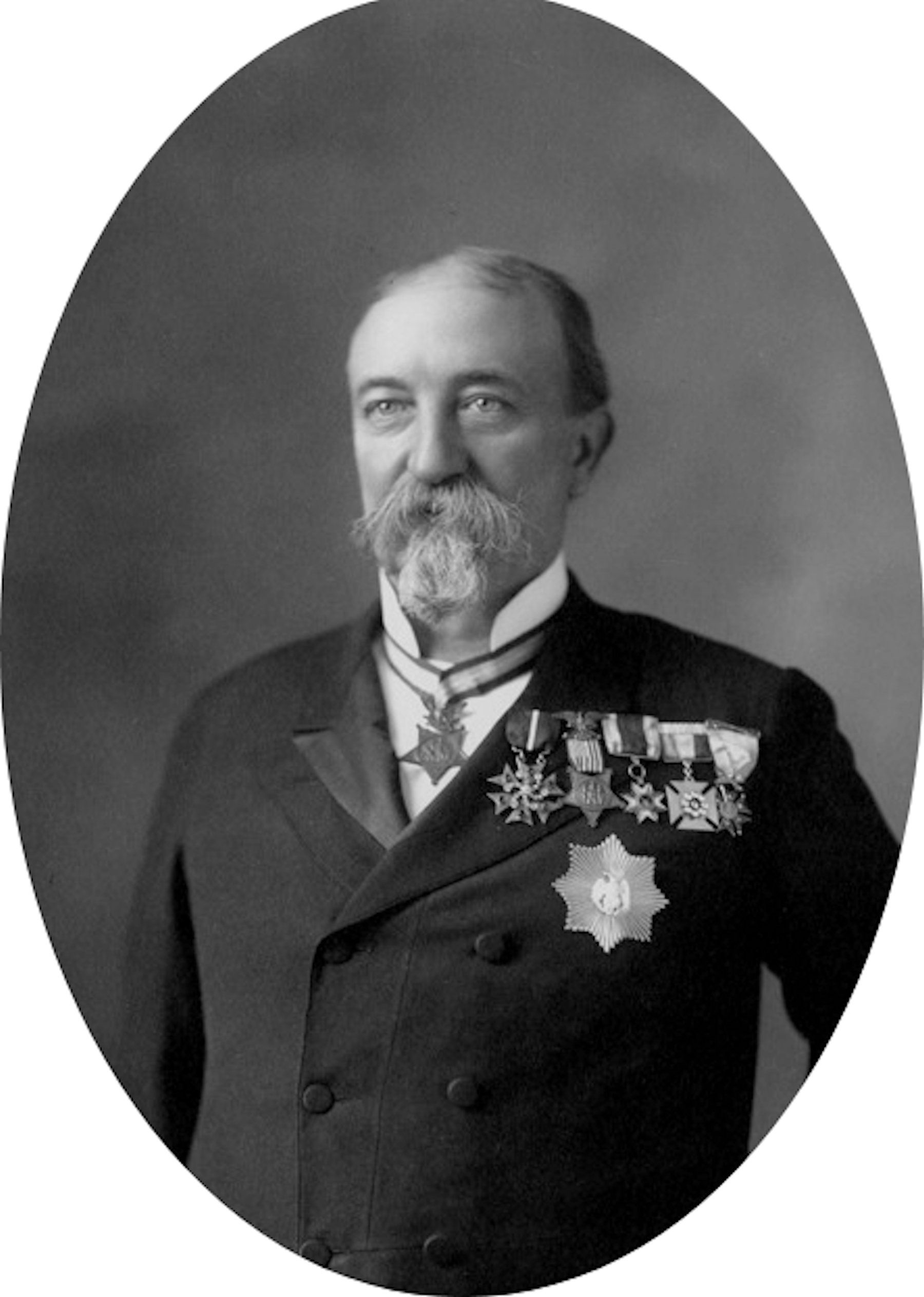
Charles Franklin Rand

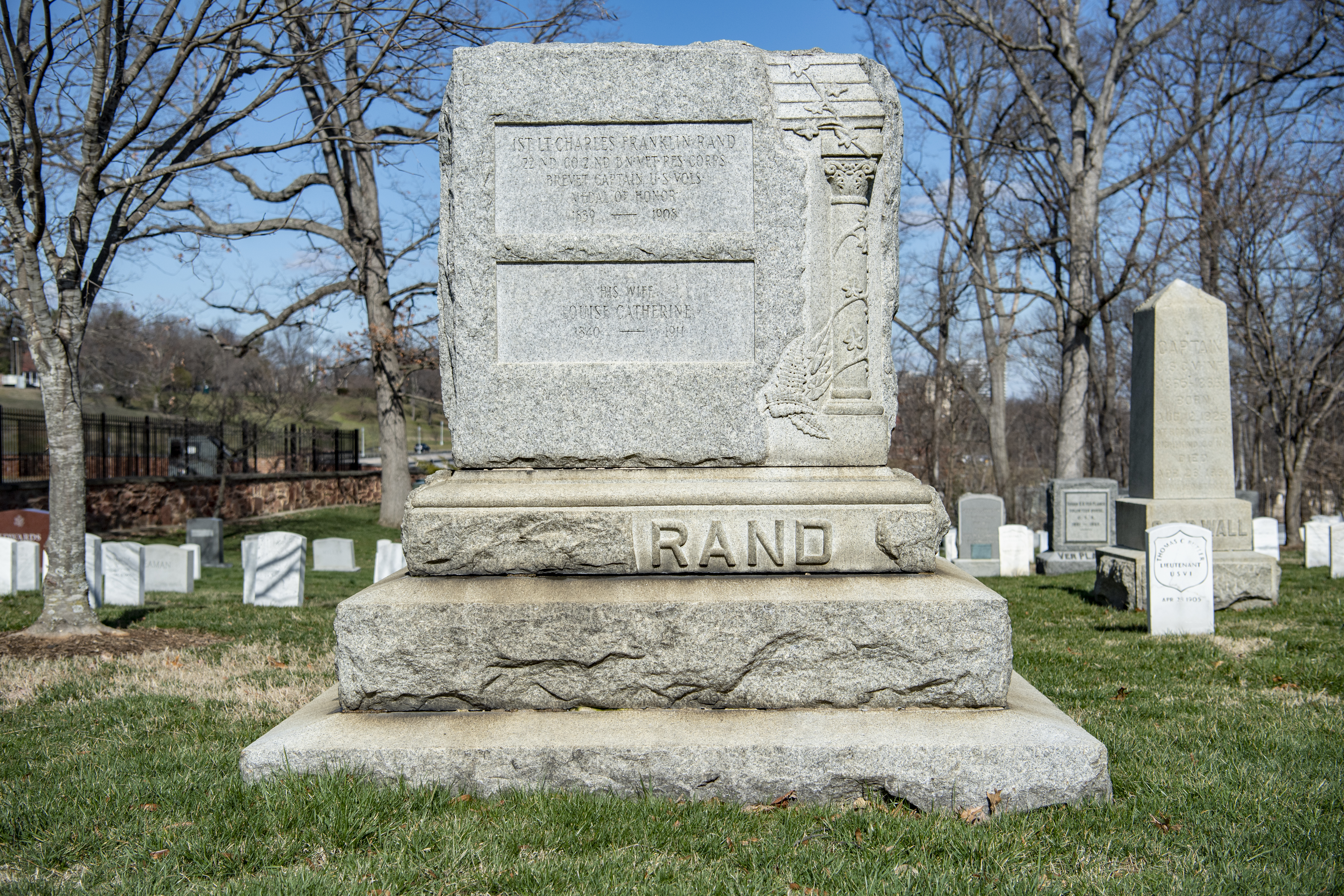
Grave at Arlington National Cemetery

Charles Franklin Rand (January 19, 1839 – October 13, 1908) was an American Civil War Medal of Honor recipient. He received the award for his actions at the Battle of Blackburn's Ford, Virginia, when he stayed in action when a part of his regiment broke in disorder; he then joined another company and fought with it through the remainder of the engagement. Following the war he earned a medical degree and worked as a physician in Batavia, New York. Rand is buried at Arlington National Cemetery.

== Early years ==
Rand was born in Batavia, New York, on January 19, 1839, to James Rand and Angeline Smith Rand. He worked as a printer until the Civil War broke out when he was 22.

== Military service ==
Rand volunteered for military service when a telegram was read in Batavia announcing Lincoln's call for 75,000 volunteers. He was the first to join the Union war efforts from Batavia, and was one of the first in the country to do so. His unit, Company K of the 12th New York Volunteers, traveled to Virginia and fought at Blackburn's Ford during the First Battle of Bull Run in July 1861. When part of his regiment fled the battle, Rand remained, continued to fight using an old musket, and joined another unit. During the Battle of Gaine's Mill in June 1862, Rand was shot in the shoulder, captured, and imprisoned at Savage's Station, Virginia. He was exchanged soon thereafter, and mustered out to the Veteran Reserve Corps on August 30, 1862, as a 1st lieutenant. At the end of the war he assisted with Reconstruction in Texas as sub-assistant commissioner of the Bureau of Refugees, Freedmen, and Abandoned Lands.

== Medal of Honor citation ==
Rand was awarded the Medal of Honor on October 23, 1897, for his action at Blackburn's Ford. The citation reads:

The President of the United States of America, in the name of Congress, takes pleasure in presenting the Medal of Honor to Private Charles Franklin Rand, United States Army, for extraordinary heroism on 18 July 1861, while serving with Company K, 12th New York Infantry (Independence Guard), in action at Blackburn's Ford, Virginia. Private Rand remained in action when a part of his regiment broke in disorder, joined another company, and fought with it through the remainder of the engagement.

Because there were no witnesses to Rand's action, he tried unsuccessfully for years to be recognized. In 1892, former Confederate officers prepared affidavits about the events at Blackburn's Ford, providing the information needed for the award.

== Postwar years ==
In 1873, Rand earned a medical degree from Georgetown University. He practiced medicine in Batavia from 1879 to 1889. He married Louise Catherine Wheeler in 1889 and moved to Washington, D.C. Rand died on October 13, 1908, and was buried at Arlington National Cemetery (sect. 1-125-B.)
