= L. Harris Hiscock =

American politician

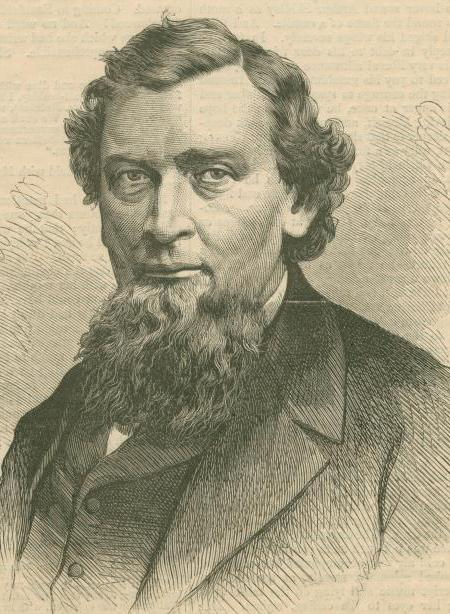
- Digital Images Collection, New York Public Library

Member of the New York State Assembly from Onondaga County's 2nd District
- In office 1865–1867
- Preceded by: Thomas G. Alvord
- Succeeded by: Luke Ranney

Judge of the Onondaga County Surrogate's Court
- In office 1852–1856
- Preceded by: Isaac T. Minard
- Succeeded by: Amasa H. Jerome

Personal details
- Born: May 2, 1824 Pompey, New York, US
- Died: June 4, 1867 (aged 42) Albany, New York, US
- Resting place: Oakwood Cemetery, Syracuse, New York
- Party: Democratic (before 1861); Republican (from 1861)
- Spouse: Lucy Bridgman
- Relations: Frank Hiscock (brother)
- Children: 2, including Frank H. Hiscock
- Occupation: Attorney

Luther Harris Hitchcock (May 2, 1824 – June 4, 1867) was a New York attorney, judge, and legislator. He was murdered by George W. Cole, a major general in the American Civil War and brother of Cornelius Cole.

== Biography ==
Known as L. Harris Hiscock, he was born in Pompey, New York on May 2, 1824. He taught school while studying law with Daniel Gott, and served as Pompey's School Superintendent from 1845 to 1847.

In 1848, he began to practice law in Tully. From 1849 to 1851, he was Pompey's Justice of the Peace.

Hiscock later moved to Syracuse, and in 1855, he founded with his brother Frank the law firm known today as Hiscock and Barclay. L. Harris Hiscock was prominent in Democratic politics and served as Onondaga County Surrogate Judge from 1852 to 1856.

In 1865, by now a Republican as a result of his pro-Union position during the American Civil War, Harris was elected to the New York State Assembly, and he served until his death.

While in Albany as a delegate to the state constitutional convention, Hiscock was murdered on June 4, 1867, by George W. Cole, a major general in the Union Army who accused Hiscock of having an affair with Mrs. Cole. Cole was acquitted at his 1868 trial on the grounds of "momentary insanity."

Hiscock was buried at Oakwood Cemetery in Syracuse.

== Family ==
L. Harris Hiscock was the brother and law partner of U.S. Senator Frank Hiscock. He was married to Lucy Bridgman (1828–1861). They were the parents of two children, including Judge Frank H. Hiscock.

New York State Assembly
Preceded by Thomas G. Alvord	New York State Assembly; Onondaga County, 2nd District; 1865–1867	Succeeded by Luke Ranney
