= 3rd New York Cavalry Regiment =

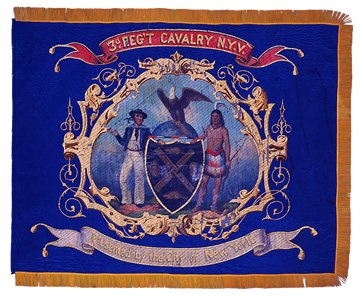
- Active: July 17, 1861 to July 21, 1865
- Country: United States
- Allegiance: Union
- Branch: Union Army
- Role: Cavalry
- Engagements: American Civil War: Battle of Edward's Ferry; North Carolina Expedition; Battle of Tranter's Creek (Co. I); Battle of Kinston; Battle of White Hall; Battle of Goldsborough Bridge; Battle of Fort Anderson (detachment); Battle of Washington (1 Co.); Siege of Petersburg; First Battle of Ream's Station; First Battle of Deep Bottom; Battle of Yellow Tavern; Battle of Jerusalem Plank Road

The 3rd New York Cavalry Regiment ("Van Alen Cavalry") was a cavalry regiment that served in the Union Army during the American Civil War.

== Service ==
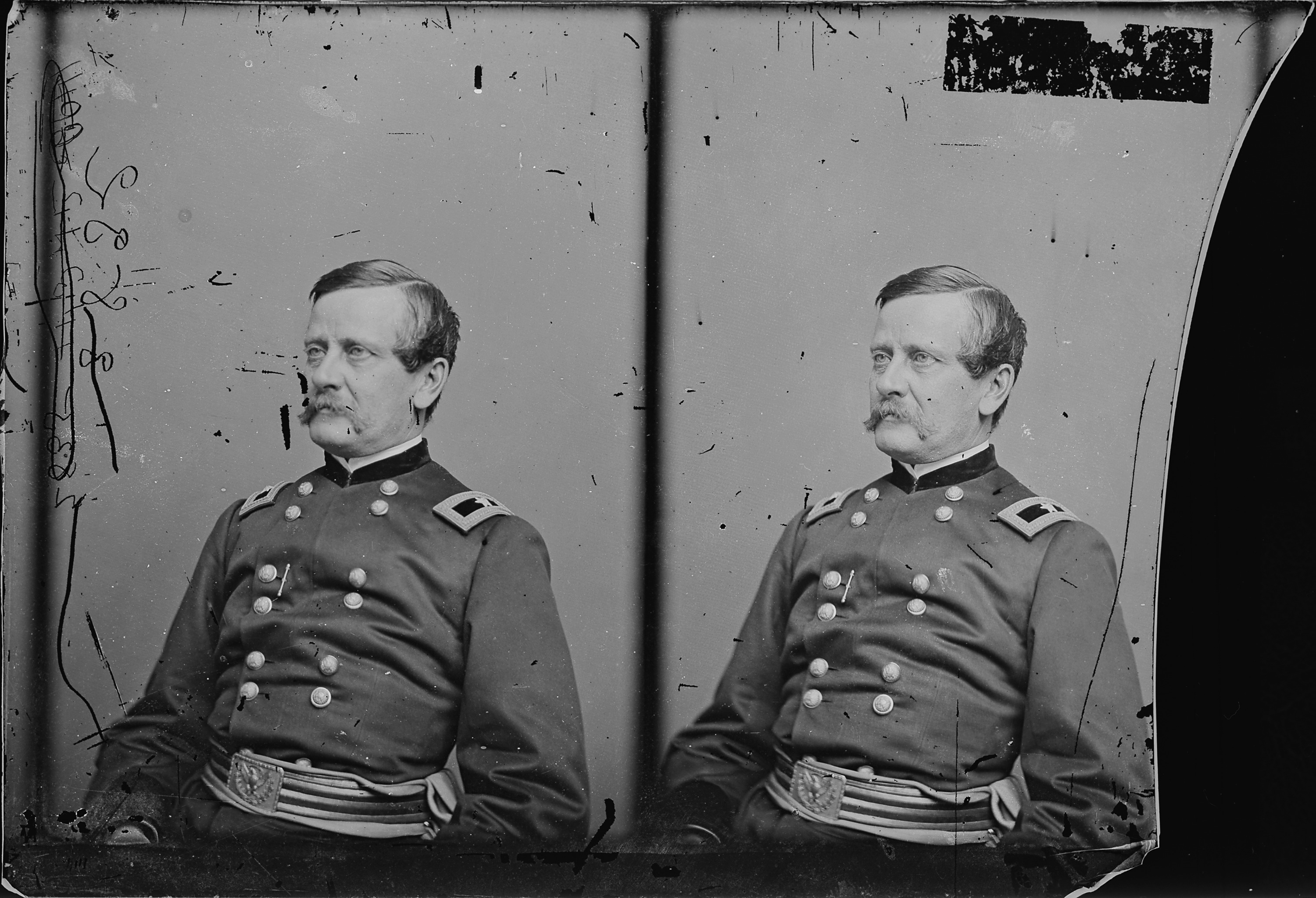
James H. Van Alen, commander of the 3rd New York Volunteer Cavalry.

The 3rd New York Cavalry was organized by companies beginning in July 1861 and mustered in September 9, 1861 at Meridian Hill, Washington, D.C. under the command of Colonel James H. Van Alen.

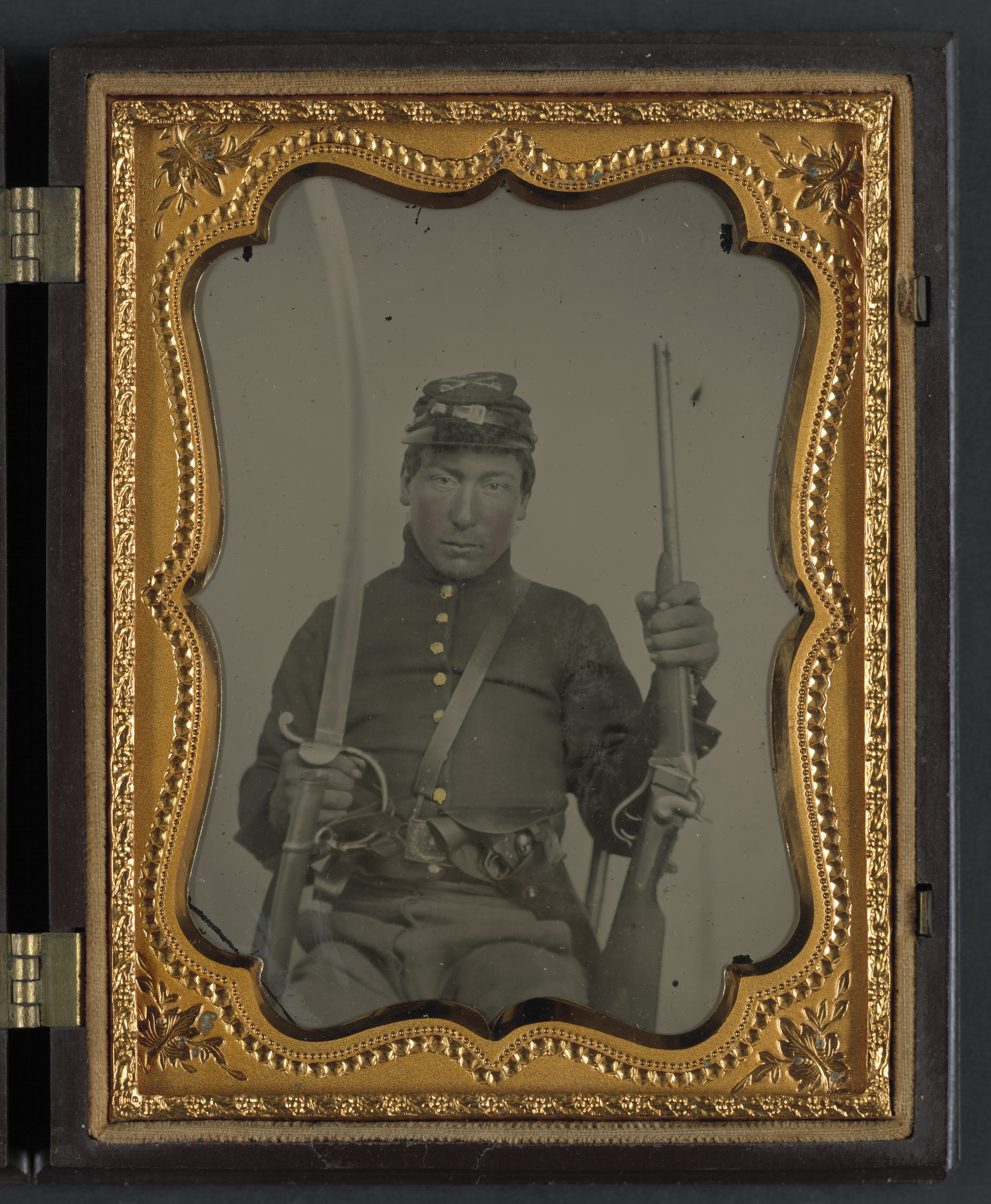
Corporal Elias Warner or Warnear of Company K, 3rd New York Cavalry Regiment with 1852 Slant Breech Sharps carbine and cavalry saber

The regiment was attached to Banks' Division, Army of the Potomac (5 companies), and Stone's Division, Army of the Potomac (6 companies), to December 1861. Stone's Corps of Observation to March 1862. Defenses of Washington, D.C., to April 1862. Unattached, Department of North Carolina, to December 1862. Unattached, XVIII Corps, Department of North Carolina, to May 1863. Cavalry Brigade, XVIII Corps, to July 1863. Defenses of New Bern, North Carolina, Department of Virginia and North Carolina, to October 1863. Heckman's Command, Newport News, Virginia, Department of Virginia and North Carolina, to December 1863. Heckman's Command, Portsmouth, Virginia, Department of Virginia and North Carolina, to April 1864. 1st Brigade, August Kautz's Cavalry Division, Army of the James, Department of Virginia and North Carolina, to December 1864. Norfolk, Virginia, to January 1865. Portsmouth, Virginia, to March 1865. Suffolk, Virginia, to June 1865. Norfolk, Virginia, to July 1865.

The 3rd New York Cavalry ceased to exist on July 21, 1865 when it was consolidated with the 1st New York Mounted Rifles to form the 4th New York Provisional Cavalry.

== Detailed service ==
Duty in the defenses of Washington, D.C., and on the Upper Potomac until April 1862. Operations on the Potomac October 21–24, 1861. Near Goose Creek and on Leesburg Road October 21. Ball's Bluff October 21. Near Edward's Ferry October 22. Bunker Hill, Va., March 5, 1862. Winchester March 10. Ordered to the Department of North Carolina April 6. Haughton's Mills April 27. Near Burnt Church May 7. Reconnaissance toward Trenton May 15–16. Trenton Bridge May 15. Young's Cross Roads and Pollocksville May 15–16. Tranter's Creek May 30 (Company I). Greenville Road May 81. Tranter's Creek June 2, 5, and 24 (Company I). Swift Creek Bridge June 28 (detachment). Tranter's Creek July 10. Expedition to Trenton and Pollocksville July 24–28. Trenton and Pollocksville July 25. Mill Creek July 26 (Company K). Pollocksville July 26 (Company K). Reconnaissance to Young's Cross Roads July 26–29 (detachments). Near Young's Cross Roads July 27. Trenton and Kinston Road August 6. Reconnaissance to Swansboro August 14–15. Washington, N.C., September 6 (Companies D, G, H, I, and L). Tranter's Creek September 9. Washington October 5 Pingo Creek October 29. Expedition from New Bern October 30-November 12. Rawle's Mills November 2. Near Tarboro November 5. Demonstration on New Bern November 11. Core Creek November 18. Foster's Expedition to Goldsborough December 11–20. Kinston Road December 11–12. Southwest Creek December 13–14. Kinston December 14. Whitehall Bridge December 15. Olive Station, Goshen Swamp, and Whitehall December 16. Dudley Station, Thompson's Bridge, and Goldsborough December 17. Core Creek January 8, 1863. Reconnaissance to Pollocksville, Tranter's, Young's Cross Roads, and Onslow January 17–21. Pollocksville and Northeast River January 17. Near Tranter's January 18. Young's Cross Roads January 18–19. White Oak Creek January 19. Near Jacksonville January 20. Sandy Ridge and near Washington February 13. Near New Bern February 27. Expedition to Swann's Quarter March 1–6 (Company F). Near Fairfield March 3 (Company F). Skeet March 3. Near Fairfield and Swann's Quarter March 3–4 (Company F). Demonstration on Kinston March 6–8 (Companies A, E, and H). Core Creek March 7 (Companies A, E, and H). Dover March 7 (Company H). Expedition to Mattamuskeet Lake March 7–14 (Company F). Deep Gully New Bern, March 13–14 (detachment). Siege of Washington March 30-April 20 (1 company). White Forks April 3. Gum Swamp April 4. Swann's Quarter April 4. Rodman's Point April 4–5 (1 company). Near Dover, Core Creek, and Young's Cross Roads April 7. Little Swift Creek April 8. Blount's and Swift Creek April 9. Expedition to Swift Creek Village April 13–21 (detachment). Trent Road April 13–14. Near New Bern April 15. Peletier's Mills April 16. Expedition toward Kinston April 16–21 (Company H). Expedition to Little Washington April 17–19 (detachment). Railroad Crossing, Core Creek, April 17–18. Big Swift Creek April 19. Sandy Ridge April 20 (Company H). Expedition toward Kinston April 27-May 1 (detachment). Wise's Cross Roads and Dover Road April 28. Near Core Creek April 29. Core Creek April 30. Evans' Mills May 5. Peletter's Mills May 5 (4 companies). Stony Creek May 7 (4 companies). Demonstration on Kinston May 20–23 (4 companies). Gum Swamp May 22 (4 companies). Bachelor's Creek May 23. Washington May 24. Tranter's Creek, Jacksonville. May 31-June 2. Plymouth June 16. Scout to ? Creek June 17–18. Raid on Wilmington & Weldon Railroad July 3–7 (detachment). Trenton July 8. Hallsville July 4. Warsaw and Kenensville July 5. Tar River Expedition July 18–24. Swift Creek July 18. Near Greenville July 19. Tarboro and Rocky Mount Station July 20. Sparta July 20. Hookerstown July 21. Swift Creek and Street's Ferry July 22. Scupperton July 22. Pollocksville July 26. Near New Bern October 7. Camden Court House and Dismal Swamp November 3. Operations about New Bern against Whiting January 18-February 4, 1864. Wistar's Expedition toward Richmond February 6–8, 1864. Bettom's Bridge and Baltimore Cross Roads February 7. Kautz's Raid against Petersburg & Weldon Railroad May 5–11. Wall's Bridge May 5. Stony Creek Station, Weldon Railroad, May 7. Nottaway Railroad Bridge May 8. White's Bridge, Nottaway River, May 8–9. Kautz's Raid on Richmond & Danville Railroad May 12–17. Flat Creek Bridge, near Chula Depot, May 14. Belcher's Mills May 16. Bermuda Hundred May 17–30. Near Hatcher's Run June 2. Near Petersburg June 9. Baylor's Farm June 15. Assaults on Petersburg June 15–18. Siege operations against Petersburg and Richmond June 16-December 1, 1864. Wilson's Raid on South Side & Danville Railroad June 22–30. Roanoke Bridge June 25. Sappony Church or Stony Creek June 28. Ream's Station June 29. Deep Bottom July 27–29. Malvern Hill August 1. Yellow Tavern August 19–21. Ream's Station August 23–25. Lee's Mills August 31. Reconnaissance to Sycamore Church September 5–6. Prince George Court House September 15. Jerusalem Plank Road and Sycamore Church September 16. Prince George Court House September 22. Chaffin's Farm September 28–30. Charles City Cross Roads October 1. Derbytown Road October 7 and 13. Johnson's Farm and New Market Road October 7. Chaffin's Farm October 8. Charles City Cross Roads October 20. Fair Oaks October 27–28. Charles City Cross Roads November 1. Darbytown Road November 15. Moved to Norfolk, Va., December, and duty there until January 1865. Operations about Broadwater Ferry, Chowan River, December 11–19. Duty at Suffolk, Portsmouth and Norfolk until July. Scout to South Quay January 2, 1865 (Companies A, B, C, H, and L). Expedition to Murfree's Depot, N.C., March 10–11. South Quay March 11.

== Casualties ==
The regiment lost a total of 199 men during service; 3 officers and 45 enlisted men killed or mortally wounded, 1 officer and 150 enlisted men died of disease.

== Commanders ==
- Colonel James H. Van Alen - promoted
- Colonel Simon H. Mix - mortally wounded
- Colonel George W. Lewis

== Notable members ==
- Major George W. Cole - commissioned colonel of the 2nd United States Colored Cavalry Regiment and attained rank of brevet major general.
- Captain George Edward Gouraud - Medal of Honor recipient for action at Honey Hill, November 30, 1864

== See also ==
- List of New York Civil War regiments
- New York in the American Civil War
