= James E. Cross =

American Civil War Medal of Honor recipient

- Born: March 27, 1840; Darien, New York
- Died: January 6, 1917 (aged 76); Albany, New York
- Burial place: Albany Rural Cemetery, Menands, New York
- Military career
- Allegiance: United States of America
- Branch: United States Army; Union Army
- Rank: Corporal
- Unit: (New York (state)) 12th New York Infantry - Company K
- Awards: Medal of Honor

Corporal James Edwin Cross (March 27, 1840 - January 6, 1917) was an American soldier who fought in the American Civil War. Cross received the country's highest award for bravery during combat, the Medal of Honor, for his action at Blackburn's Ford in Virginia on 18 July 1861. He was honored with the award on 5 April 1898.

== Biography ==
Cross was born in Darien, New York on 27 March 1840. He enlisted in the 12th New York Volunteer Infantry. He died on 6 January 1917 and his remains are interred at the Albany Rural Cemetery.

== Medal of Honor citation ==
With a companion, refused to retreat when the part of the regiment to which he was attached was driven back in disorder, but remained upon the skirmish line for some time thereafter, firing upon the enemy.

== See also ==
- List of American Civil War Medal of Honor recipients: A–F
