= Turner Gustavus Morehead =

American general

Turner Gustavus Morehead (1814–1892) was an officer in the Mexican–American War and American Civil War and Brevet Brigadier General in the Union Army.

== Early life ==
Turner Gustavus Morehead, was born at Baltimore, Maryland, on March 18, 1814, was educated and grew to young manhood in that city, but shortly after arriving of age, removed to Philadelphia, Pennsylvania. He soon joined the militia unit, the "Artillery Corps Washington Grays" in May, 1835. His unit was one called up to end the Buckshot War. At the beginning of the Mexican–American War the Greys voted not to volunteer for service, and Morehead resigned and offered his services to the state.

== Mexican-American War ==
In November 1846, he was enrolled in Philadelphia as a captain in command of Company G, First Pennsylvania Regiment, known as the "Jefferson Guards". He took an active part through to the end of the war in Scott's Mexico City Campaign, principally the engagements of the Siege of Veracruz, National Bridge, Cerro Gordo, Castle Perote, Huamantla, and the Siege of Puebla. Discharged July 29, 1848, Morehead returned to Philadelphia, but soon began his participation in the "Philadelphia Blues" Battalion.

== Civil War ==
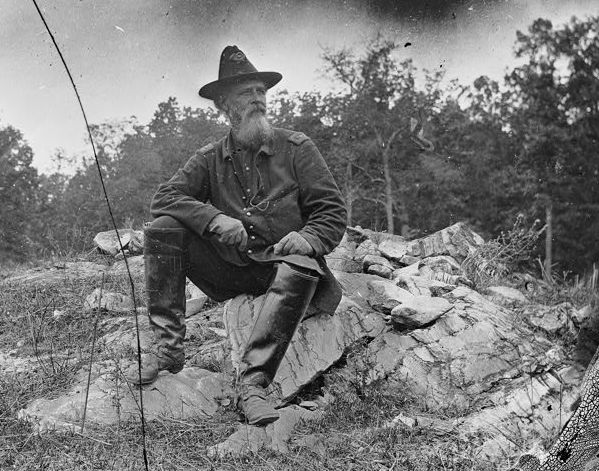
Col. Turner G. Morehead at Antietam, September 1862

As colonel commanding the Philadelphia Blues when the American Civil War broke out, Morehead immediately offered the services of his battalion to the governor of Pennsylvania. The governor accepted and ordered to expand the battalion into a full regiment which was mustered into three months of service on April 17, 1861, as the 22nd Regiment Pennsylvania Volunteers with Turner G. Morehead remaining as colonel.

The 22nd Regiment quickly proceeded to Baltimore, where it served, partly as provost guard. Colonel Morehead assumed command of the city when its police commissioners were arrested by General Banks, five companies of the 22nd were detailed for duty in the central part of the city for ten days, anticipating trouble from the large secessionist faction in the city. Other detachments of the regiment seized large quantities of arms and ammunition secreted in the city in the possession of suspected secessionists. One company was also detailed to guard a magazine in the city until the close of its term of service. At the end of its term of service, the regiment returned to Philadelphia and was mustered out on August 7, 1861.

Almost immediately, Colonel Morehead was authorized to recruit another regiment, this one for a full three years' service, and on August 21, 1861, only two weeks after being mustered out, he was again mustered in as Colonel of what afterward became the 106th Regiment Pennsylvania Volunteers, but at that time was known as the Fifth California Regiment, of Edward Dickinson Baker's California Brigade. Morehead brought with him a number of soldiers of the disbanded 22nd Regiment.

Morehead shared all the dangers of the men in his 106th Pennsylvania Infantry which went on to serve throughout the whole war. First at Ball's Bluff, then in the Peninsula Campaign where fought at Fair Oaks, Savage Station, Battle of Glendale or Charles City Cross Roads and Malvern Hill. Then he fought at Antietam and Fredericksburg. Although never wounded, Morehead was injured when his horse was shot from under him at Antietam:

Colonel Morehead's horse was shot from under him, and, falling, held him fast until released by Sergeant Joseph Taylor and Corporals McNeal and Stephen Taylor of Company C. After going some distance to the rear the Colonel found he had lost his sword, a handsome one, that had been presented to him by the Regiment, and went back after it, though urged not to do so by the men, but he said, "Yes I will, that sword was given me by my men and I told them I would protect it with my life and never see it dishonored, and I am not going to let them damned rebels get it", so he went back to where his horse lay and got it and returned in safety to the regiment although the enemy was near enough to demand his surrender, and fired at him because he refused.

Morehead was detailed frequently to the command of different brigades of the II Corps, yet he only received a brevet promotion to brigadier general on March 15, 1865, after he had resigned on April 5, 1864, returning home on account of disabilities caused by disease.

== Later life ==
After the War General Morehead engaged in the wholesale shoe business until appointed Weigher of the Port of Philadelphia, a position he held for many years. He early entered the Grand Army of the Republic, and became commander of E. D. Baker Post No. 8 of Philadelphia, also a member of the Union Veteran Legion and the Military Order of the Loyal Legion. In 1882, he moved to Asbury Park, New Jersey, where he resided until his death on May 28, 1892.

== Family ==
General Morehead was married to Louisa A. Kidd, and had three children born to them, two sons and one daughter. One son and the daughter survived him. His son, Gustavus Kidd, followed in the footsteps of his father, and early entered the National Guard in 1875. Like his father he rose to the command of the same company "The Artillery Corps Washington Grays", by then renamed Company G, First Regiment, National Guards of Pennsylvania.

== See also ==
- List of American Civil War brevet generals (Union)
