= 106th Pennsylvania Infantry Regiment =

Union Army infantry regiment

106th Pennsylvania Volunteer Infantry
- Pennsylvania flag
- Active: August 1862 to July 27, 1864
- Country: United States of America
- Allegiance: Union
- Branch: Infantry
- Engagements: Battle of Ball's Bluff; Battle of Savage's Station; Charles City Cross Roads; Battle of Malvern Hill; Battle of South Mountain; Battle of Antietam; Battle of Gettysburg; Overland Campaign; First Battle of Deep Bottom

The 106th Pennsylvania (originally raised as the 5th California) was a volunteer infantry regiment which served in the Union Army during the American Civil War. It was part of the famous Philadelphia Brigade, which helped defend against Pickett's Charge in the Battle of Gettysburg.

== History ==
The regiment was recruited from Philadelphia between August and October 1861, with the exception of company K, which was transferred from the 27th Pennsylvania Infantry. Turner G. Morehead was selected colonel of the unit, with William L. Curry as lieutenant colonel and John H. Stover as major. It moved to Poolesville, Maryland, where it became part of Edward D. Baker's "California Brigade." The 106th saw its first action at the Battle of Ball's Bluff, on October 21, 1861.

It was next transferred to the II Corps of the Army of the Potomac. With the rest of George B. McClellan's army, it fought in the Peninsula Campaign. On June 10, Lieutenant Colonel Curry was captured while visiting the picket line. During the Seven Days Battles, the regiment fought at the battles of Savage's Station, Charles City Cross Roads, and Malvern Hill.

Along with the Army of the Potomac, the 106th was transferred to Washington, D.C., too late to participate in the Second Battle of Bull Run. It did fight at the Battle of Antietam, where it was rushed with the rest of the 2nd Division to the aid of Joseph Hooker's corps in the West Woods. However, division commander John Sedgwick hastened into the fight without taking time to make an adequate reconnaissance. As a result, the division was attacked from three sides and forced to withdraw. The 106th lost one-third of its strength in this battle.

On July 3, 1863, the third day of fighting at Gettysburg, Companies A and B were sent as skirmishers to the Bliss Farm in front of Cemetery Ridge.

The 106th continued to serve through the Overland Campaign. On July 27, 1864, those eligible for discharge were sent to Washington, D.C., where they performed guard duty until September 10, when they were sent home. The rest of the regiment was consolidated into a battalion of three companies—F, H, and K. This battalion fought through the Appomattox Campaign and was discharged on June 30, 1865.

== Casualties during the war ==
- Killed and mortally wounded: 9 officers, 90 enlisted men
- Wounded: 1 officer, 94 enlisted men
- Died of disease: 24 officers, 373 enlisted men
- Captured or missing: 5 officers, 152 men
- Total casualties: 39 officers, 709 enlisted men

== See also ==
- List of Pennsylvania Civil War Units
