= James J. Van Alen =

American socialite (1848–1923)

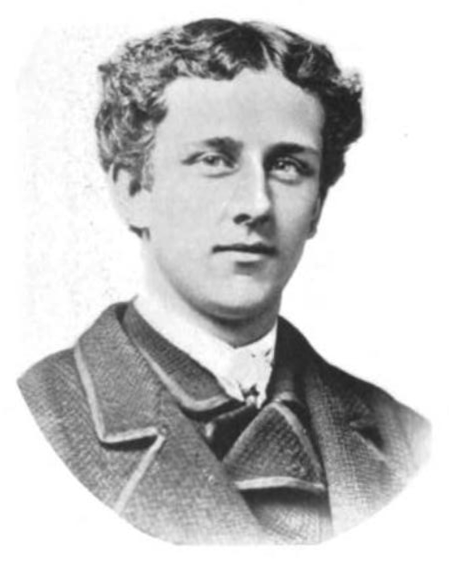
- Born: James John Van Alen; March 20, 1848; New York City, New York, U.S.
- Died: July 13, 1923 (aged 75); London, England, U.K.
- Education: Oxford University
- Spouse: Emily Astor (m. 1876; died 1881)
- Children: 3
- Parent(s): James Henry Van Alen; Mary Young Steward
- Relatives: See Astor family
- Awards: Knight of Grace of St. John of Jerusalem

James John Van Alen (March 20, 1848 – July 13, 1923) was an American socialite. He was appointed Ambassador Extraordinary and Plenipotentiary to Italy on October 20, 1893, but declined the appointment. He was well known as a New York Society leader and was referred to as the "American Prince of Wales."

== Early life ==
Van Alen was the son of James Henry Van Alen (1819–1886), who served as a Brigadier general in the Union Army during the American Civil War, and Mary Young Steward (1818–1852). He attended and graduated from Oxford University.

== Career ==
Van Alen donated $50,000 to Grover Cleveland's successful campaign for President. He was rewarded with an appointment as Ambassador Extraordinary and Plenipotentiary to Italy on October 20, 1893, but declined the appointment, owing to public disapproval. He was also rumored to have been appointed the United States Ambassador to Great Britain under President Cleveland.

His father became wealthy from real estate, which he inherited upon his death in 1886.

In 1919, he sold his house at 15 East 65th Street in Manhattan, to Rufus L. Patterson Jr., due to his opposition to Prohibition. He then lived abroad, spending most of his time at a villa in Cannes, France, from February 1920 until his death. In 1919, Van Alen stated:

I know of lots of people that will leave the United States and make their home in countries where the laws are not so strict."

In 1921, Van Alen sold eight three-story Harlem Houses in the 130th Street block, 28 to 42 West 130th Street, each on a lot 25 by 100 feet, between Fifth and Lenox Avenues to James H. Cruikshank.

== Personal life ==
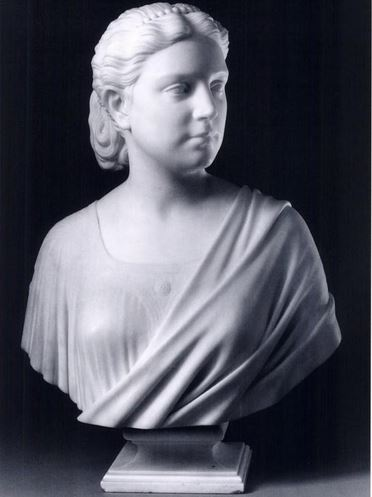
Emily Astor by Hiram Powers

In 1876, he married Emily Astor (1854–1881), the eldest daughter of William Backhouse Astor, Jr. (1829–1892) and Caroline Webster Schermerhorn (1830–1908). Together, James and Emily had three children:

- Mary Van Alen (1876–1959), who married Griswold A. Thompson (1875–1945) in 1913.
- James Laurens Van Alen (1878–1927), who married Margaret "Daisy" Louise Post (1876–1969) in 1900
- Sarah Steward Van Alen (1881–1963), who married Robert Joseph Collier (1876–1918) in 1902.

His wife died in 1881, only 5 years after they were wed.

Van Alen died in 1923 while in London. His entire estate was estimated at $20,000,000 (equivalent to $377,930,000 in 2025). After his property and stock was given to his son, and taxes were paid, the residual estate was valued at $2,061,617 (equivalent to $38,957,000 in 2025). His will provided trust funds of $500,000 (equivalent to $9,448,000 in 2025) each for his daughters, Mary and Sarah, the principal to go to their descendants. His son, James, received all real estate, property, and life estate in the residue and his grandson, James H. Van Alen, a surviving life estate. An additional trust of $12,000 (equivalent to $227,000 in 2025) was set aside for a friend, Mary M. Griffith. Upon her death, the residual went to his grandchildren.

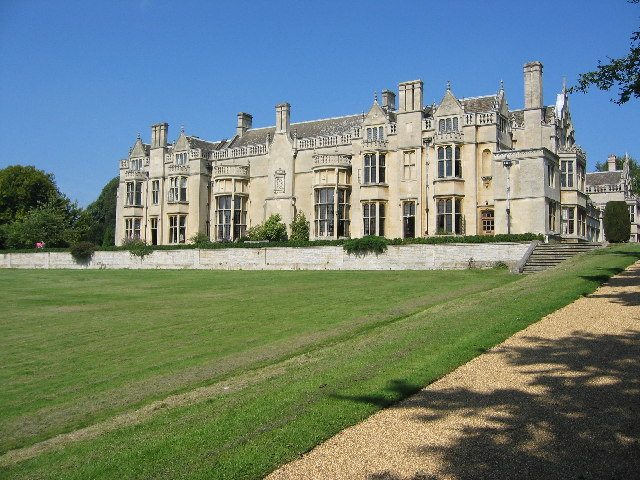
Rushton Hall in Northamptonshire, England

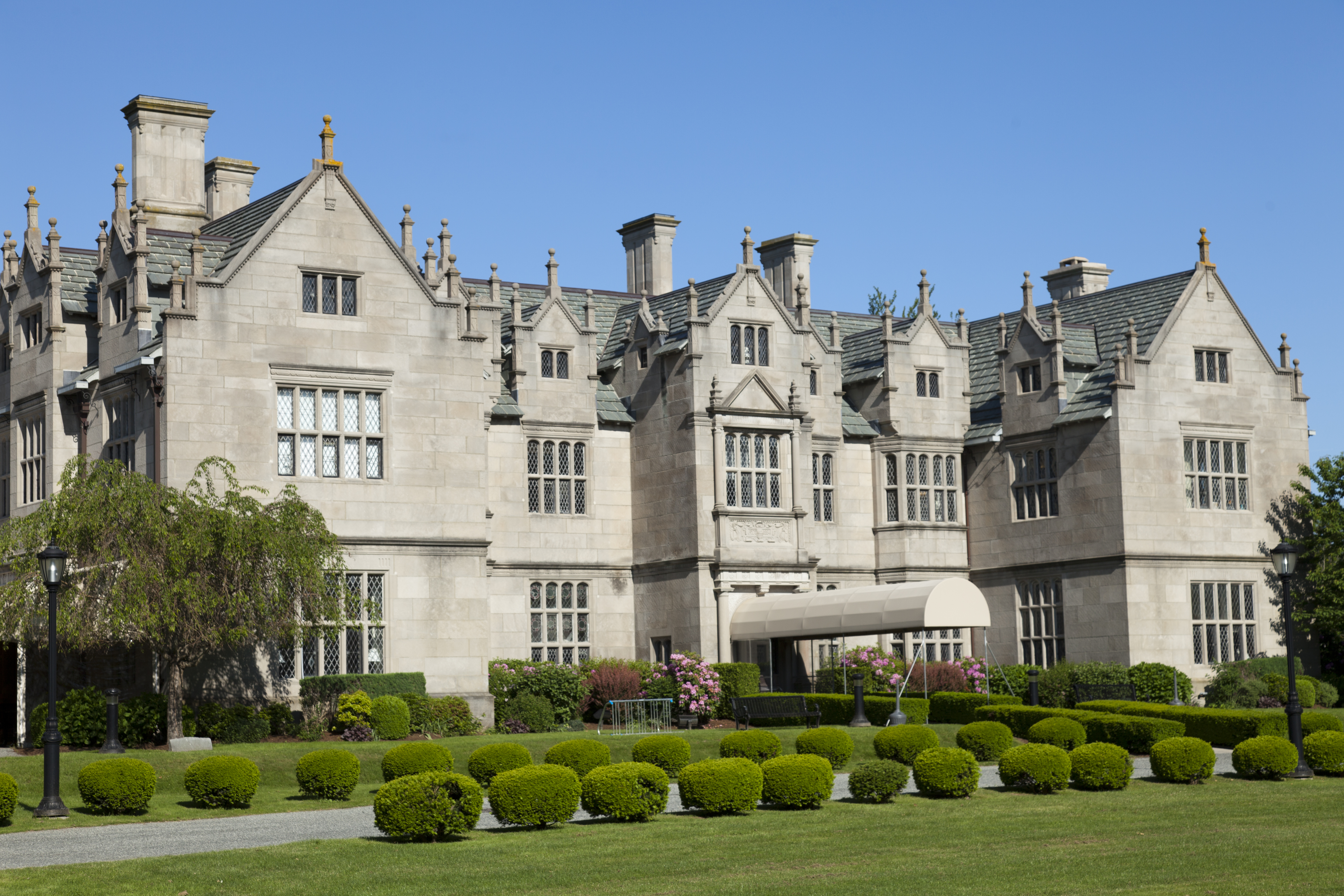
Van Alen's Newport residence

=== Residences ===
Van Alen was one of several very rich men who rented, but did not buy, Rushton Hall in Northamptonshire, England, from the Clarke-Thornhill family. Rushton was the ancestral home of the Tresham family. The estate is about 227 acres (92 ha) of which 30 acres (12 ha) are formal gardens. The River Ise flows from west to east south of the Hall.

Van Alen's father had a home in Newport, Rhode Island, called "The Grange" and lived there year-round. In 1887, seven years after his wife's death in 1881, Van Alen's father gave him the land and he commissioned American architect Dudley Newton to build a replica of Wakehurst Place in Newport from plans designed by Charles Eamer Kempe. When completed the home had cost Van Alen some $750,000 (equivalent to $26,875,000 in 2025). Salve Regina University purchased the mansion from the Van Alen family in 1972.

=== Descendants ===
His two daughters did not have children, however his son, James Laurens Van Alen, had three children. James' eldest child was James Henry "Jimmy" Van Alen II (1902–1991), the founder of the International Tennis Hall of Fame, who married Eleanor Langley. His second born was William Laurens Van Alen (1907–2003), founding president of the United States Court Tennis Association, who married Elizabeth Brinton Kent, daughter of Arthur Atwater Kent, in 1931. His youngest, and only daughter was Louise Astor Van Alen (1910–1998). Louise was married three times, first in 1931 to Prince Alexei Mdivani (1905–1936). They divorced in 1932 when Mdivani left her to marry Woolworth heiress Barbara Hutton. In 1936, after Alexei's death, she married Prince Sergei Mdivani (1903–1936), her first husband's older brother. Sergei tragically died later that year in a polo accident. In 1947, she married for the third and final time, to Alexander Saunderson (1917–2004), grandson of Edward J. Saunderson (1837–1906), an MP and Lord Lieutenant of Cavan.
