= 69th Pennsylvania Infantry Regiment =

Union Army volunteer infantry regiment

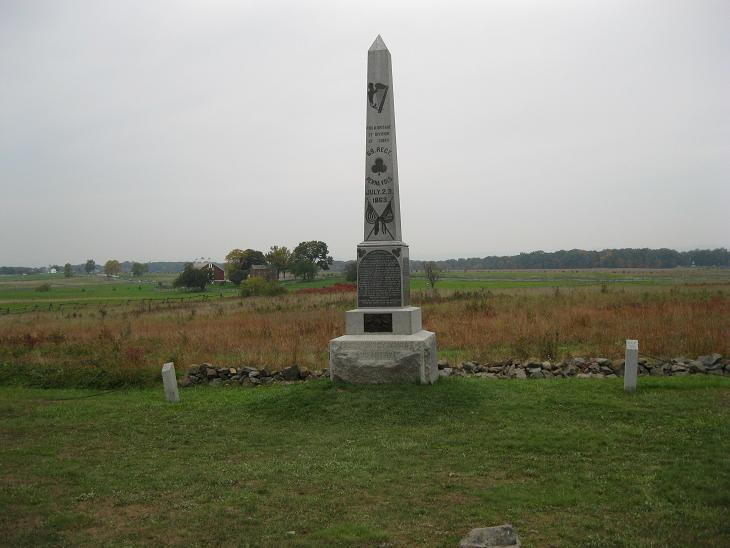
- The 69th Pennsylvania monument at Gettysburg looking west. Pickett's Charge started at the trees in the distance and advanced directly toward the camera.
- Active: August 19, 1861 - July 1, 1865
- Country: United States
- Allegiance: Union
- Branch: Union Army
- Type: Volunteer Infantry Regiment
- Part of: 2nd Brigade, 2nd Division, II Corps, Army of the Potomac
- Nicknames: The Rock of Erin (Earned at Gettysburg); Baker Zouaves (Companies I and K); Paddy Owen's Regulars; The Irish Volunteers
- Colors: United States National and Irish Green
- Engagements: Battle of Ball's Bluff; Peninsula Campaign; Second Battle of Bull Run; Battle of Chantilly; Battle of Antietam; Battle of Fredericksburg; Battle of Chancellorsville; Battle of Gettysburg; Battle of the Wilderness; Battle of Spotsylvania; Battle of Cold Harbor; Siege of Petersburg; Appomattox Campaign

Commanders
- Colonel of the Regiment: Joshua T. Owen; Dennis O'Kane
- Notable commanders: Joshua T. Owen; Dennis O'Kane

The 69th Pennsylvania Infantry (originally raised as the 2nd California) was an infantry regiment in the Union army during the American Civil War.

Part of the famed Philadelphia Brigade, this all-volunteer regiment played a key role defending against Pickett's Charge during the Battle of Gettysburg. According to the Pennsylvania Capitol Preservation Committee, "The 69th regiment was the only regiment to maintain its position throughout the repulse of Pickett's Charge, though every field officer was shot down."

This regiment was nicknamed "Paddy Owen's Regulars" in recognition of the regiment's first commanding officer and of the regiment's large contingent of men of Irish heritage.

== History ==
=== 1861 ===
The 69th Pennsylvania was recruited from Philadelphia Irish militia companies of the 2nd Regiment, Pennsylvania Militia, which had been composed of members of the Emmett Guards, Hibernian Greens, Irish Volunteers, Jackson Guards, Meagher Guards, Patterson Light Guards, Shields Guards, and the United Guards."

The regiment was mustered into service on August 19, 1861, with Joshua T. Owen as its first colonel. Dennis O'Kane was second in command of the regiment. A native of Derry, Ireland who was operating a saloon in Philadelphia at the start of the American Civil War, he had a reputation as a stern disciplinarian.

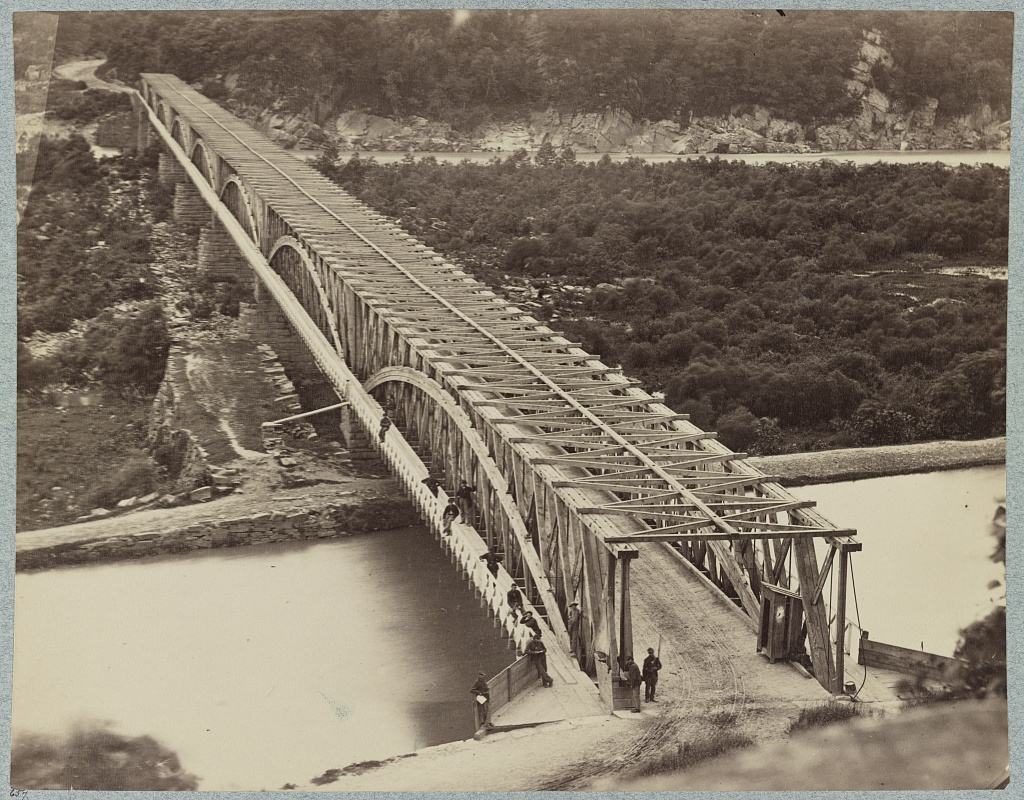
American Civil War-era view of the Chain Bridge and Potomac River

Many of the 69th Pennsylvania's members had served in the 24th Pennsylvania, a three-month volunteer regiment. After departing for Washington, D.C., on September 17, the members of the regiment were ordered to the vicinity of the Chain Bridge, where they made camp on the south side of the Potomac River, and were assigned to the Army of the Potomac. While stationed here, the regiment was assigned to assist with the construction of Fort Ethan Allen and in the building of roads to improve Union Army access to the series of forts that had been erected to protect the Capitol building and the city of Washington.

It was also here, in October 1861, that the unit was first designated as the 2nd California and became part of Colonel Edwin Baker's California Brigade.

On September 24, the regiment served as part of the Union force commanded by General William Farrar Smith during reconnoissance activities at Lewinsville, which resulted in one member of the 69th being wounded during a brief fight with Confederate troops.

Ordered to Conrad's Ferry on October 20, members of the 69th then engaged in their first major combat experience during the Battle of Ball's Bluff the next day.

After this battle, its name was changed to the 68th Penna. for a short time and then the 69th. They made an attempt with the 69th New York to form an Irish Brigade, but Governor Andrew Gregg Curtin of Pennsylvania opposed the idea, which led to the proposal being dropped. The 68th had their regimental designation changed to the 69th in honor of the 69th New York Infantry.

=== 1862 ===
The 69th served in the Peninsula Campaign, during which it was complimented by Maj. Gen. Joseph Hooker for making “the first successful bayonet charge of the war.” On June 30, the 69th Pennsylvania found itself in the heat of battle when Confederate troops attacked the rear of the combined Union forces "on the heights east of the White Oak Swamp." Sustaining only minor casualties, the regiment ultimately helped to drive off the enemy.

Its next major action was at the Battle of Antietam, where it lost eighty-eight in killed, wounded or missing in action. Following the battle, O'Kane was recommissioned as a colonel and awarded command of the 69th Pennsylvania.

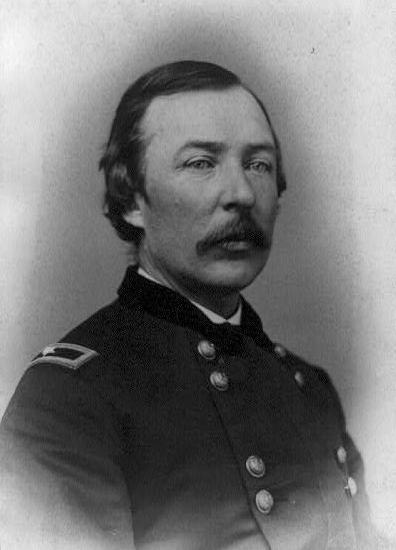
General Joshua T. Owen, U.S. Army, former commanding officer of the 69th Pennsylvania Infantry, shown circa 1863

On November 4, 1862, Harrisburg's Pennsylvania Telegraph carried the front-page news that court martial proceedings overseen by Brigadier General W. S. Hancock had found the 69th Pennsylvania's commanding officer, Colonel Owen, "guilty of charge of 'conduct prejudicial to good order and military discipline, and unbecoming an officer and a gentleman.'" The sentence directed the Owen be "dismissed from the service of the United States." The court martial hearing, which had been convened on October 7, 1862 was held at Harper's Ferry, Virginia. The charges against Owen and subsequent ruling of dismissal were outlined as follows in General Orders No. 168, issued from the Headquarters of the Army of the Potomac on October 24:

"Charge 1st. 'Violation of the 50th article of war.'

Specification. 'In this—Col. J. T. Owen, 69th Pennsylvania volunteers, at or near Bolivar Heights, Virginia, on or about the 4th of October, 1862, left his regiment, which had been detailed for the picket guard, so that the regiment proceeded to its post and performed its tour of duty without him.'

Charge 2d. 'Conduct prejudicial to good order and military discipline.'

Speciification. 'In this—that Col. J. T. Owen, 69th Pennsylvania volunteers, was much under the influence of liquor on or about the afternoon or evening of the 4th of October 1862, at or near Harper's Ferry, Virginia, and very abusive of his Lieutenant Colonel O'Kane, cursing and calling him names.'

Charge 3d. 'In this—that Col. J. T. Owen, 69th Pennsylvania volunteers, did call his Lieutenant Colonel, Dennis O'Kane, a 'son of a bitch,' in the presence of his daughter, Miss O'Kane; that he made improper and offensive requests of the young lady and her father; for example, insisting that the young lady should sleep in his tent. All this at or near Harper's Ferry, Virginia, on or about the 4th....'"

Owen was found guilty of the first and second charges and their specifications, but not guilty of the third. According to The Press of Philadelphia, although the court found Owen guilty and sentenced him to dismissal, court members then also recommended that Owen's sentencing be remitted and that he be returned to duty. Major General George B. McClellan agreed with both the court's verdict and sentencing, as well as its remittance of that sentence, noting:

"The finding and sentence of the court are fully supported by the testimony, and are approved by the major general commanding....

No comment of the general commanding can add any force to the above recital of the facts.

All the members of the court present at the finding and sentence recommend a remission of the sentence, 'in consideration of the previous good character of Col. Owen, and his distinguished services to the present war.' This recommendation is supported by testimony of the highest character, adduced upon the trial, showing that the accused has been a zealous and obedient officer, and has displayed great gallantry and good conduct on the field of battle.

The sentence of the court is remitted.

The general commanding trusts that the deep humiliation which the events themselves and the publicity of these proceedings must cause the accused will prevent the leniency here extended from producing any injurious influence in the service.

Colonel Joshua T. Owen, 69th Pennsylvania Volunteers, is released from arrest, and will return to duty."

In December 1862, the regiment sustained heavy casualties in the Battle of Fredericksburg, but then missed any major action at Chancellorsville, seeing only minor skirmishing.

=== 1863 ===
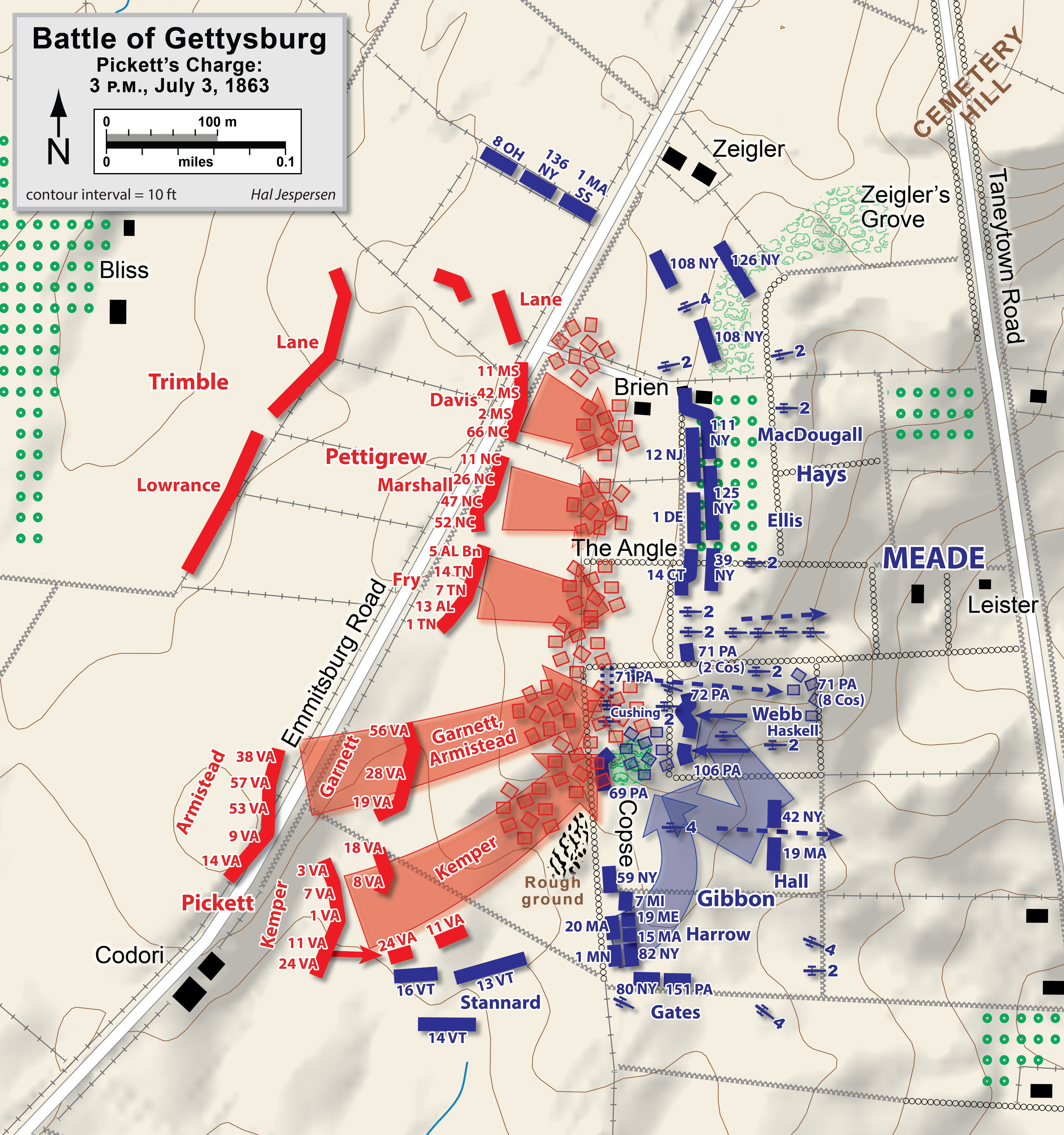
Hal Jespersen's map showing the 69th Pennsylvania's position during Pickett's Charge, Battle of Gettysburg, July 3, 1863

The unit played a critical role at the Battle of Gettysburg, helping repel both Brig. Gen. Ambrose Wright’s charge on July 2 and Pickett's Charge on July 3. Its casualties over the last two days of the battle were enormous, losing 143 men out of 268, including Colonel Dennis O'Kane, Lieutenant Colonel Martin Tschudy, two captains, and a lieutenant. The regiment's ranking officer, Major Duffy, was seriously wounded but refused to give up command until the battle was over. The 69th was the only regiment not to withdraw from defending the stone wall in front of the Copse of Trees during the charge. They were heavily engaged in hand to hand combat; while having been flanked on their right and left flanks as a result of the withdrawal of the two companies from the 71st Pennsylvania Infantry, on their right, and the 59th New York Infantry, on their left. Following the repulse of Pickett, there were numerous Confederate Battle Flags left lying on the field directly to the front of the 69th. The 69th was so devastated by casualties and busy tending to its own wounded while also sending Confederate prisoners to the rear that it failed to secure any. Instead members of regiments who came to assist the 69th with the repulse, during a later point of the assault, went to the 69th's front and claimed the flags as prizes. The 69th finished the campaign under the command of Captain William Davis of Co K.

=== 1864–1865 ===
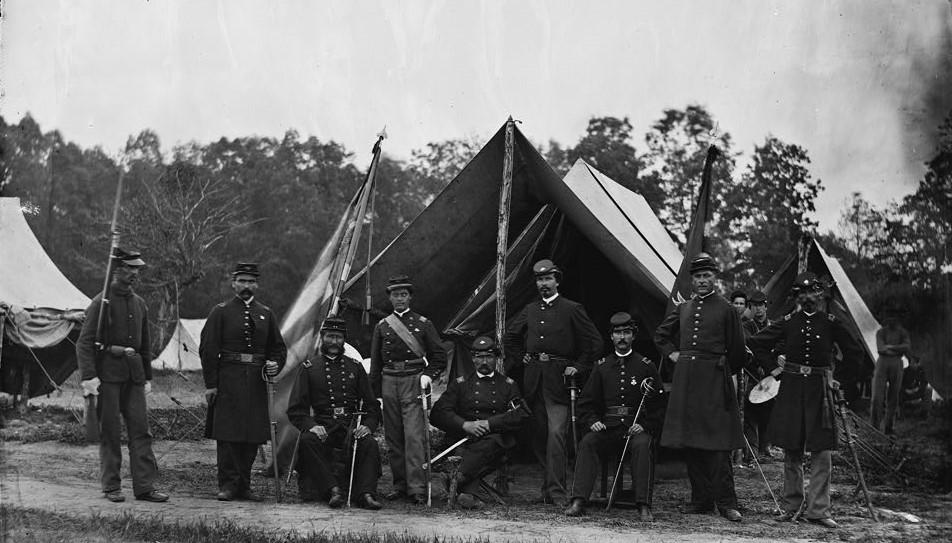
Field and staff officers, 69th Pennsylvania Volunteer Infantry, Gettysburg, Pennsylvania, June 1865

In January and February 1864, multiple members of the 69th Pennsylvania were transferred to the Invalid Corps by orders of the Adjutant General's Office.

The 69th fought in Grant’s Overland Campaign, again losing heavily. At the Battle of Spotsylvania Court House, Lieutenant Charles McAnally of Company D captured a Confederate battle flag. He was later awarded the Medal of Honor for this act, becoming the only soldier of the 69th so decorated.

After the Battle of Cold Harbor, the 71st Pennsylvania was merged into the 69th. During the Siege of Petersburg, the Philadelphia Brigade was broken up, with the 72nd Pennsylvania mustered out of service and the 106th reduced to a single battalion.

The 69th participated in the pursuit of the Army of Northern Virginia during the Appomattox Campaign, during which time it sustained multiple additional casualties.

After the war's end, the regiment participated in the Union's Grand Review of the Armies in Washington, D.C., in May 1865. The regiment was then officially mustered out at Ball’s Cross-Roads, near Washington, D.C., on July 1, 1865.

== Battle flags and uniforms ==
The 69th Pennsylvania Volunteers' first battle flag, the First State Color, was manufactured by Horstmann Brothers and Company, and was presented to the regiment sometime after November 1861. It was carried into battle until December 1863, when it was retired and replaced by the Second State Color, which was manufactured by Evans and Hassall. That second battle flag remained in use until the regiment was mustered out on July 1, 1865.

In addition, the 69th carried a green "Irish" flag into battle. According to The Philadelphia Inquirer, the 69th Pennsylvania's battle flag was "a beautiful specimen of art" that did "credit to the taste of donors." One side "represented the coat of arms of ancient Ireland"; the other featured the coat of arms of the Commonwealth of Pennsylvania. Initially presented to the regiment while it was stationed at Berryville, Virginia in early 1862, which was replaced with a new green flag in March 1864 when members of the regiment re-enlisted with the 69th Pennsylvania for additional tours of duty.

Companies I and K, designated as the regiment's skirmisher companies, wore a very Americanized Zouave uniform. This uniform consisted of a dark blue Zouave jacket with green trimming, green cuffs, and sixteen brass buttons down the front on both sides of the jacket, a sky blue Zouave vest, chasseur sky-blue trousers, and a dark blue kepi. This was one of the few Zouave uniforms that did not use red as the jacket trimming. However, the Zouave uniforms were mostly destroyed during the Peninsula Campaign and were not replaced.

== Casualty rates and burial locations ==
Of the original one thousand men mustered into service at the formation of the regiment, only fifty-six "returned whole at the end," according to regimental historian Donald Ernsberger. Over 50 veterans of the 69th Pennsylvania were buried in Cathedral Cemetery in West Philadelphia, many in unmarked graves because their families were too poor to afford headstones. On Veterans Day in 2002, a memorial to the members of the regiment was installed in Cathedral Cemetery by an American Civil War reenactment group from Bucks County, Pennsylvania.

According to historians at the U.S. National Park Service, the regiment sustained a total of 288 casualties during its tenure of service. Twelve officers and 166 enlisted men were mortally wounded or killed in action. Three officers and 107 enlisted men died from disease.

== Survivors' Association of the Sixty-Ninth Pennsylvania Regiment ==
Post-war, veterans of the 69th Pennsylvania established the Survivors' Association of the Sixty-Ninth Pennsylvania Regiment. Officers of the organization were elected annually, and participated in organizing annual reunions.

== Reenactors ==
The 69th Pennsylvania Irish Volunteers, schools, and other living history groups portray the regiment at various reenactments each year.

== See also ==
- List of Pennsylvania Civil War Units
