= Joshua T. Owen =

Union Army brigadier general and Pennsylvania state representative (1821-1887)

Joshua Thomas Owen
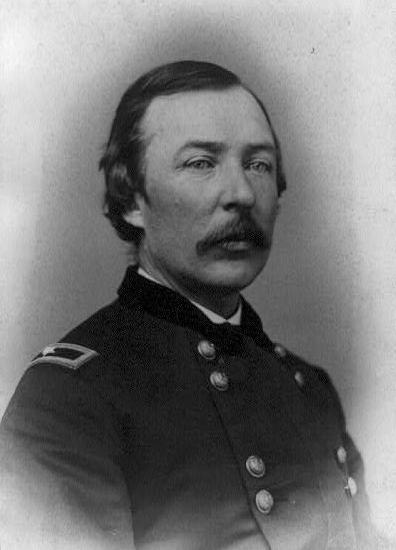
- Born: March 29, 1821; Carmarthen, Wales, United Kingdom
- Died: November 7, 1887 (aged 66); Philadelphia, Pennsylvania, U.S.
- Burial place: Laurel Hill Cemetery, Philadelphia, Pennsylvania, U.S.
- Military career
- Allegiance: United States of America
- Branch: United States Army; Union Army
- Service years: 1861–1864
- Rank: Brigadier General
- Nickname: Paddy
- Commands: 24th Pennsylvania Infantry Regiment; 69th Pennsylvania Volunteer Infantry Regiment; Philadelphia Brigade
- Conflicts: American Civil War; Battle of Ball's Bluff; Peninsula Campaign; Battle of Glendale; Battle of Antietam; Battle of Fredericksburg; Battle of Chancellorsville; Battle of the Wilderness; Battle of Spotsylvania Court House; Battle of Cold Harbor

Joshua Thomas Owen (March 29, 1821 – November 7, 1887) was a British-born American military officer who served as a Union Army brigadier general during the American Civil War. He commanded the Philadelphia Brigade for part of the war.

He had an ongoing feud with his commanding officer, general John Gibbon which resulted in an revoked court-martial in 1863 and an arrest for disobedience of orders during battle in 1864. Owen was scheduled to be court-martialed, but Ulysses S. Grant interceded in the case and Owen was honorably discharged from service instead.

He served as a Democratic member of the Pennsylvania House of Representatives in 1858 and was founder and editor of the New York Daily Register, a newspaper and law journal, from 1871 to 1887.

== Early life and career ==
Owen was born in Carmarthen, Wales, on March 29, 1821. He emigrated with his family to the United States. He graduated from Jefferson College in Canonsburg, Pennsylvania in 1845. He worked as a professor at the Chestnut Hill Academy in Philadelphia and practiced law. He served as a Democratic member of the Pennsylvania House of Representative in 1858.

== Civil War ==
Owen entered the Civil War on May 8, 1861, as colonel of the 24th Pennsylvania Infantry Regiment. The unit served only three months and fought in the Battle of Ball's Bluff. After the discharge of the 24th Pennsylvania Infantry, he took command as colonel of the 69th Pennsylvania Infantry, a predominantly Irish regiment that was part of the Philadelphia Brigade.

Owen and the 69th fought with distinction at Battle of Glendale and he was commended by generals Joseph Hooker and John Sedgwick and recommended for promotion to brigadier general.

He led the Philadelphia brigade at the Battle of Chancellorsville, where it performed barely any service.

He was reported killed in action twice by two different newspapers during the Battle of Spotsylvania Court House. He lost a finger in battle and had two horses shot from under him.

Owen was court-martialed and relieved of brigade command for unclear reasons. Some accounts placed the reason for poor discipline in his troops and others for assaulting his lieutenant colonel while drunk. His sentence was revoked due to his previous good character and service. He was replaced by Alexander S. Webb, who led the brigade admirably at the Battle of Gettysburg.

Owen returned to his brigade after Gettysburg and led it at the Wilderness, Spotsylvania, and Cold Harbor. On May 15, Owen requested to be transferred or mustered out of service due to ongoing disagreements with his commanding officer, general John Gibbon. He was arrested on May 18, 1864, under order of Gibbon, for disobedience of orders in the face of the enemy at Cold Harbor and Spotsylvania. Owen was ordered to assault the enemy to the right of another brigade. He encountered unexpected swampland and altered his course to prevent his troops from becoming trapped and emerged to the left of the other brigade. Gibbon pressed charges against Owen for this perceived disobedience. He was scheduled to be court-martialed at Fort Monroe, however Ulysses S. Grant intervened with a telegram to secretary of war Edwin Stanton and Owen was instead honorably discharged from service on July 16, 1864.

== Post war career ==
After the war, Owen returned to Pennsylvania. He was elected recorder of deeds for Philadelphia County and served from 1867 to 1870. He was the founder and editor of the New York Daily Register, a newspaper and law journal, from 1871 to 1887. He died in Philadelphia on November 7, 1887, and was interred in Laurel Hill Cemetery.

== See also ==
- List of American Civil War generals (Union)

== Sources ==
- U.S. War Department, The War of the Rebellion: a Compilation of the Official Records of the Union and Confederate Armies, U.S. Government Printing Office, 1880–1901.
