= Battle of Ball's Bluff order of battle: Confederate =

The following Confederate States Army units and commanders fought in the Battle of Ball's Bluff of the American Civil War, fought from October 20 to October 24, 1861 in Loudoun County, Virginia, also known as the Battle of Leesburg or the Battle of Harrison's Island. The Union order of battle is shown separately.

== Abbreviations used ==
=== Military rank ===
- GEN = General
- LG = Lieutenant General
- MG = Major General
- BG = Brigadier General
- Col = Colonel
- Ltc = Lieutenant Colonel
- Maj = Major
- Cpt = Captain
- Lt = Lieutenant
- Bvt = Brevet Rank

=== Other ===
- w = wounded
- mw = mortally wounded
- k = killed

== Confederate Forces Around Ball's Bluff and Edwards' Ferry ==
Col Nathan "Shanks" Evans

=== Army of the Potomac ===
GEN Joseph E. Johnston (not present)

Brigade	Regiments and Others
Seventh Brigade; Col Nathan Evans	8th Virginia Infantry: Col Eppa Hunton; 13th Mississippi Infantry: Col William Barksdale; 17th Mississippi Infantry: Col Winfield Scott Featherston; 18th Mississippi Infantry: Col. Erasmus Burt (mw)
Cavalry Ltc Walter Jenifer	Chesterfield Light Dragoons (company strength): Cpt William B. Ball; Loudoun Cavalry (company strength): Cpt William W. Mead; Madison Invincibles (company strength): Cpt William Thomas; Powhattan Troop (company strength): Cpt John F. Lay; Wise Dragoons (company strength): Lt James Morehead
Artillery	Richmond Howitzers, 1st Co.: Cpt John C. Shields
