= James Henry Van Alen =

Union Army general (1819–1886)

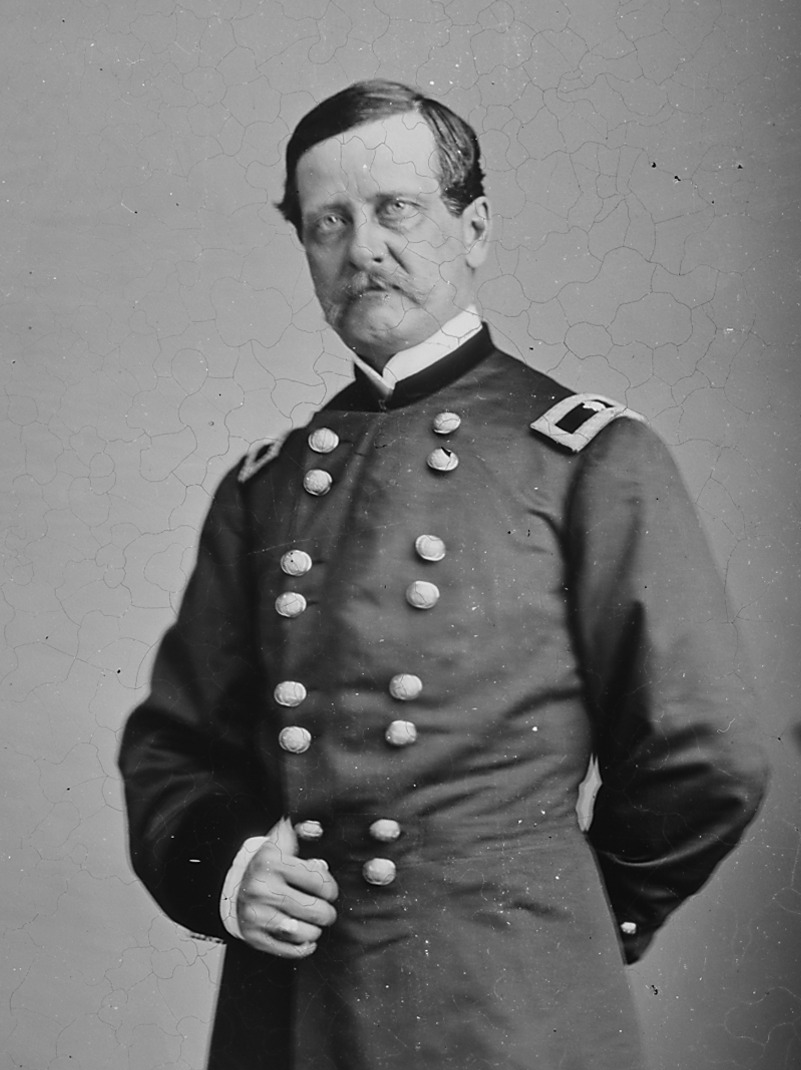
- Born: August 17, 1819; Kinderhook, New York, U.S.
- Died: July 22, 1886 (aged 66); At sea between Liverpool and New York
- Relatives: James John Van Alen (son)
- Military career
- Allegiance: United States of America; Union
- Branch: United States Army; Union Army
- Service years: 1861–1863
- Rank: Brigadier General
- Commands: 3rd New York Volunteer Cavalry
- Conflicts: American Civil War
- Other work: Merchant, soldier, politician

James Henry Van Alen (August 17, 1819 – July 22, 1886) was a brigadier general in the Union Army during the American Civil War.

== Early life ==
James Henry Van Alen was born in 1819, in Kinderhook, New York. He was the only son of James I. Van Alen (1788–1874), (Note: His father, James I. or T. Van Alen, is sometimes mistakenly referred to as U.S. Representative James Isaac Van Alen (1772–1822), the half-brother of U.S. President Martin Van Buren, who did not marry nor have children.) an affluent merchant, and Lucy (née Trumbull) Van Alen (1788–1867) of the Connecticut Trumbulls. His sister Sophie Van Alen (d. 1916) was married to Robert Minturn Grinnell (1829–1898), the son of merchant Henry Grinnell.

His education was through private tutors and he never devoted himself to business besides managing his wealth. He owned considerable real estate, which he left to his son upon his death in 1886.

== Career ==
At the beginning of the Civil War, Van Alen recruited and equipped the 3rd New York Cavalry Regiment. He became the unit's colonel on August 28, 1861, when the unit was stationed in defending Washington, D.C.

Van Alen was promoted to brigadier general on April 15, 1862. During the Battle of Chancellorsville, Van Alen served as the aide-de-camp of General Joseph Hooker. Later he was assigned to Aquia Creek in Virginia. After a twenty-day sick leave for disabling fevers, he resigned on July 14, 1863. After the war, he traveled frequently and became a member of the Military Order of the Loyal Legion of the United States.

After the presidential election of 1876, President Ulysses S. Grant appointed Van Alen, a Republican, as one of the visiting statesmen to Louisiana. Upon his return to New York, Van Alen gave a well known address on January 3, 1877 entitled "The Vote of Louisiana" before the Republican Reform Club in which he detailed fraud and intimidation of black voters on the part of Democrats in Louisiana.

== Personal life ==
Van Alen was married to Mary Young Steward (1818–1852), the daughter of John Steward and Martha Jackson Steward. The Van Alens had a home in Newport, Rhode Island called " The Grange " where James lived year-round. Together, they were the parents of one surviving child, a son:

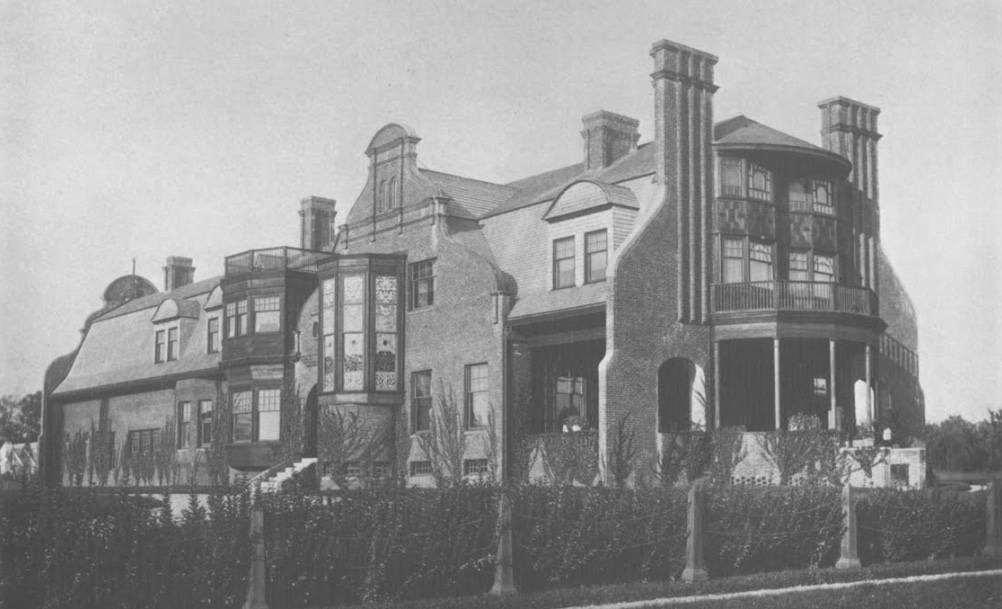
The Grange (built 1882–83, razed 1888) designed by the architect Clarence Sumner Luce (1852-1924)

- James John Van Alen (1848–1923), a sportsman and politician who married Emily Astor (1854–1881), the eldest daughter of William Backhouse Astor, Jr. and Caroline Schermerhorn Astor.

On a voyage returning from England with three grandchildren, Van Alen either jumped or fell off the RMS Umbria on July 22, 1886; his body was not recovered. The New York Times reported after his death that "The sad, mysterious death of Gen. James H. Van Alen has cast a gloom over the place [Newport]. The New-York papers were eagerly read for the latest news regarding the affair, which was the sole topic of discussion in society and by the local residents, who knew and respected the deceased."

=== Estate and descendants ===
In his will dated September 13, 1884, his left $300,000 and The Grange, his Newport estate, and other properties to his son. The residue was left in trust to be divided in three parts: two parts of $250,000, at least, for the benefit of his granddaughters Mary and Sarah, and the third and residue for his grandson, James Laurens Van Alen.

Through his son James, he was the grandfather of Mary Van Alen (1876–1959), who married Griswold A. Thompson (1875–1945) in 1913; James Laurens Van Alen (1878–1927), who married Margaret Louise Post (1876–1969) in 1900; and Sarah Steward Van Alen (1881–1963), who married Robert Joseph Collier (1876–1918) in 1902.

Through his grandson James Laurens, Van Alen was the great-grandfather of socialite and tennis enthusiast James Henry Van Alen IV (1902–1991).

== See also ==
- List of people who disappeared mysteriously at sea
