= Philadelphia Brigade =

Union Army infantry brigade

- Active: September 1861 - July 1865
- Country: United States of America
- Branch: United States Army; Union Army
- Type: infantry
- Size: Four regiments
- Engagements: American Civil War: Peninsula Campaign; Battle of Fredericksburg; Battle of Chancellorsville; Battle of Gettysburg; Overland Campaign; Siege of Petersburg; Battle of Appomattox Court House

Commanders
- Notable commanders: Brig. Gen. Oliver O. Howard; Brig. Gen. Joshua T. Owen; Brig. Gen. Alexander S. Webb; Brig. Gen. William W. Burns

The Philadelphia Brigade (also known as the California Brigade) was a Union Army brigade that served in the American Civil War. It was raised primarily in the city of Philadelphia, Pennsylvania, with the exception of the 106th regiment which contained men from Lycoming and Bradford counties.

The brigade fought with the Army of the Potomac in the Eastern Theater for the entirety of its existence and fought in several major battles, including the battles of Antietam, Fredericksburg, Gettysburg, and the Overland Campaign. One of its most famous actions was during Pickett's Charge on July 3 at the Battle of Gettysburg, where it defended the Angle on Cemetery Ridge. Half of the brigade was mustered out in June 1864 and the remainder was transferred to another brigade.

== History ==
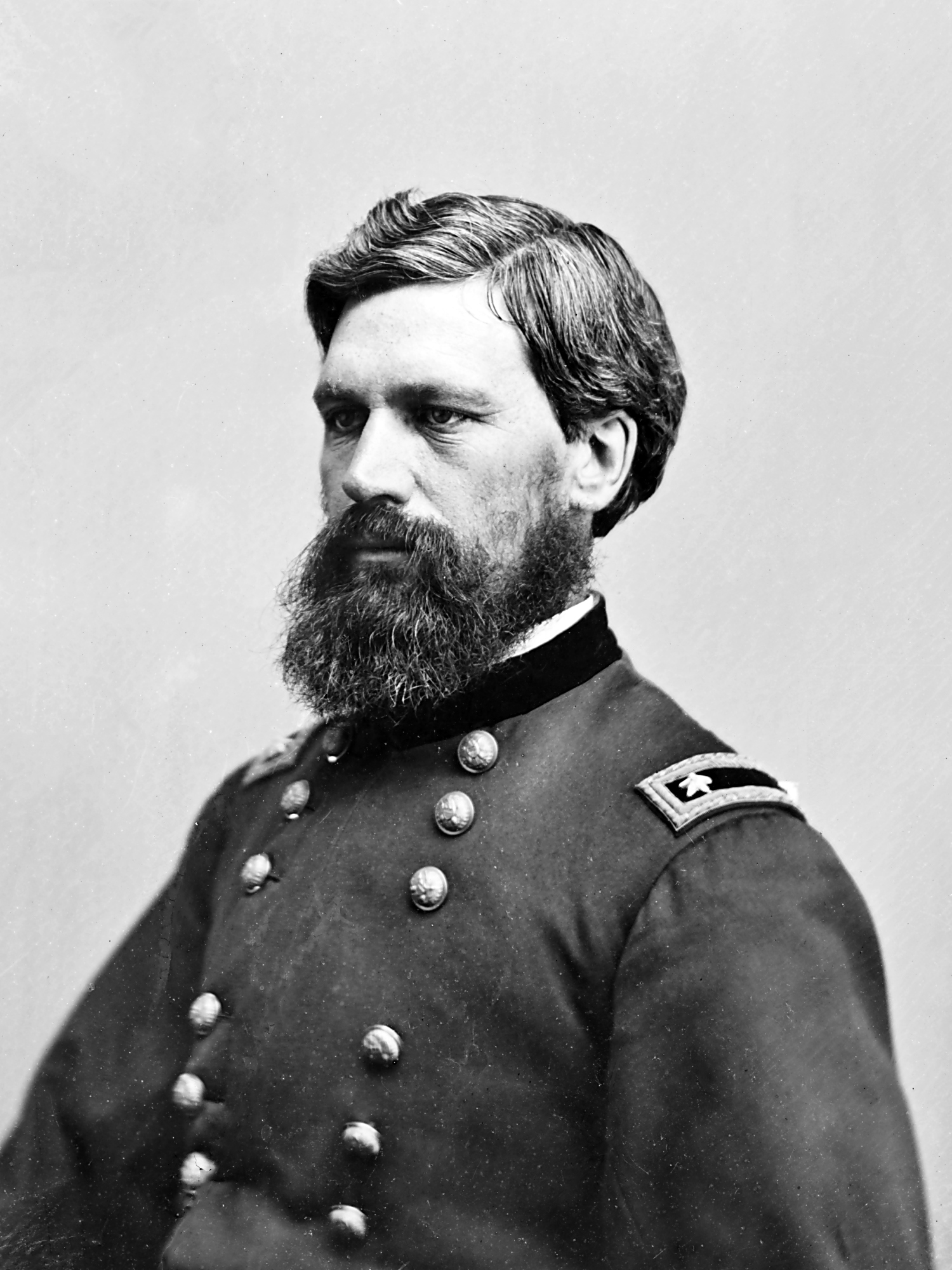
Oliver O. Howard commanded the Philadelphia Brigade during the Battle of Antietam

The regiments in the Philadelphia Brigade were originally designated as California regiments. Some residents on the West Coast wanted California to have a military presence in the Eastern army and asked Oregon Senator Edward D. Baker to form a regiment to be credited to that state. Baker was able to recruit a regiment from Philadelphia, designated the 1st California. By October, he increased his command to a brigade, adding the 2nd, 3rd, and 5th California regiments, all of which were from Philadelphia. After his death at the Battle of Ball's Bluff, Pennsylvania claimed the regiments as its own and renamed them as the following:

- the 1st California became the 71st regiment;
- the 2nd California became the 69th regiment;
- the 3rd California became the 72nd regiment;
- the 5th California became the 106th regiment.

Now commanded by Brig. Gen. William W. Burns, it was then assigned to the Army of the Potomac's II Corps as the 2nd Brigade, 2nd Division. It fought in the Peninsula Campaign, during which the 69th was credited by Maj. Gen. Joseph Hooker with making "the first successful bayonet charge of the war" at the Battle of Glendale. It also fought during the Seven Days battles, including Allen's Farm and Savage Station; at Malvern Hill it was posted on the Union right with the rest of the II Corps and consequently wasn't engaged during the battle.

At the Battle of Antietam, the brigade, now commanded by Brig. Gen. Oliver O. Howard, was part of Maj. Gen. John Sedgwick's attack near the West Woods. The division ran into stiff resistance and was then attacked in the flank. Most of the division was routed, including the Philadelphia Brigade; some companies had no time to return fire before being caught up in the rout. The brigade lost 545 men in as little as ten minutes. When Sedgwick was wounded during the battle, Howard took command of his division and Colonel Joshua T. Owen of the 69th regiment took command of the brigade. In the Battle of Fredericksburg the following December, the brigade participated in the assault on Marye's Heights. The 71st regiment was assigned provost duty in the city, so Howard transferred the 127th Pennsylvania to the brigade to replace it. The Philadelphia Brigade made it part way up the slope of the ridge but the rest of division failed to advance at the same time; both this and Confederate fire halted its advance. During the battle, the brigade lost 258 men, with the 127th Pennsylvania suffering 146 casualties. During the Battle of Chancellorsville in May 1863, Brig. Gen. John Gibbon's division (of which the brigade was a part) initially remained in their winter camps to act "as a decoy while the rest of the army marched." On May 3, the division supported Major General John Sedgwick's attack on the Confederate rearguard at Fredericksburg and remained in the city afterwards to guard the city and the bridges across the river.

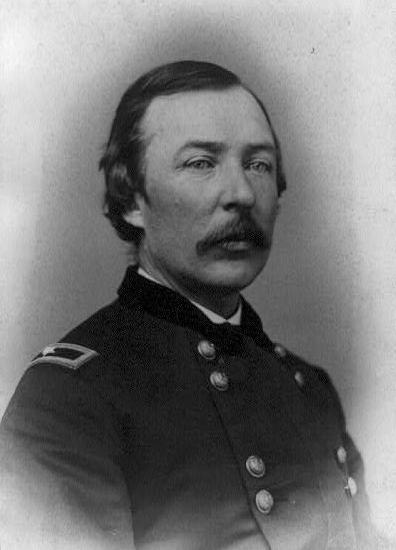
Joshua T. Owen, who commanded the brigade for the greater part of the war

Just before the Battle of Gettysburg, Brig. Gen. Joshua T. Owen was relieved of command and replaced by Brig. Gen. Alexander S. Webb, in the hopes of improving the discipline of the brigade. During the battle, it defended Cemetery Ridge near the famous Angle on July 2 and July 3, 1863. On the evening of July 2, it helped drive Brig. Gen. Ambrose R. Wright's brigade back after it captured a portion of the ridge and recaptured a cannon. The 106th advanced as far as the Codori Barn near the Emmitsburg Road and the 72nd advanced just over the stone wall, before both regiments withdrew to their previous positions.

On July 3, eight companies of the 106th were sent to Cemetery Hill (the other two were deployed along the Emmitsburg Road as pickets); the 71st was briefly sent to Culp's Hill but was later moved back to the Angle. Half of the regiment was posted at the portion of the wall closest to the Confederates while the other half was 50 yards to its right-rear. The 69th manned the wall to the left of the 71st. The 72nd was posted in reserve behind the copse of trees. Two companies of the 106th returned to the Angle and placed in reserve with the 72nd (the remainder of the regiment stayed on Cemetery Hill). During Pickett's Charge, the left wing of the 71st retreated from the stone wall, allowing the Confederates to pour over. The 69th refused its right to protect its flank; however, the 59th New York, on its left also retreated and due largely to the overwhelming Confederate numbers, the 69th held its position despite being flanked on both ends and being engaged in hand to hand combat. Company F was accidentally left isolated due to not hearing the order to refuse the flank and was engulfed by the attacking Confederates.

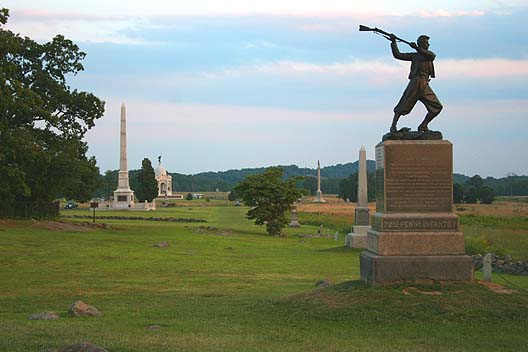
The 72nd Pennsylvania Infantry Monument on Cemetery Ridge, Gettysburg, Pennsylvania

The 72nd and the two remaining companies of the 106th behind the copse refused to counterattack. Webb was able to rally the 71st and move it in line with these two units; when he attempted to get these units to advance to retake the wall but the regiments refused to move. After other Union regiments joined in the counterattack on Pickett's Division, Webb was able to get his brigade to charge as well; although he was wounded in the groin, Webb refused to leave the field. The brigade was able to capture four battle flags (of the 3rd, 9th, 53rd, and 56th Virginia Infantry).

After Gettysburg, the brigade continued to serve in the Army of the Potomac, from the Overland Campaign to the surrender at Appomattox Court House, often losing heavily. Owen was restored to command of the Philadelphia Brigade (Webb was transferred to command of a different brigade) and the 152nd New York Infantry was added to the brigade. Owen's superiors continued to complain about his performance as a commander; at Spotsylvania Court House, his brigade was ordered to make a reconnaissance in force against the Confederate lines but Owen was absent for unexplained reasons, forcing another brigade commander to take over. The brigade last fought as a unit at the Battle of Cold Harbor, where Owen both failed to have his brigade ready for the June 3rd assault on time and also failed to participate in the attack as his division commander intended. As a result, for this incident and for the attack at Spotsylvania, Owen was relieved of command and mustered out of service. On July 22, 1864, the brigade was broken up. The majority of the 71st and 106th and the entire 72nd were discharged. The remaining men of the 71st were merged into the 69th and the 106th reformed as a four-company battalion.

During the war, the brigade lost 3,533 men out of a total 5,320 men who served in the unit, a casualty rate of 64%.

== Commanders ==
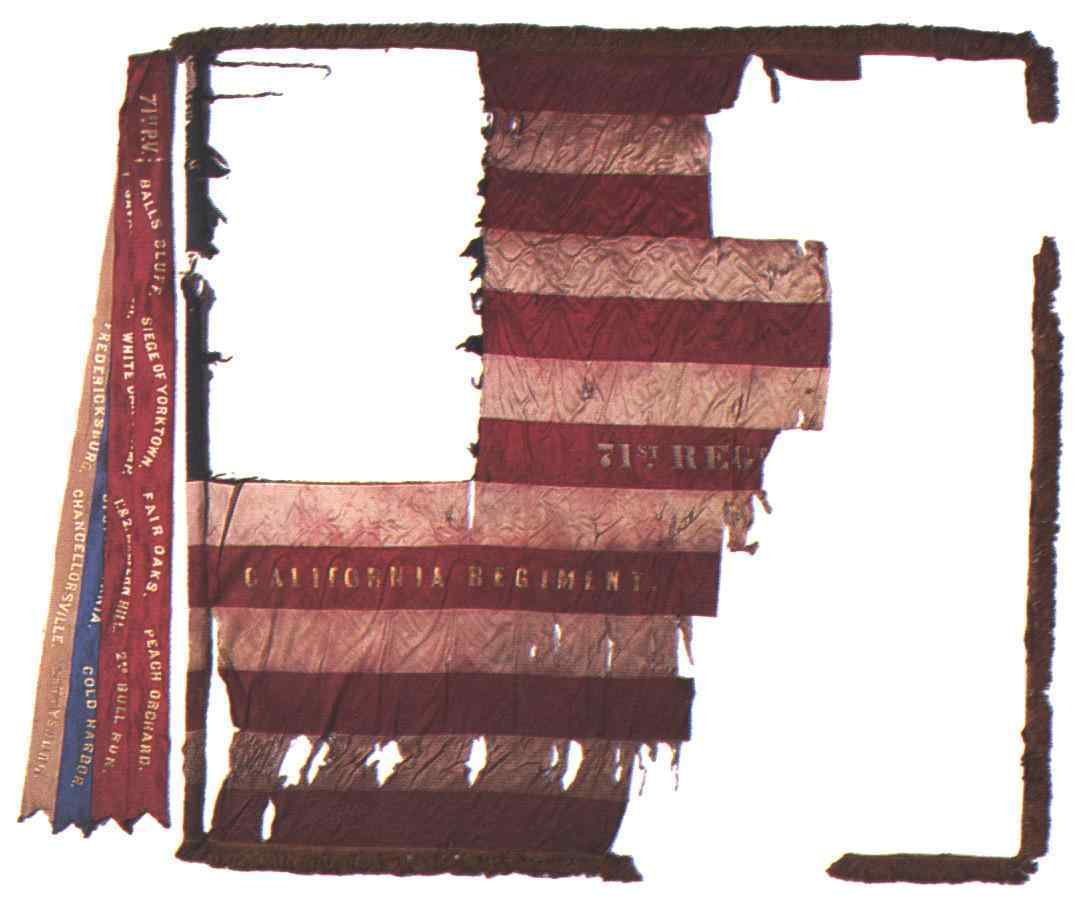
71st Penn

- Colonel Edward D. Baker — to October 21, 1861
- Brigadier General William W. Burns — October 1861 - August 1862
- Brigadier General Oliver O. Howard — August 1862 - September 1862
- Brigadier General Joshua T. Owen — September 1862 - June 1863
- Brigadier General Alexander S. Webb — June - July 1863
- Brigadier General Joshua T. Owen — August 1863 - June 1864

== Bibliography ==
- Lash, Gary. "The California Brigade". California and the Civil War. California State Military Museum.
- "Gettysburg Discussion Group history".
- "Pennsylvania in the Civil War".
- Burton, Brian K. (2001). Extraordinary Circumstances: The Seven Days Battles. Indiana University Press. ISBN 0-253-33963-4.
- O'Reilly, Francis Augustin (2006). The Fredericksburg Campaign: Winter War on the Rappahannock. Louisiana State University Press. ISBN 0-8071-2809-0.
- Pfanz, Harry W. (1987). Gettysburg: The Second Day. Chapel Hill, North Carolina: The University of North Carolina Press. ISBN 0-8078-1749-X.
- Rhea, Gordon C. (2002). Cold Harbor: Grant and Lee May 26 - June 3, 1864. Louisiana State University Press. ISBN 0-8071-2803-1.
- Rhea, Gordon C. (2000). To the North Anna River: Grant and Lee May 13 - 25, 1864. Louisiana State University Press. ISBN 0-8071-2535-0.
- Sears, Stephen W. (1996). Chancellorsville. New York City: Houghton Mifflin Company. ISBN 0-395-63417-2.
- Sears, Stephen W. (1983). Landscape Turned Red: The Battle of Antietam. Popular Library. ISBN 978-0618344192.
- Wert, Jeffry D. (2001). Gettysburg: Day Three. Simon & Schuster. ISBN 0-684-85914-9.
- "Reenactors of the 71st Pennsylvania".
