= 2nd United States Colored Cavalry Regiment =

- Active: 1863–1866
- Country: United States
- Allegiance: United States Union
- Branch: Cavalry; United States Colored Troops
- Size: Regiment
- Engagements: American Civil War: Bermuda Hundred campaign; Siege of Petersburg

The 2nd United States Colored Cavalry Regiment was an African-American military unit that served in the Union Army during the American Civil War. The 2nd Colored Cavalry fought in Virginia before being mustered out of service in 1866.

== History ==
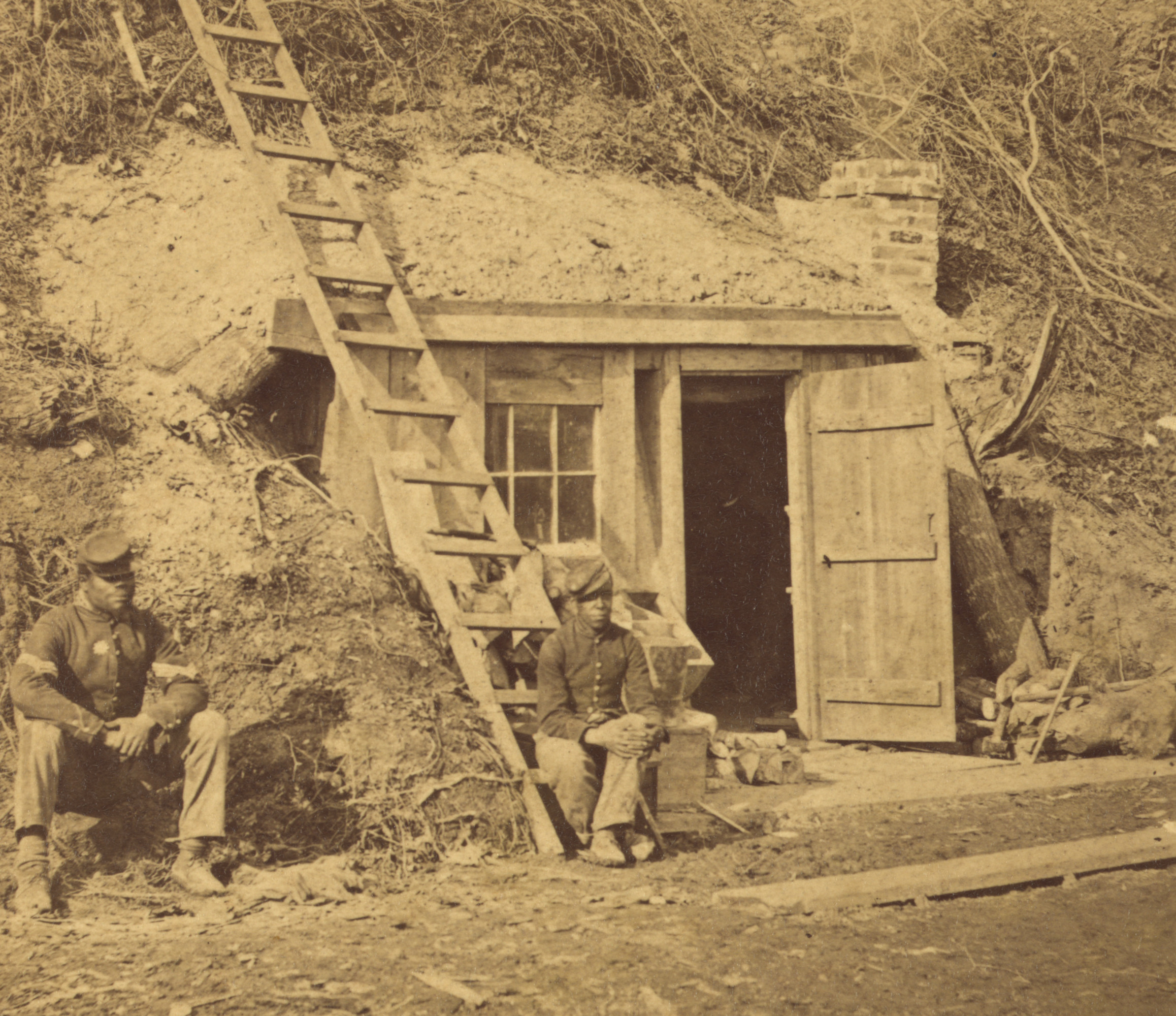
Two soldiers of the 2nd Colored Cavalry, Dutch Gap, Virginia.

The 2nd Colored Cavalry Regiment was organized at Fort Monroe, Virginia on December 22, 1863. Fort Monroe was an important Union stronghold on the Virginia coast that became a place of refuge for escaped slaves once the war began. The US Bureau of Colored Troops was formed in May, 1863 and began enlisting Black men into military units. Initially the Colored Troops were assigned to manual labor and support duties, but later they took part in combat actions. All of the officers of the US Colored Troops were white, Black soldiers would not be commissioned as officers until after the Civil War. The commanding officer of the 2nd Colored Cavalry was Colonel George W. Cole, a veteran officer from New York state.

The 2nd Cavalry was assigned to garrison and guard duties at Fort Monroe until the spring of 1864. The first battle of the Regiment took place on March 9, 1864, near Suffolk, Virginia. A Union patrol from the 2nd Cavalry encountered several regiments of Confederates from North Carolina, and a battle began. Several soldiers of the 2nd Colored Cavalry took cover in a house that the Confederates set on fire, burning the men to death. Although they were greatly outnumbered, the Union troops were able to fight off the Confederates, suffering 8 killed in the battle. A Union officer reporting on the actions of the 2nd Colored Cavalry at Suffolk wrote that "Never did soldiers display more bravery".

In May 1864, the 2nd Cavalry took part in General Benjamin Butler's Bermuda Hundred campaign on the south bank of the James River. Union forces fought the Confederates at Drewry's Bluff and Fort Darling as they tried to capture strategic points between Richmond and Petersburg. Butler's attempt to capture Drewry's Bluff was unsuccessful, the 2nd Cavalry lost 3 men in battles there.

The 2nd Cavalry, as dismounted infantry, took part in the Siege of Petersburg that began in the summer of 1864, fighting in various actions along the defensive lines. 2 men were killed in a skirmish at Point of Rocks on May 23. The regiment fought battles at Deep Bottom in July, New Market Heights in September, and Fair Oaks & Darbytown Road in October. The regiment lost 5 killed and 6 missing in these battles.

The 2nd Cavalry remained in Northern Virginia along the Petersburg-Richmond line until the Confederate capital was captured in the spring of 1865. In June, the regiment was sent by boat to Brownsville, Texas to guard the US-Mexican border. South of the border, Mexican Republican forces had been fighting against the French-backed Mexican Empire since 1861. As the American Civil War ended, the US was able to focus more attention on supporting Mexican President Benito Juárez's republican forces. Troops from the 2nd Cavalry briefly occupied the Mexican town of Bagdad on the south bank of the Rio Grande in January 1866 to support Mexican troops there. The regiment was then mustered out of service on February 12, 1866.

== See also ==
- List of United States Colored Troops Civil War Units
- United States Colored Troops
