= Jimmy Van Alen =

American tennis official and player (1902–1991)

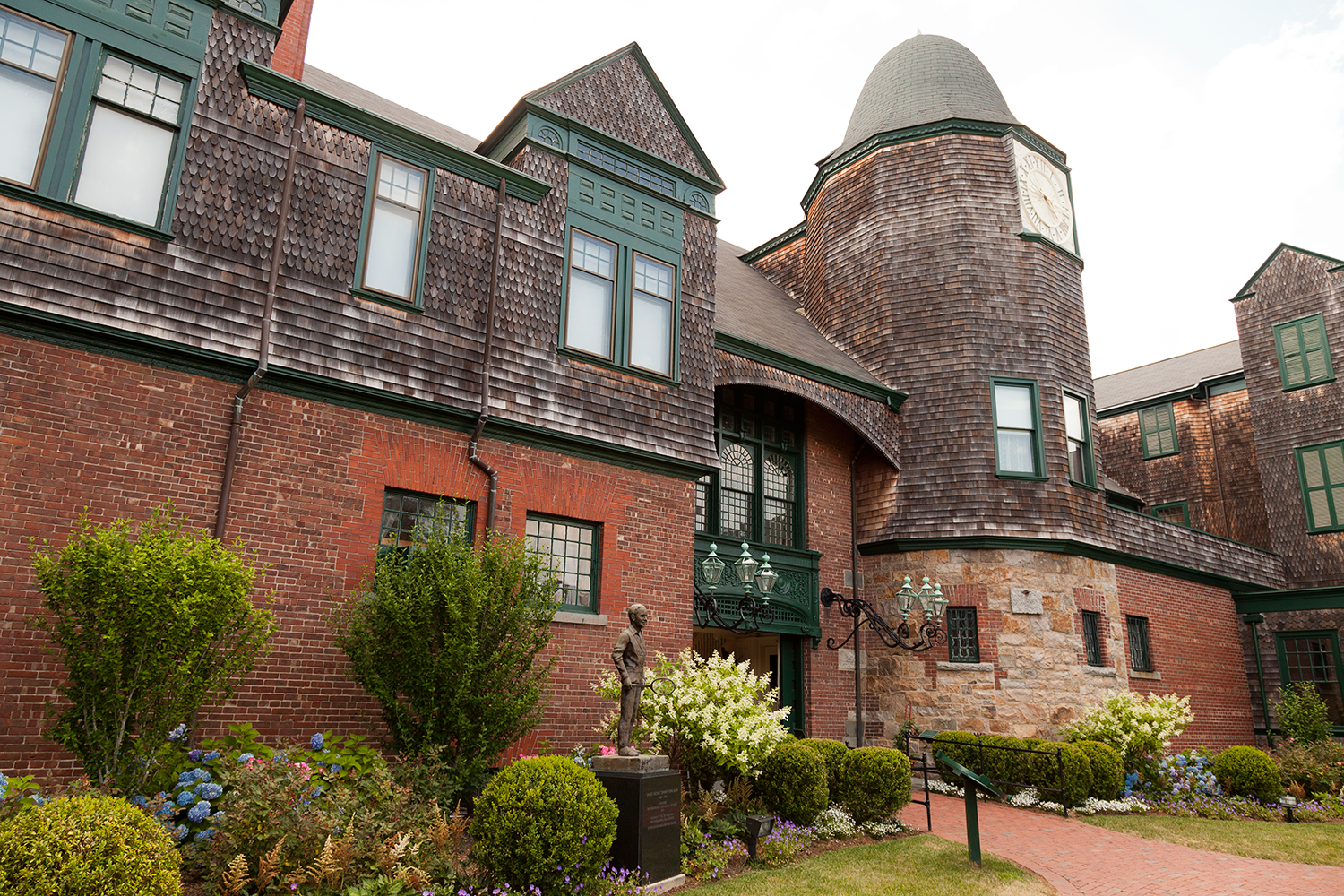
- Statue of James Van Alen in the International Tennis Hall of Fame courtyard
- Full name: James Henry Van Alen II
- Country (sports): United States
- Born: 19 September 1902 Newport, Rhode Island, US
- Died: 3 July 1991 (aged 88) Newport, Rhode Island, US
- Plays: Right-handed (one-handed backhand)
- Int. Tennis HoF: 1965 (member page)

Singles

Grand Slam singles results
- French Open: 2R (1927)
- Wimbledon: 1R (1922, 1924, 1925)
- US Open: 2R (1931)

James Henry Van Alen II (September 19, 1902 – July 3, 1991) was an American tennis official and former player. Van Alen was a poet, musician, publisher, civic leader, and raconteur. He was best known for his influence of tennis, especially for the tiebreak and for being the founder and primary benefactor of the International Tennis Hall of Fame at the Newport Casino, the largest tennis museum in the world, which he gave to the United States Tennis Association in 1954, saving the national landmark from a proposed car park.

== Biography ==
Van Alen was born on September 19, 1902, in Newport, Rhode Island, United States, to James Laurens Van Alen (1878–1927) and Margaret Louise Post (1876–1969). His paternal grandparents were James John Van Alen (1848–1923) and Emily Astor (1854–1881) of the Astor family.

He graduated in 1924 from Christ's College, Cambridge and won his blue for Lawn Tennis. He was a member of the Hawks' Club in Cambridge where the main lounge is named the 'Jimmy Van Alen Room'. He was an avid tennis player and was a national singles and doubles champion in court tennis.

He helped found the International Tennis Hall of Fame in 1954 at the Newport Casino in Newport, Rhode Island. One of his contributions to the game was the development of the Van Alen Streamlined Scoring System (VASSS) which, among other elements, advocated a sudden-death tie breaker to end prolonged sets and matches. Van Alen actively promoted his system and in 1970 the U.S Open became the first Grand Slam tournament to introduce, on an experimental basis, the tie-break. Initially it was a best-of-nine-points, sudden death tie-break which made it possible to have simultaneous match points for both players. Via a few intermediary steps this would evolve into the current best-of-twelve-point tie-break.

He was inducted into the International Tennis Hall of Fame in 1965.

In 1948, he married Candace Baird Alig.

He was a great fan of Clement C. Moore's famous poem A Visit from Saint Nicholas which is more commonly known as Twas the Night Before Christmas. He purchased and restored the Clement C. Moore house on Catherine Street in Newport, RI and would make an annual public reading of the poem to children during the Christmas season.

He died after falling off a terrace at his home and striking his head on July 3, 1991. He is buried with his wife at the Berkeley Memorial Cemetery at Saint Columba's Chapel in Middletown, Rhode Island.

== Legacy ==
Two days after Van Alen’s death, on July 5, 1991, in a Wimbledon semifinal, Stefan Edberg lost to Michael Stich 6–4, 6–7^{(5–7)}, 6–7^{(5–7)}, 6–7^{(2–7)} without losing his serve once throughout the match. Later, after hearing of Van Alen's death, Edberg said: "If he hadn't lived, Michael and I might still be out there playing".

In the first round of the 2010 Wimbledon Championships, American John Isner and French qualifier Nicolas Mahut played the longest match in tennis history, measured both by time and number of games. Over the course of three days spanning 11 hours, 5 minutes of play, Isner outlasted Mahut, 6–4, 3–6, 6–7^{(7–9)}, 7–^{6(7–3)}, 70–68, a staggering 183 games. The players combined to produce 2,198 combined strokes.

Based on his strong views, Van Alen proposed a simplified scoring system whereby tennis games would be scored simply by 1, 2 and 3, instead of 15, 30 and 40. The player who first got 4 points in a game would be declared the winner. He also proposed to eliminate the rules for ending the match. In case of a tied game, he proposed a nine point tie breaker, with the player who first scored five points becoming the winner of the match. VASSS or the Van Alen Streamlined Scoring System is a kind of scoring system used in tennis that promoted a sudden death to a tie-breaker. This kind of scoring ensures that prolonged matches, which are due to players having a tie in points, will not happen. The VASSS was invented in 1965.

His most famous innovation was the tie breaker, which was introduced in 1958 to speed up the game. It was part of a new scoring system based on table-tennis rules, and featured a limited number of points in each game and set.

== Contributions ==
- President, Newport Casino 1952
- President/Founder of National Hall of Fame
- Inventor of the first tie breaker
- Inventor of VASSS (Van Alen Streamlined Scoring System)
- National Court Tennis singles and doubles champion.
