= Art in the United States Capitol =

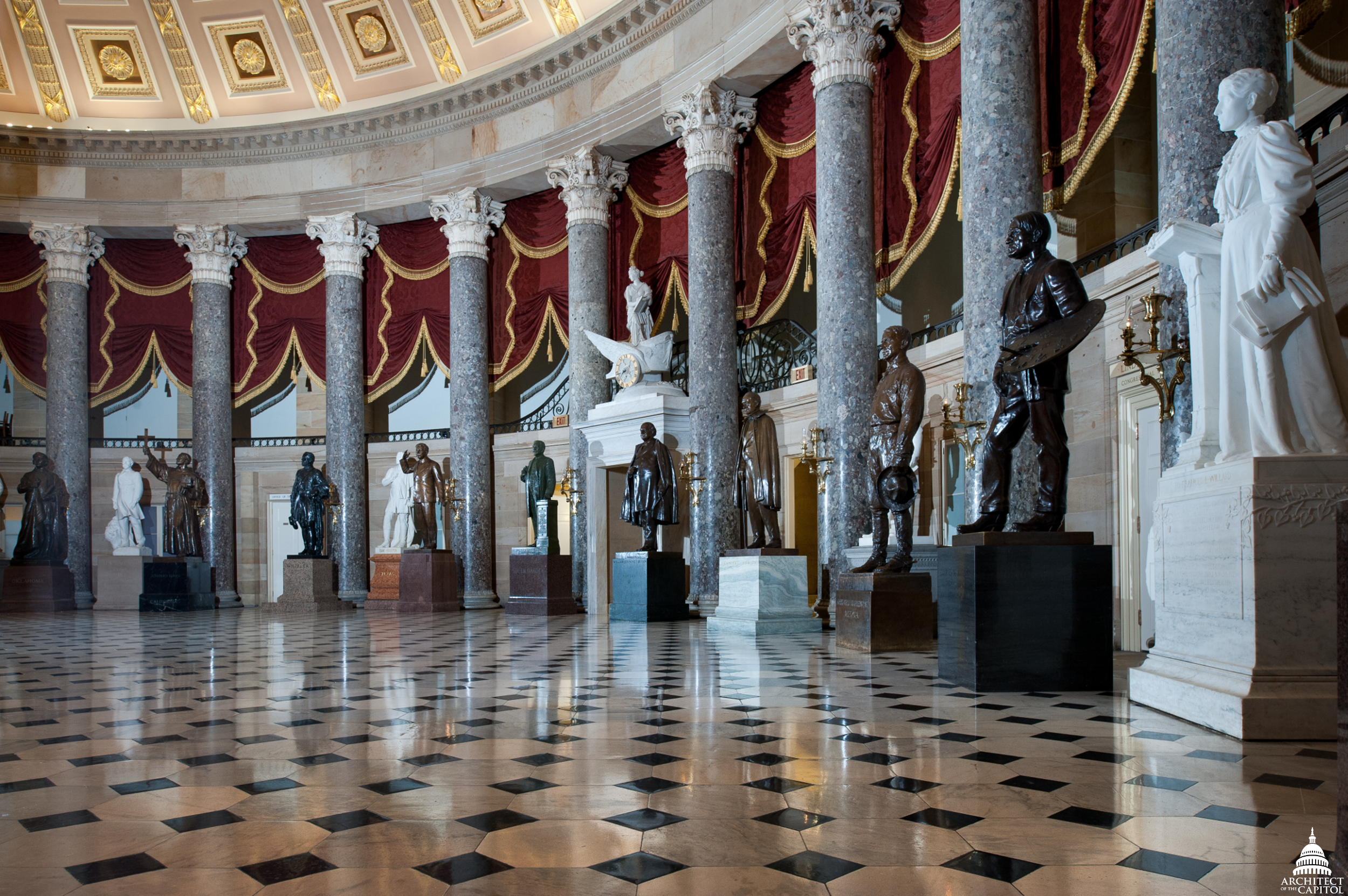
Sculptures in National Statuary Hall, as part of the National Statuary Hall Collection, in 2016

The United States Capitol displays public artworks by a variety of artists, including the National Statuary Hall Collection and United States Senate Vice Presidential Bust Collection.

== Sculpture ==
Sculptures include those within the National Statuary Hall Collection and United States Senate Vice Presidential Bust Collection. Other sculptures include a bust of Martin Luther King Jr., the Columbus Doors, and the Revolutionary War Door.

=== National Statuary Hall Collection ===
The National Statuary Hall Collection is composed of statues donated by individual U.S. states to honor persons notable in their history. Limited to two statues per state, the collection was originally set up in the old Hall of the House of Representatives, which was then renamed National Statuary Hall. The expanding collection has since been spread throughout the Capitol and its Visitor Center.

=== Other portrait sculpture ===
Other sculptures under the control of the Architect of the Capitol include the following:

Honoree	Medium	Sculptor	Date placed	Location
Abraham Lincoln	Marble	Vinnie Ream	1871	Rotunda
Alexander Hamilton	Marble	Horatio Stone	1868	Rotunda
Martin Luther King Jr.	Bronze	John Woodrow Wilson	1986	Rotunda
Edward Dickinson Baker	Marble	Horatio Stone	1876	Hall of Columns
Sojourner Truth	Bronze	Artis Lane	2009	Capitol Visitor Center
James Madison	Marble	Walker Hancock	1976	James Madison Memorial Building
Portrait Monument to Lucretia Mott, Elizabeth Cady Stanton and Susan B. Anthony	Marble	Adelaide Johnson	1920	Rotunda
Thomas Jefferson	Bronze	Pierre-Jean David d’Angers	1834	Rotunda
Ulysses S. Grant	Marble	Franklin Simmons	1899	Rotunda
Rosa Parks	Bronze	Eugene Daub	2013	National Statuary Hall
Frederick Douglass	Bronze	Steven Weitzman	2013	Capitol Visitor Center
John Marshall	Bronze	William Wetmore Story	1884	Capitol Grounds, West Front
Robert A. Taft	Bronze	Wheeler Williams	1959	Square 633, Capitol Grounds

=== Allegorical or mythological sculpture ===
Title	Medium	Sculptor	Date placed	Location	Comment
Car of History	Marble	Carlo Franzoni	1819	National Statuary Hall	represents Clio, the muse of history
Liberty and the Eagle	Plaster	Enrico Causici	1817–1819	National Statuary Hall	
Statue of Freedom	Bronze	Thomas Crawford	1863	top of dome	
The Progress of Civilization	Marble	Thomas Crawford	1863	Pediment over Senate Portico, East Front	
Apotheosis of Democracy	Marble	Paul Wayland Bartlett	1916	Pediment, East Front	Figures of Peace protecting Genius surrounded by scenes representing Industry and Agriculture
Genius of America (1)	Sandstone	Luigi Persico	1825–1828	Pediment, East Central Entrance	America with Justice and Hope, duplicated and replaced by Genius of America (2)
Genius of America (2)	Marble	Bruno Mankowski	1959–1960	Pediment, East Central Entrance	duplicate in marble of Genius of America (1)
Fame and Peace Crowning George Washington (1)	Sandstone	Antonio Capellano	1827	East central portico, above the Rotunda doors	duplicated and replaced by Fame and Peace ... (2)
Fame and Peace Crowning George Washington (2)	Marble	G. Gianetti	1959–1960	East central portico, above the Rotunda doors	duplicate in marble of Fame and Peace ... (1)
Justice and History	Marble	Thomas Crawford	1863	East Front	

== See also ==
- List of artwork at the United States Capitol complex
- Art in the White House
