= Mountain Grove Cemetery, Bridgeport =

Rural cemetery in Fairfield County, Connecticut

Mountain Grove Cemetery
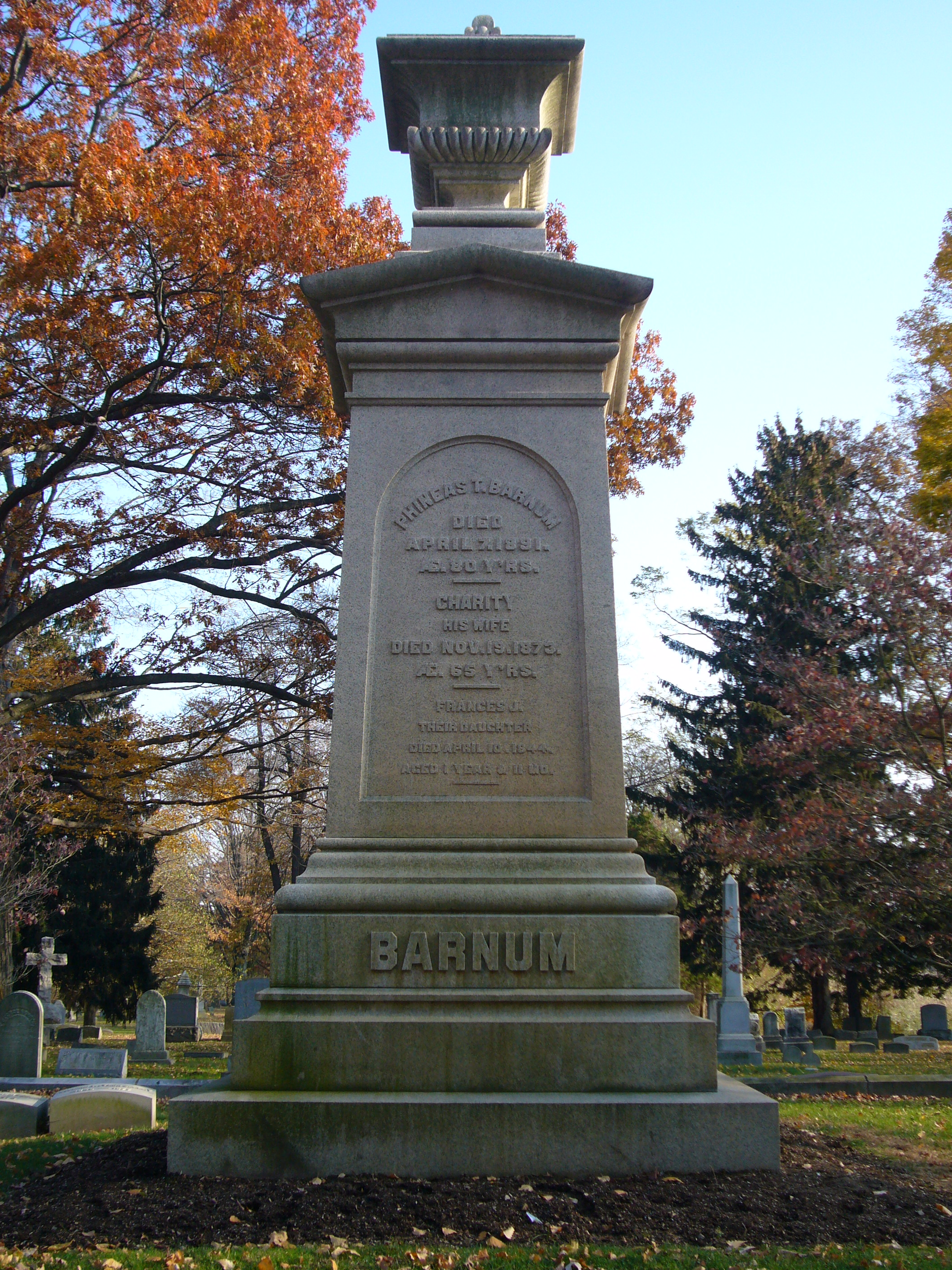
- P. T. Barnum's gravestone at Mountain Grove
- Interactive map of Mountain Grove Cemetery

Details
- Established: 1849
- Location: Bridgeport, Connecticut
- Country: United States
- Coordinates: 41°10′19″N 73°13′19″W
- Type: Public
- Website: www.mtgrovecemetery.org
- Find a Grave: Mountain Grove Cemetery

Mountain Grove Cemetery is a historic cemetery in Bridgeport, Connecticut, United States. It was laid out in 1849 in the rural cemetery design in a park-like, rural setting away from the center of the city.

The cemetery was founded by showman P. T. Barnum, who is buried there. "The original grounds were surveyed and designed by Horatio Stone and Mr. [John] Moody," the cemetery's first superintendent.

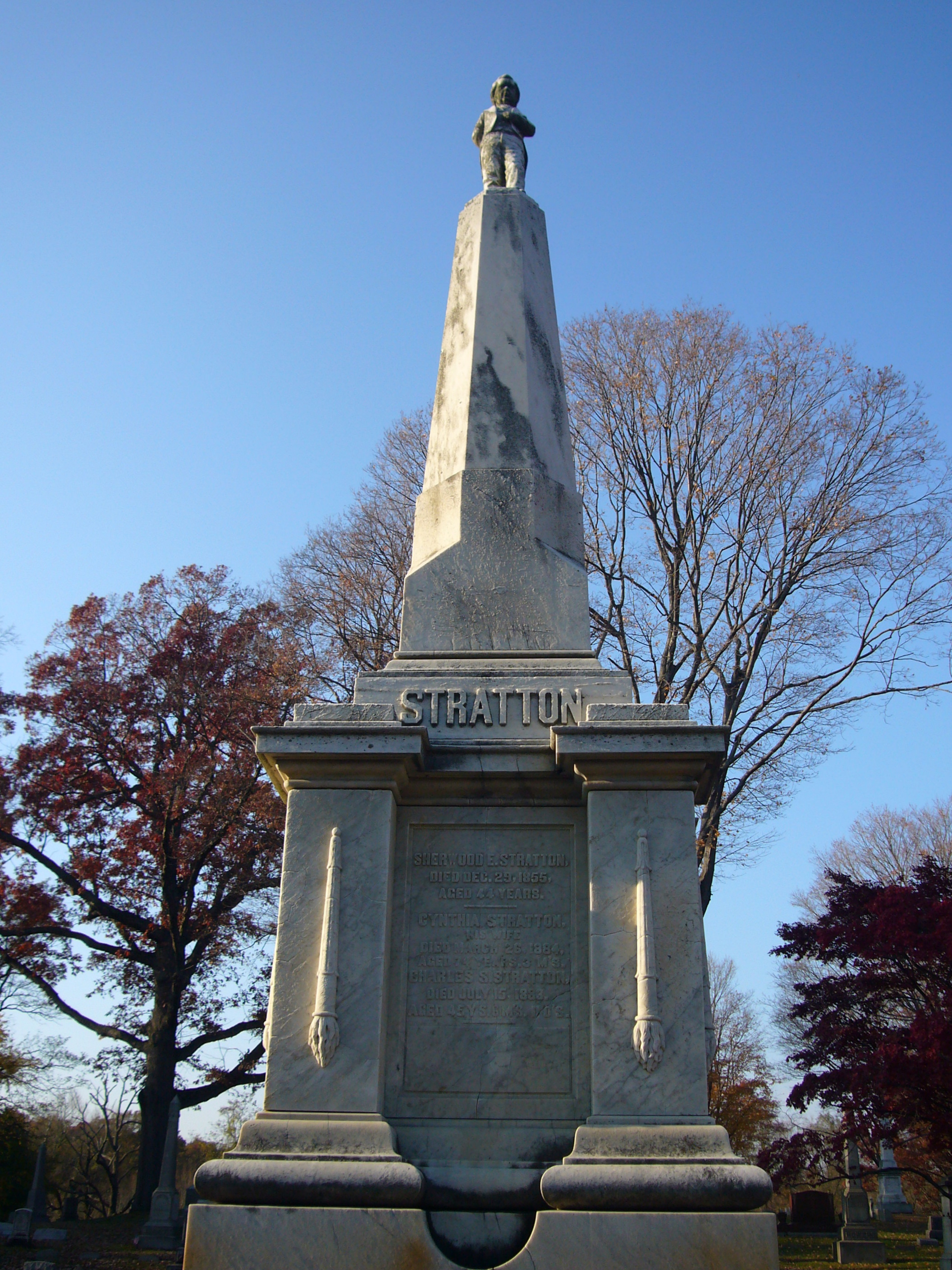
Tom Thumb's gravestone

== Notable interments ==
Notables interred here include:

- Neal Ball, baseball player
- P. T. Barnum, showman and entrepreneur
- William D. Bishop, politician
- Fanny Crosby, gospel hymn composer, poet
- Vernon Dalhart, country singer and songwriter
- Anselm Franz, aviation pioneer, developer of the Jumo 004, Lycoming T53, and Honeywell T55 jet engines.
- Robert Lawson, the Caldecott Medal and Newbery Medal winning author and illustrator.
- James Chaffee Loomis, state politician and mayor of Bridgeport
- John E. W. Thompson, an African-American minister resident of Haiti and chargé d'affaires to San Domingo.
- General Tom Thumb, the little person, whose monument includes a life-size statue of him at the top of a tall obelisk; and his wife Lavinia Warren
- Kathleen Moore, precursor to USCG, United States Lighthouse Service; credited with saving 21 lives as a light housekeeper. USCGC Kathleen Moore was named after her in her honor.
- Samuel Russell Wilmot, (1829-1897) prolific inventor with over 150 domestic and international patents including a portable steam saw, the spring steel hoop for hoop skirts, the cold rolled steel process, and the screw micrometer; founder of Bridgeport Brass (originally named Wilmot & Kissam in Brooklyn, NY-moved to Bridgeport at P. T. Barnum’s request) and founder of American Tube & Stamping (originally Wilmot & Hobbs) in Bridgeport, CT.

== Civil War monument ==
The cemetery includes a Civil War monument, Pro Patria. The granite stele monument with bronze plaque, raised in 1906 by the Bridgeport Elias Howe Grand Army of the Republic post and the State of Connecticut, is dedicated "IN LOVING MEMORY OF THOSE WHO DID NOT RETURN". The monument, by the Bridgeport sculptor Paul Winters Morris (1865–1916) includes bas-relief figures of soldiers with heads bowed. The monument is at the front of a plot marked by pyramids of cannonballs that contains the graves of about 83 Civil War veterans.

== See also ==
- History of Bridgeport, Connecticut
