= Hall of Columns =

Hallway in the United States Capitol

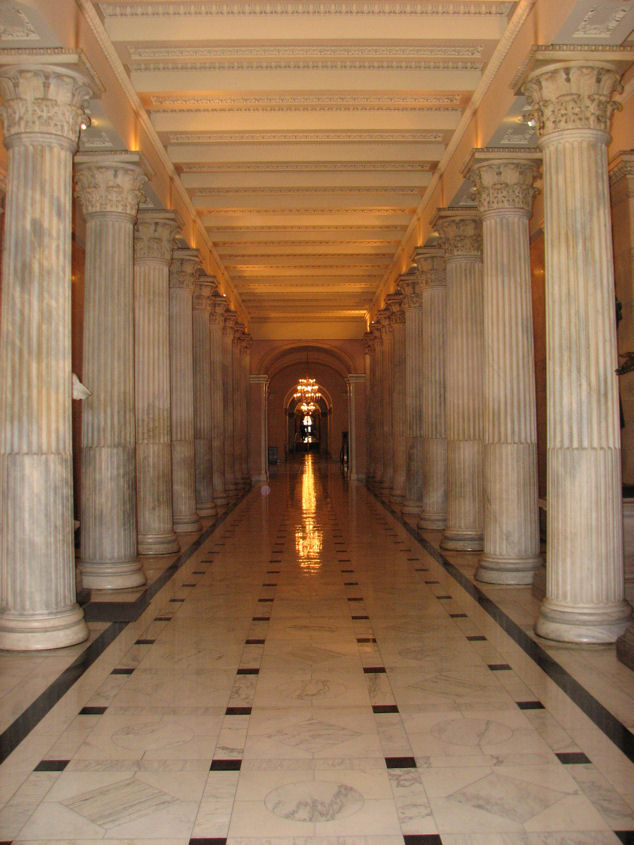
Hall of Columns facing north (2007)

The Hall of Columns is a more than 100-foot-long (30 m) hallway lined with 28 fluted columns in the south wing extension of the United States Capitol in Washington, D.C. It is also the gallery for 18 statues of the National Statuary Hall Collection.

== History ==
The "Hall of Columns" emerged as part of the necessitated expansion of the north and south Capitol wings in the mid-nineteenth century due to the increased numbers of elected senators and representatives with the continued expansion of the United States westward and admission of more states to the Union from their previous status as Territories, now standing of 34. The original chambers of the U.S. House of Representatives and the U.S. Senate had become too crowded with the additional senators and representatives. Under the guidance of the then fourth Architect of the Capitol Thomas U. Walter, plans were drawn up to expand the two sides (wings) in the previous original central block of the Capitol (also location of the rotunda and low copper-covered dome above it from the original Capitol architects: William Thornton, followed by Benjamin Henry Latrobe and Charles Bulfinch architectural designs beginning in 1793) and build new, larger chambers with additional rooms and offices for both houses.

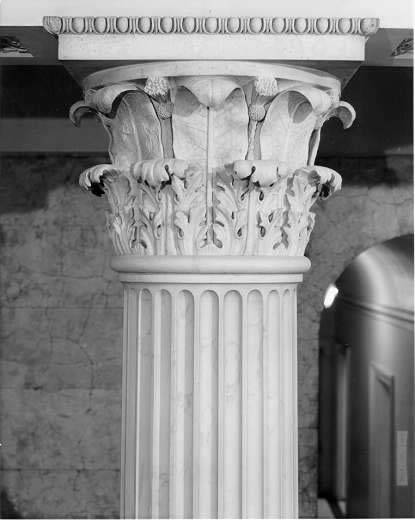
Capital of one of the columns

Built directly beneath the Chamber of the House of Representatives, construction had begun sometime before 1855, with the implementation of a cast iron ceiling, forged in Baltimore by the well known local foundry Hayward, Bartlett, and Co. The walls, themselves, were made with an imitation marble known as scagliola. The floor was set with imported encaustic Minton tiles from England (the same still found in the Brumidi Corridors, designed by artist Constantino Brumidi), but were eventually replaced in the 1920s with a floor of Alabama and New York marble. By 1855, all the columns, made from marble quarried from Lee, Massachusetts, were finished and set in place.

The capitals of the columns are based on Corinthian columns, but adjusted to reflect an American style with the usage of thistles and native tobacco leaves in the cast iron.

== National Statuary Hall Collection ==
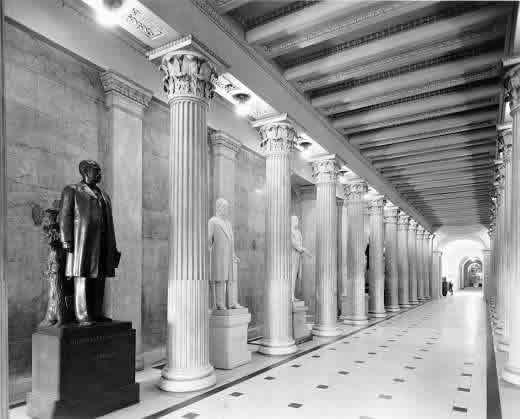
Older image of Hall of Columns facing north.

- Alexander Hamilton representing all the states, in marble, by Horatio Stone in 1868.
- Francis Preston Blair from Missouri, in marble by Alexander Doyle in 1899.
- Charles Carroll of Carrollton from Maryland, in bronze, by Richard E. Brooks in 1903.
- Zachariah Chandler from Michigan, in marble, by Charles H. Niehaus in 1913 (this statue was replaced in 2011, and now sits in Michigan).
- Jacob Collamer from Vermont, in marble, by Preston Powers in 1881.
- Jabez L. M. Curry from Alabama, in marble, by Dante Sodini in 1908 (this statue was replaced in 2009).
- James Z. George from Mississippi, in bronze, by Augustus Lukeman in 1931.
- Nathanael Greene from Rhode Island, in marble, by Henry Kirke Brown in 1870.
- Ernest Gruening from Alaska, in bronze, by George Anthonisen in 1977.
- James Harlan from Iowa, in bronze, by Nellie Walker in 1910 (this statue was replaced in 2014).
- Mother Joseph from Washington, in bronze, by Felix W. de Weldon in 1980 (this statue has been now moved into the Congressional Visitor Center).
- Philip Kearny from New Jersey, in bronze, by Henry Kirke Brown in 1888.
- John E. Kenna from West Virginia, in marble, by Alexander Doyle in 1901.
- Thomas Starr King from California, in bronze, by Haig Patigian in 1931. (Removed by the State of California and replaced with that of the 40th President Ronald Wilson Reagan in the Rotunda)
- Eusebio Kino from Arizona, in marble, by Suzanne Silvercruys in 1965 (this statue has been now moved into the Congressional Visitor Center).
- Julius Sterling Morton from Nebraska, in bronze, by Rudulph Evans in 1937.
- James Shields from Illinois, in bronze, by Leonard W. Volk in 1893.
- Edmund Kirby Smith from Florida, in bronze, by C. Adrian Pillars in 1922.
- Joseph Ward from South Dakota, in marble, by Bruno Beghé in 1963.
- John Winthrop from Massachusetts, in marble, by Richard S. Greenough in 1876.
