= 4th Illinois Volunteer Infantry Regiment =

4th Regiment of Illinois Volunteers 4th Illinois Volunteer Infantry Regiment
- Illinois flag
- Active: July 1846 – May 1847; 1898–1899
- Country: United States
- Branch: Infantry
- Engagements: Mexican–American War: Siege of Veracruz; Battle of Cerro Gordo; Spanish–American War

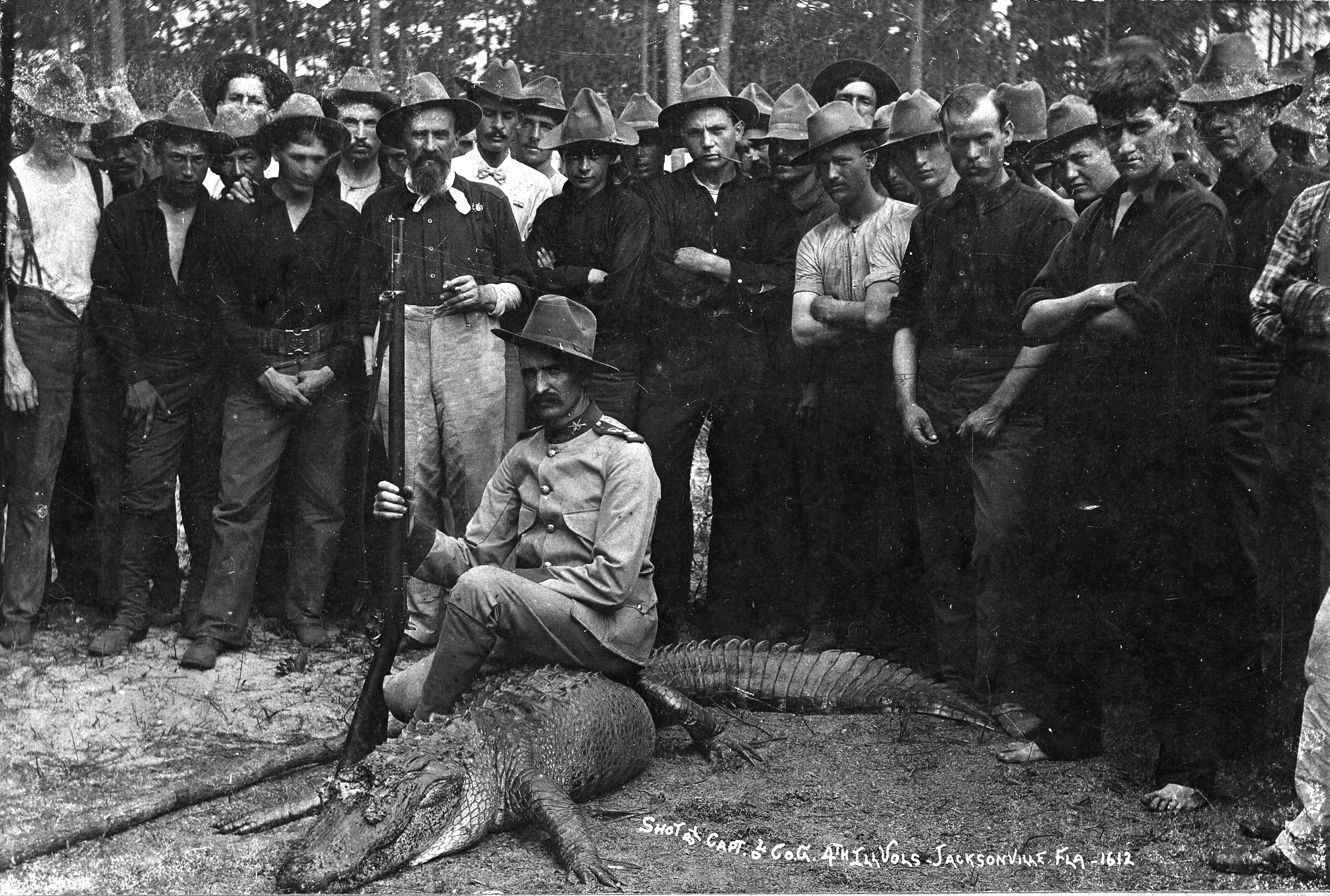
Captain of the 4th Illinois Volunteers with an alligator he shot in Jacksonville, Florida.

4th Illinois Volunteer Infantry Regiment was an infantry regiment of the United States Volunteers that served in the United States Army during the Mexican–American War and Spanish–American War.

== Service ==
During the Mexican–American War the regiment was known as the 4th Regiment of Illinois Volunteers and was raised for 12 months (July 1846 – May 1847). It was under the command of Colonel Edward D. Baker. At the Battle of Cerro Gordo, the regiment surprised the command of General Santa Anna, capturing his wooden leg.

During the Spanish–American War the regiment served as part of the occupation forces in Cuba. It was mustered in on 19–20 May 1898 at Springfield, Illinois, and was mustered out on 2 May 1899 at Augusta, Georgia.

== See also ==
- List of U.S. Army, Navy and Volunteer units in the Mexican–American War
- United States Volunteers
