= Edward D. Baker =

American politician, lawyer and military leader (1811–1861)

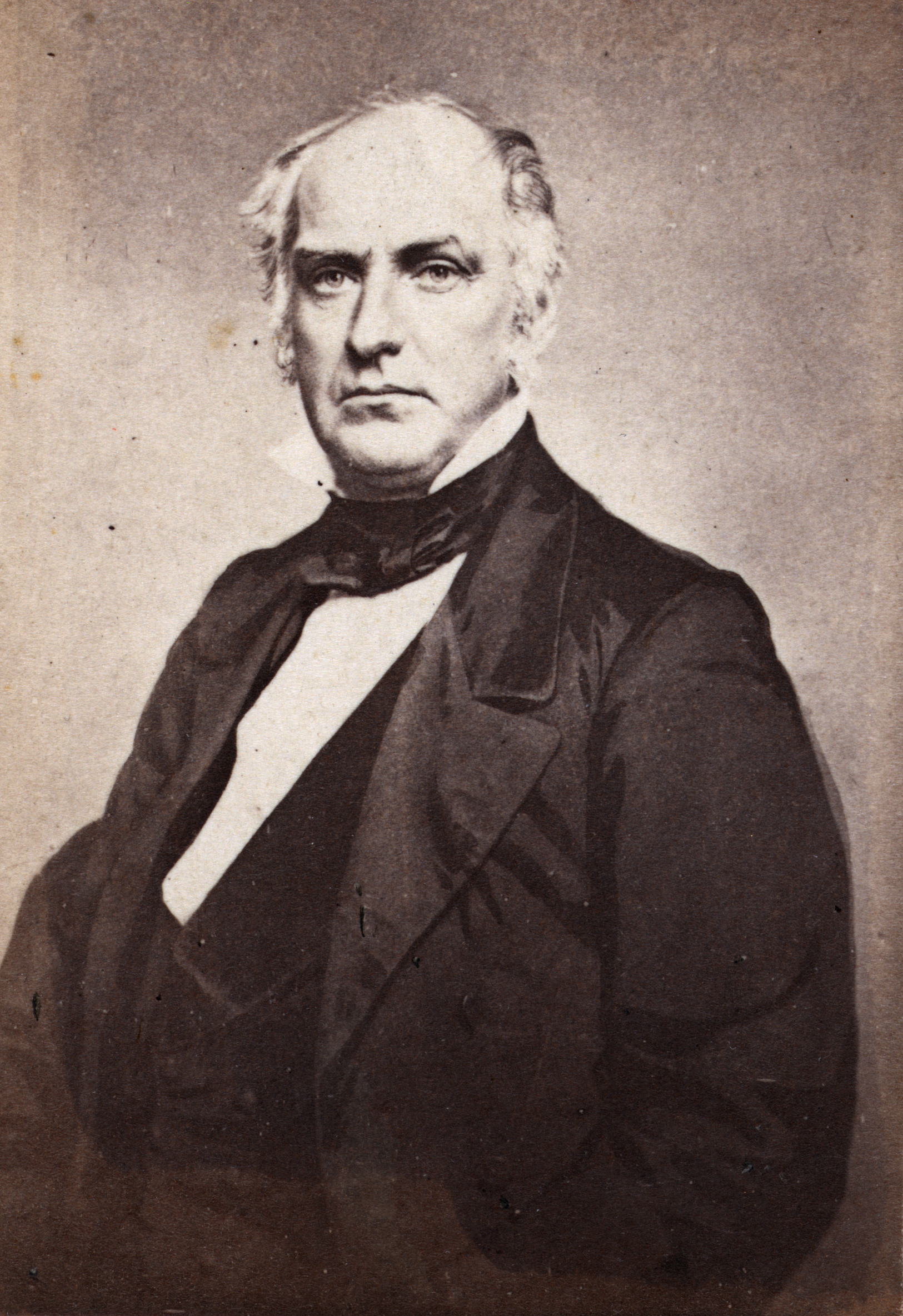
- Baker c. 1861

United States Senator from Oregon
- In office October 2, 1860 – October 21, 1861
- Preceded by: Delazon Smith
- Succeeded by: Benjamin Stark

Member of the U.S. House of Representatives from Illinois
- In office March 4, 1845 – January 15, 1847
- Preceded by: John J. Hardin
- Succeeded by: John Henry
- Constituency: 7th district
- In office March 4, 1849 – March 3, 1851
- Preceded by: Thomas J. Turner
- Succeeded by: Thompson Campbell
- Constituency: 6th district

Member of the Illinois Senate
- In office 1840–1844

Member of the Illinois House of Representatives
- In office 1837–1840

Personal details
- Born: Edward Dickinson Baker; February 24, 1811 London, England
- Died: October 21, 1861 (aged 50) Ball's Bluff, Virginia, Confederate States
- Party: Whig (before 1854); Free Soil (1854–1859); Republican (1859–1861)
- Spouse: Mary Lee
- Children: 3 sons and 2 daughters

Military service
- Allegiance: United States • Union
- Branch/service: United States Army • Union Army
- Years of service: 1846–1847; 1861
- Rank: Colonel
- Commands: 4th Illinois Infantry; 3rd Brigade, 3rd Division; 3rd Volunteer Division (temporary); 71st Pennsylvania Infantry Regiment; Philadelphia Brigade
- Battles/wars: Mexican–American War • Battle of Cerro Gordo; American Civil War • Battle of Ball's Bluff †

Edward Dickinson Baker (February 24, 1811 – October 21, 1861) was an American politician, lawyer, and US army officer. In his political career, Baker served in the U.S. House of Representatives from Illinois and later as a U.S. senator from Oregon. He was also known as an orator and poet. A long-time close friend of the president of the United States, Abraham Lincoln, Baker served as U.S. Army colonel during both the Mexican–American War and the American Civil War. Baker was killed in the Battle of Ball's Bluff while leading a Union Army regiment, becoming the only sitting U.S. senator ever to be killed in a military engagement.

== Early life and education ==
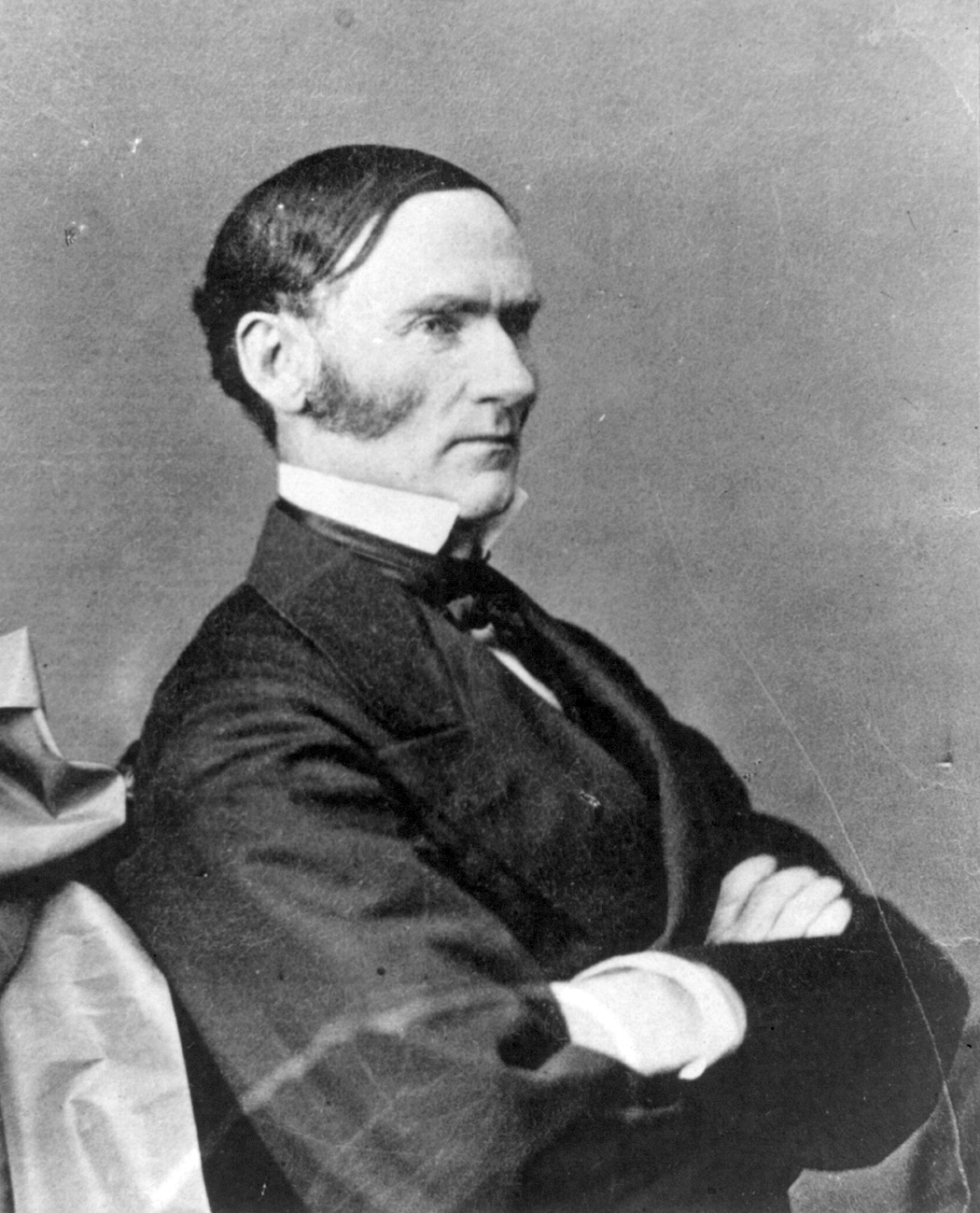
Edward Baker in 1850 as a member of the U.S. House of Representatives

Born in London in 1811 to school teacher Edward Baker and Lucy Dickinson Baker, poor but educated Quakers, the boy Edward Baker and his family left England and emigrated to the United States in 1816, arriving in Philadelphia, where Baker's father established a school. Ned, as he was called, attended his father's school before quitting to apprentice as a loom operator in a weaving factory. In 1825, the family left Philadelphia and traveled to New Harmony, Indiana, a utopian community on the Ohio River led by Robert Owen and sought to follow communitarian ideals.

The family left New Harmony in 1826 and moved to Belleville in Illinois Territory, a town near St. Louis. Baker and his father bought a horse and cart and started a drayage business that young Ned operated in St. Louis. Baker met Governor Ninian Edwards, who allowed Baker access to his private law library. Later he moved to Carrollton, Illinois, where he was admitted to the bar in 1830.

=== Marriage ===
On April 27, 1831, Baker married Mary Ann Foss; they would have 3 sons and 2 daughters together.

== Illinois lawyer ==
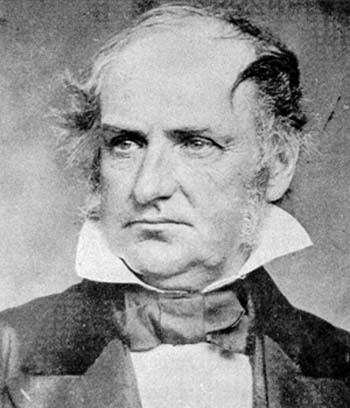
Edward Dickinson Baker

Shortly after his marriage, Baker affiliated with the Disciples of Christ and engaged in part-time preaching, which as a by-product served to spread awareness of his skill in public oratory, an activity that eventually made him famous. A year after his marriage, Baker participated in the Black Hawk War but did not engage in hostilities. Around 1835, he became acquainted with Abraham Lincoln and soon became involved in local politics, being elected to the Illinois House of Representatives on July 1, 1837, and serving on the Illinois Senate from 1840 to 1844. In 1844, while living in Springfield, he defeated Lincoln for the nomination for the 7th U.S. congressional seat and was elected as a Whig. Baker and Lincoln became fast friends, an association which lent credibility to a claim that Baker baptized Lincoln. However, this claim is denied as apocryphal by later leaders of the Restoration Movement with which Baker's church of Christ was associated. The two remained close friends, however, with Lincoln naming one of his sons Edward Baker Lincoln, affectionately called "Eddie." Lincoln and Baker occasionally competed in Fives, a form of handball.

In September 1844, Baker exhibited impetuous bravado in an incident arising out of the murder of Joseph Smith, the founder of the Latter Day Saint movement, by a mob in a jail near Nauvoo, Illinois. As a colonel in the local militia, Baker was part of a group pursuing the mob leaders, who had fled across the Mississippi River into Missouri. Rather than wait for others to join him, Baker crossed the river and apprehended the fugitives.

Baker served in Congress from March 4, 1845, until his resignation on December 24, 1846, to take effect on January 15, 1847. He resigned in a dispute over the legality of his serving in Congress and the army. The controversy arose from Article I, Section 6, of the U.S. Constitution, the so-called Incompatibility Clause, which prohibits an "officer of the United States" serving in either house of Congress.

During the Mexican–American War, Baker briefly dropped out of politics and was commissioned as a colonel of the Fourth Regiment of the Illinois Volunteer Infantry, on July 4, 1846. In the Battle of Cerro Gordo, the regiment was assigned to General James Shields's Illinois brigade in General David E. Twiggs's division. When Shields was badly wounded in an artillery barrage, Baker boldly led the brigade against the entrenched artillery battery, resulting in the capture of the guns. General Winfield Scott later said, "The brigade so gallantly led by General Shields, and, after his fall, by Colonel Baker, deserves high commendation for its fine behavior and success." Soon after Cerro Gordo, the enlistment period ended for men of the 4th Illinois and they returned to New Orleans and were discharged on May 25. Baker returned to Springfield in 1848, but, rather than run against Lincoln again for nomination to Congress, Baker moved to Galena, where he was nominated and elected as a Whig to the 31st Congress (March 4, 1849 – March 4, 1851). He was not a candidate for renomination in 1850.

In July 1850, he proposed to the Panama Railroad Company that he recruit men to help build the railroad. Baker agreed to pay their expenses from St. Louis and in New Granada, and the company would send them on to San Francisco by May 1. He became ill in Istmo with a tropical disease and had to return to the U.S.

== Military service ==
Commissioned on July 4, 1846, as Colonel of the Fourth Regiment, Illinois Volunteer Infantry, he participated with his regiment in the Siege of Vera Cruz and also commanded one of the brigades involved in the Battle of Cerro Gordo. He continued to serve with his regiment until he was honorably mustered out on May 29, 1847. After his honorable discharge, he engaged in a 14-year break from military service, during which he served in the Thirty-first U.S. Congress from 1849 to 1851, relocated to San Francisco, where he practiced law and, in 1860, relocated to Oregon, where he was elected as a Republican to the United States Senate to fill a vacancy in the term beginning March 4, 1859.

In response to President Abraham Lincoln's call for 75,000 volunteers to help defend the nation's capital following the fall of Fort Sumter to Confederate forces in mid-April 1861, he raised a regiment at the dawn of the American Civil War, recruiting soldiers from New York City and Philadelphia. Offered a commission as brigadier-general of volunteers on May 17, 1861, he declined the honor, opting instead to serve as the colonel of the Seventy-first Regiment, Pennsylvania Volunteer Infantry and major-general of volunteers 1861; however, his tenure was short-lived. On October 21, 1861, he was killed in the Battle of Ball's Bluff, Virginia. His remains were subsequently returned to California, and laid to rest at the San Francisco National Cemetery.

== California politician ==
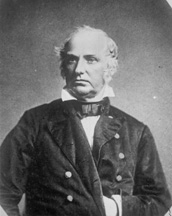
Baker

After Baker did not get a Cabinet position under President Zachary Taylor, he moved to San Francisco in 1852. He operated a successful law practice, despite what some described as sloppy business practices and inattention to detail, characterizations that had plagued him earlier: as a legislator, he was said to pay little attention to mundane details. Baker met Isaac J. Wistar, sixteen years Baker's junior and from a prominent Philadelphia family. He said Baker did not keep records and relied on his memory and a bundle of papers he carried around in his hat. Baker disdained preparing for legal cases and thought it was more effective to speak extemporaneously to a jury. Baker received substantial fees but spent the money as fast as it came in, Wistar said, and some of those expenditures paid faro debts. The two formed a successful partnership at Montgomery and Jackson Streets.

California had been admitted to the United States in 1850 as a free state, but by the later part of the 1850s, the state was being pulled in different directions over the issue of slavery, and Baker became a leader in the movement to keep California in the Union. In 1855, he ran for a seat in the state senate as a Whig on the Free Soil Party party ticket but lost because the Whig party had collapsed.

It was in those days that Baker adopted the name "Gray Eagle" from a poem by John Neal because of his gray hair (though he was balding). He was just under six feet tall. Baker became involved in a notorious criminal case in 1855 that threatened his legal and political future. He took up a job offered by Belle Cora who hired and paid Baker to defend her husband, Charles Cora, a well-known gambler accused of killing a United States marshal. The jury failed to reach a verdict, and then Cora was tried and lynched by a vigilante mob. The experience led Baker to become active in the Law and Order Party, which opposed actions of the San Francisco Committee of Vigilance, which took the law into its own hands. Because of the committee's criticism of his actions, Baker temporarily left the city and spent some time in the Sacramento area.

In September 1859, after the Broderick–Terry duel, Baker spoke at David C. Broderick's funeral.

== Oregon politician ==
Frustrated by his failure to win a seat in the U.S. House of Representatives in 1859, Baker looked to greener political pastures to the north. Oregon held special interest for people who had once lived in Illinois, including men he had known in Springfield. He had become interested in Oregon politics in 1857, when Dr. Anson Henry, a friend from Springfield who had moved to Oregon, told Baker he could win the Senate election there. After statehood was achieved on February 14, 1859, Oregon Republicans asked Baker to come to their state to run for the Senate and counter the Democratic strength there.

By the end of February 1860, the Baker family had moved into a house in Salem on what is now the campus of Willamette University. Baker opened a law office and started campaigning for Republicans around the state. In Salem on July 4, he acknowledged the rumbles of secession threats and proclaimed his willingness to die for his country: "If it be reserved for me to lay my unworthy life upon the altar of my country in defending it from internal assailants, I declare here today that I aspire to no higher glory than that the sun of my life may go down beneath the shadow of freedom's temple and baptize the emblem of the nation's greatness, the Stars and Stripes, that float so proudly before us today, in my heart's warmest blood."

The Oregon Legislative Assembly met in Salem in September 1860 to elect two men to the Senate. In an effort to keep Baker from receiving the required majority of 26 votes, six pro-slavery senators left the meeting and hid in a barn to prevent a quorum. They were brought back, and the legislators reached a compromise on October 7 and elected James Nesmith, a Douglas Democrat, and Baker. The Douglas Democrats supported Baker because of his sincerity and support of popular sovereignty.

== U.S. Senator ==
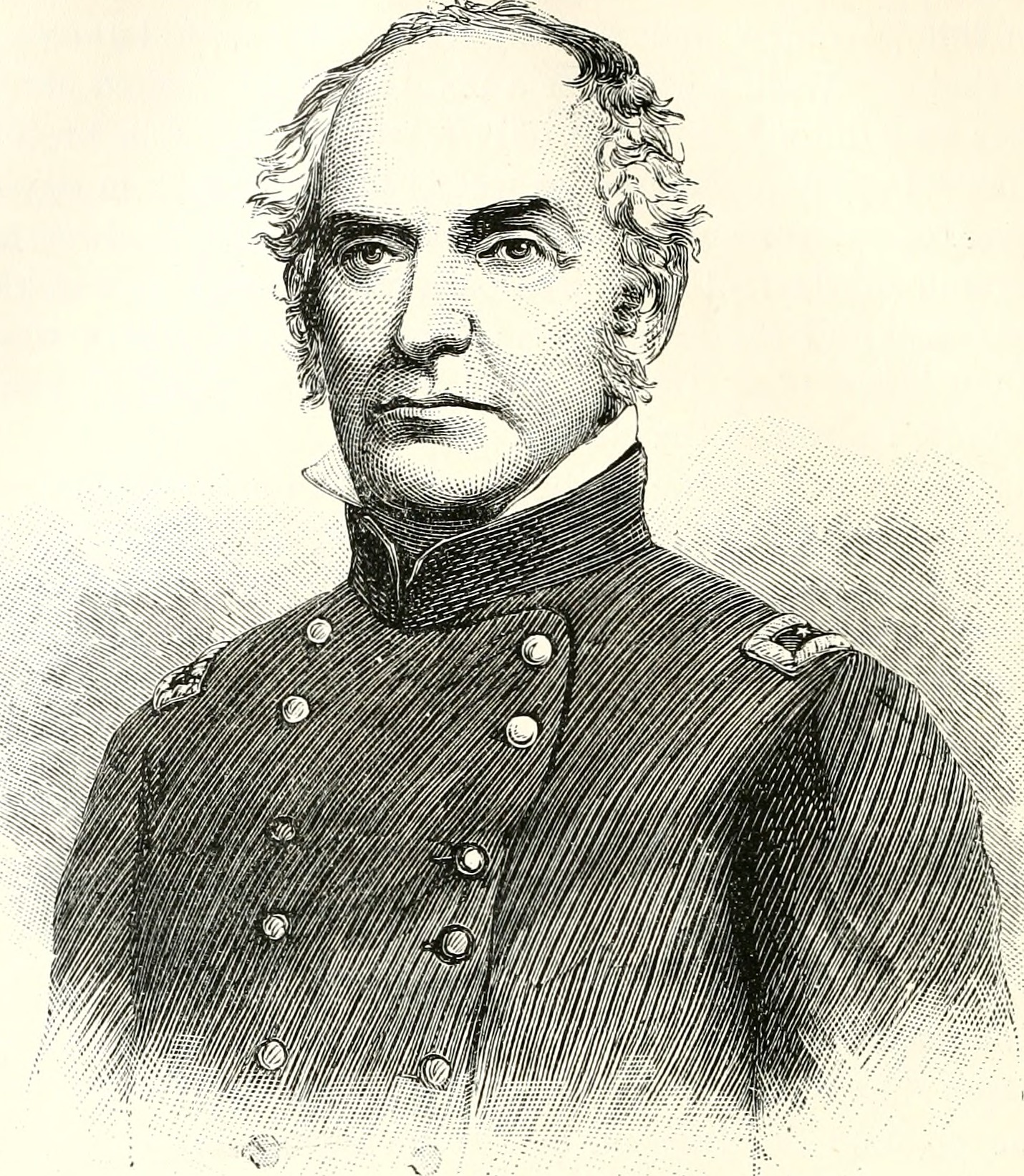
Baker in American Civil War

Baker took his seat in the Senate on December 5, 1860. His Oregon colleague, Senator Joseph Lane, disliked him so much that he refused to follow tradition and introduce Baker to the Senate, so Democratic senator Milton Latham of California did it.

On December 31, Senator Judah Benjamin of Louisiana argued that Southern states had a constitutional right to secede and that other states would soon join South Carolina, which had seceded on December 20. Baker refuted Benjamin's argument in a three-hour speech a day later. He acknowledged that he was opposed to interference with slave owners in slave states, but he was also opposed to secession and the extension of slavery into new territories and states. In March 1861, he indicated a willingness to compromise on some issues to prevent the breakup of the country.

=== Lincoln inauguration ===
Abraham Lincoln was inaugurated on March 4, 1861. Baker and Senator James A. Pearce of Maryland faced backward in the presidential carriage as they rode from the White House to the Capitol, and Lincoln and outgoing president James Buchanan faced forward. On horseback at the head of their cavalry escort was the man who would figure prominently as Baker's commander at the Battle of Ball's Bluff. Colonel Charles P. Stone was an up-and-coming Union officer who was responsible for security in Washington for the inauguration. Stone spurred his horse to excite other horses in the escort party because he believed the prancing horses would form a better protective barrier and protect the dignitaries in the carriage. Baker introduced Lincoln to the audience gathered on the east portico of the Capitol: "Fellow citizens, I introduce to you, Abraham Lincoln, President of the United States."

Lincoln did not name Baker to his cabinet because his support in the Senate was so critical. If Baker had resigned his Senate seat, Oregon's pro-slavery Democratic governor, John Whiteaker, would have appointed a pro-slavery Democrat to take his place.

== Civil War ==
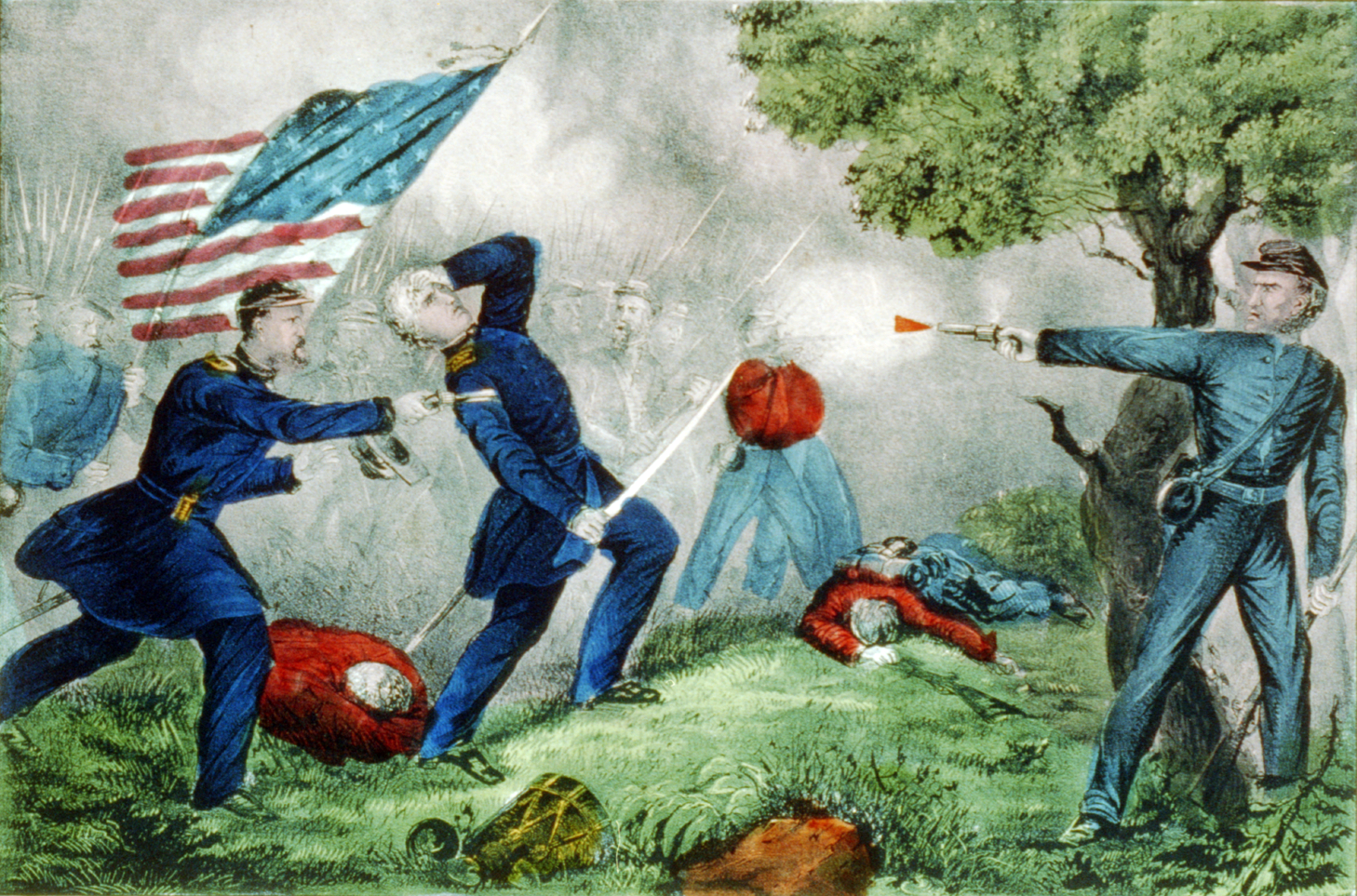
Death of Colonel Edward D. Baker at the Battle of Ball's Bluff, October 21, 1861

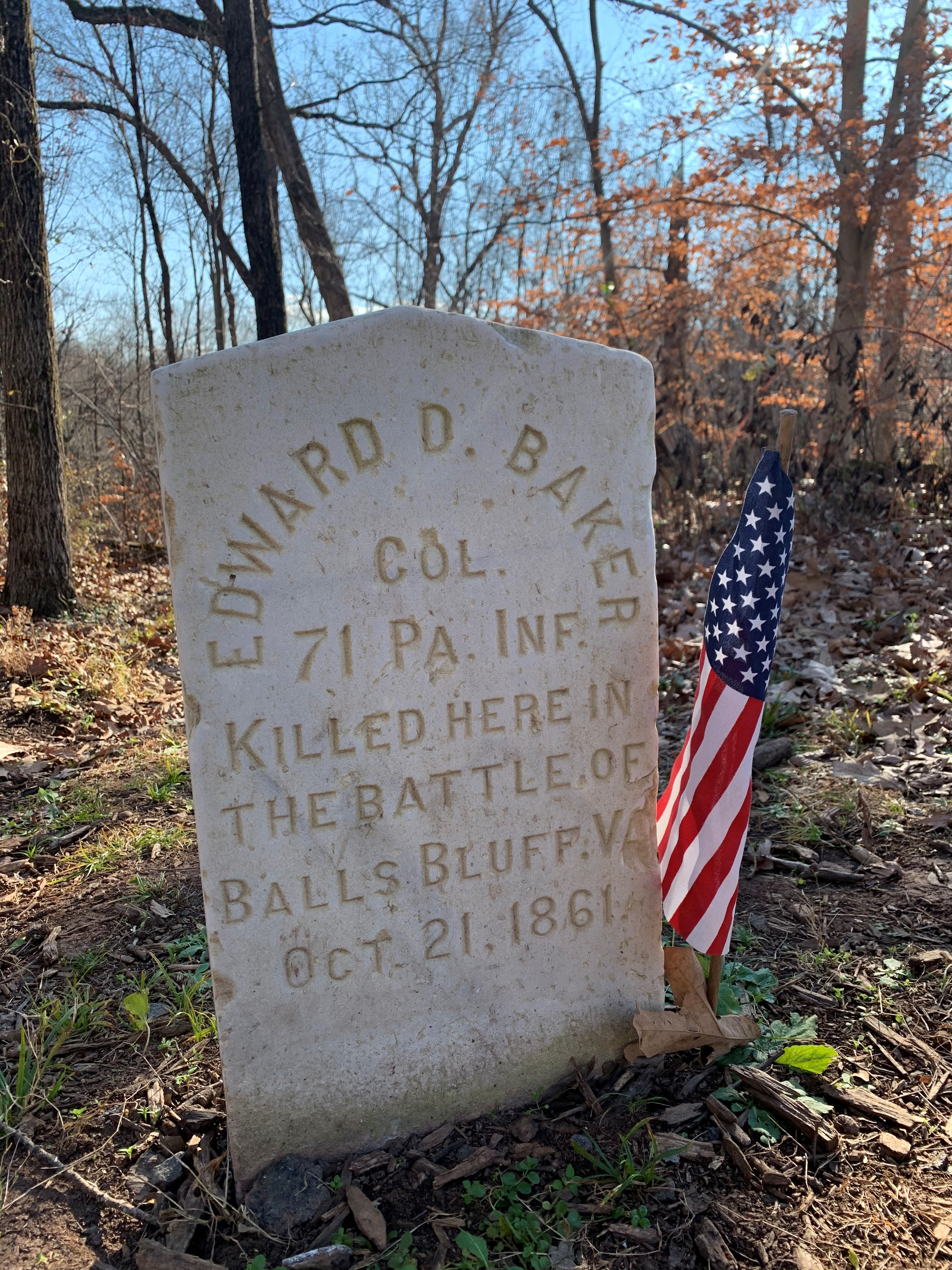
Marker for where Edward D. Baker was killed during the Battle of Balls Bluff

The Civil War began April 12 when Confederate artillery fired on Fort Sumter, and three days later, President Lincoln called for 75,000 volunteers. Baker left the Senate to go to New York City, where he spoke for two hours to a crowd of 100,000 in Union Square on April 19. He was blunt: "The hour for conciliation is past; the gathering for battle is at hand, and the country requires that every man shall do his duty." He affirmed his own willingness to take up arms: "If Providence shall will it, this feeble hand shall draw a sword, never yet dishonored, not to fight for honor on a foreign field, but for country, for home, for law, for government, for Constitution, for right, for freedom, for humanity." The following day, he met with 200 men from California who wanted to form a regiment that would symbolize the commitment of the West Coast to the Union cause. On May 8, Baker was authorized by Secretary of War Simon Cameron to form the California Regiment with him as its commanding officer with the rank of colonel.

Baker telegraphed Isaac J. Wistar, his San Francisco law partner, who was back in Philadelphia and asked him to help recruit and organize the regiment. When Wistar asked about rank, Baker replied, "I cannot at this moment accept military rank without jeopardizing my seat in the Senate. But you know my relations with Lincoln, and if you do that for me, I can assure you that within six months I shall be a Major-General and you shall have a Brigadier-General's commission and a satisfactory command under me." Baker wrote to Lincoln on June 11, asking that he be given a command that would "not make him second to everybody." His efforts paid off; on July 31, Lincoln sent the Senate names of men he was recommending for appointments as brigadier generals. On the list, besides Charles Stone, Ulysses Grant and others, was Edward Baker.

He told the Senate he would refuse the commission because of its doubtful legality. He said he was pleased that the government would allow him a command with his rank of colonel, "quite sufficient for all my military aspirations," which indicates he believed he could be a colonel and remain in the Senate. He wrote to Lincoln on August 31 to decline the appointment as brigadier general, citing the problem of incompatibility and implying that he had the government's permission to hold a colonel's commission. To add to the mystery, the War Department notified Baker on September 21 that Lincoln had appointed him to be a major general. A list of Civil War generals based on official records indicates Baker held the rank of major general. However, the U.S. Senate states that he was a colonel.

He was assigned command of a brigade in Stone's division, guarding fords along the Potomac River north of Washington. At a dinner with Journalist George Wilkes in August, Baker predicted he would die in an early battle of the war: "I am certain I shall not live through this war, and if my troops should show any want of resolution, I shall fall in the first battle. I cannot afford, after my career in Mexico, and as a Senator of the United States, to turn my face from the enemy."

Baker stopped at the White House on October 20 to visit his old friend. Lincoln sat against a tree on the northeast White House lawn, while Baker lay on the ground with his hands behind his head. Willie Lincoln played in the leaves while the two men talked. Baker picked Willie up and kissed him before shaking the President's hand as he left. Mary Lincoln gave Baker a bouquet of flowers, which he accepted graciously and sadly: "Very beautiful. These flowers and my memory will wither together."

=== Death ===
On October 21, a false report of an unguarded Confederate camp at Ball's Bluff encouraged Brig. Gen. Charles Pomeroy Stone to order a raid, which clashed with enemy forces. Baker tried to reinforce the Union troops, but failed to ensure that there were enough boats for the river crossings, which were then delayed. At around four o’clock, Baker was struck by a volley of bullets through his heart and brain that killed him instantly. Wistar said that he and Baker had a brief discussion just prior to his being killed, and Baker said, "The officer who dies with his men will never be harshly judged."

==== Aftermath ====
President Lincoln was at General George McClellan's headquarters that evening when he got the news of Baker's death. Charles Carleton Coffin of the Boston Journal saw Lincoln crying when he received the news of Baker's death: "With bowed head, and tears rolling down his furrowed cheeks, his face pale and wan, his heart heaving with emotion, he almost fell as he stepped into the street." At Baker's funeral, Mary Todd Lincoln scandalized Washington by appearing in a lilac ensemble, including matching gloves and hat, rather than the traditional black. Despite Baker's close friendship with her husband, she retorted, "I wonder if the women of Washington expect me to muffle myself in mourning for every soldier killed in this great war?" After subsequent funerals in Philadelphia and New York City, Baker's body was sent by the steamer Northern Light and the Panama Railroad to San Francisco for burial. He is buried in Section OSD, Site 488, San Francisco National Cemetery. Of himself, Baker once said, "my real forte is my power to command, to rule and lead men. I feel that I could lead men anywhere." Baker's friends, however, thought his true talent lay in his gift of oratory.

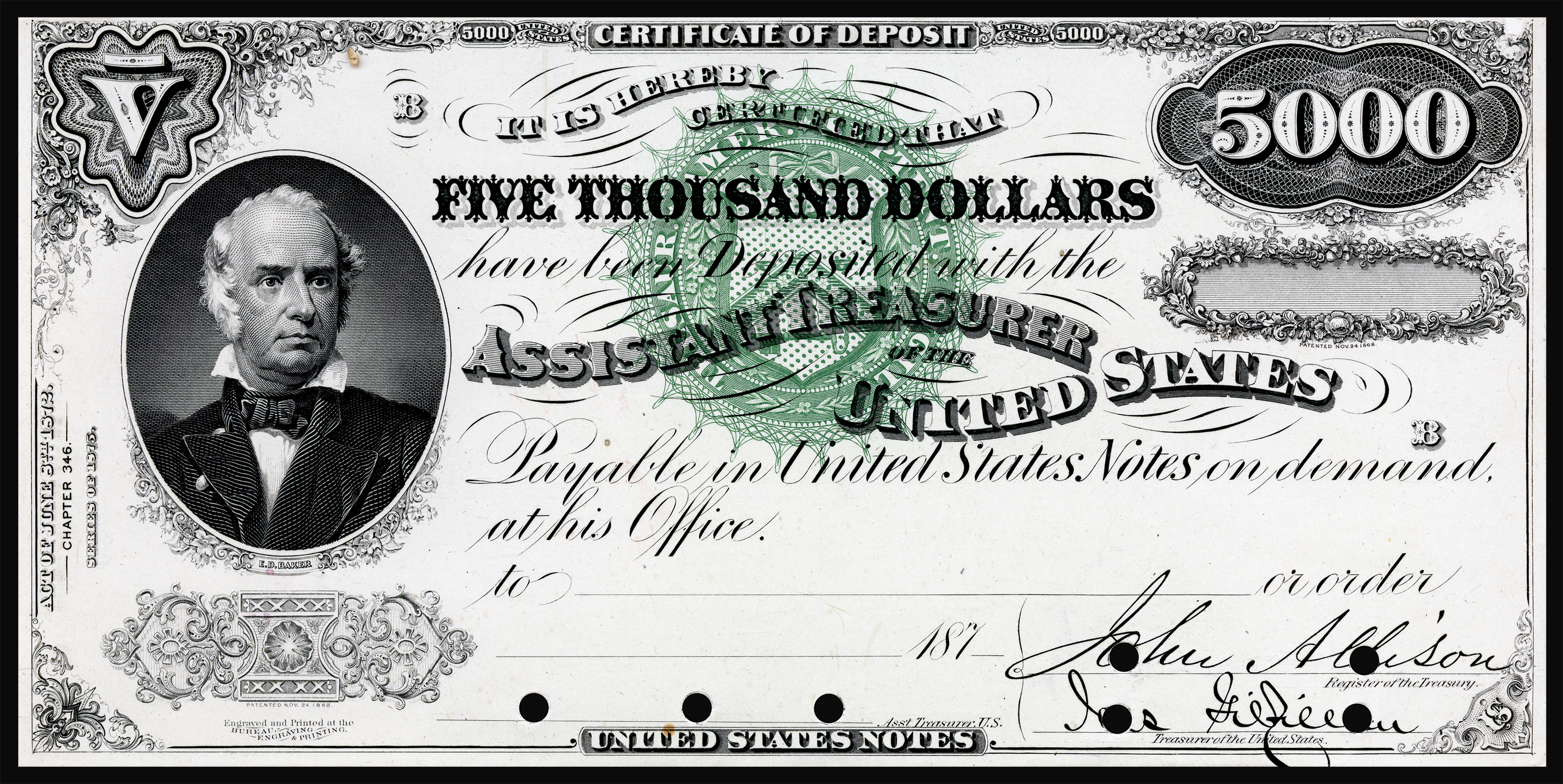
Baker depicted on the Series 1875 $5,000 Certificate of Deposit

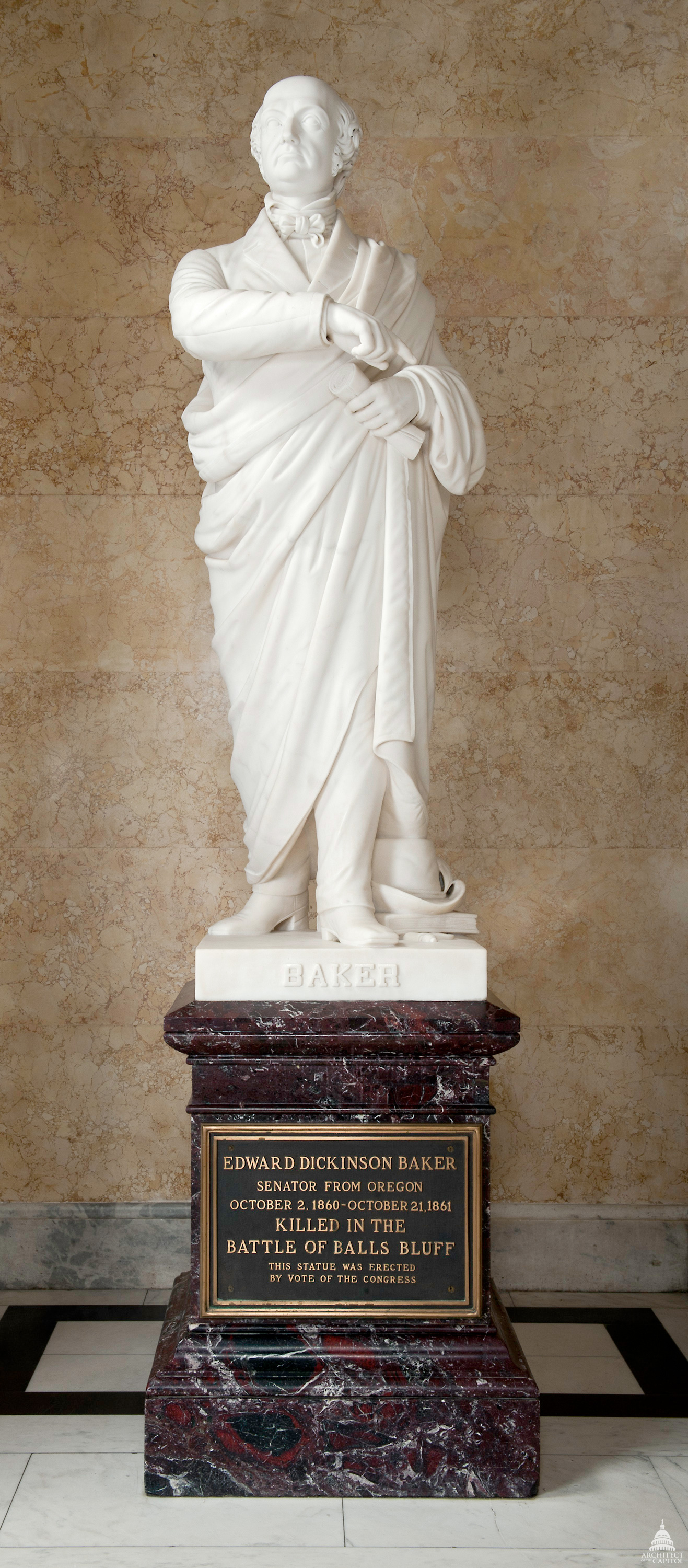
Baker's statue

His death shocked official Washington and led to the formation of the Congressional Joint Committee on the Conduct of the War. Almost three years after his death, Baker's widow, Mary Ann, was placed on the government pension roll, receiving $50 per month. The Congressional bill which provided this relief is also viewable at the Library of Congress website.

== Honors ==
- Baker City, Oregon and Baker County, Oregon, are named for him. The county was created on September 22, 1862.
- Fort Baker, located in the Las Vegas Valley of Nevada, was established in 1864 and named in his honor.
- On April 29, 1897, the Lime Point Military Reservation, located near Sausalito, California, was renamed Fort Baker in his honor.
- There is also a Fort Baker in the District of Columbia named for him. It is located between Forts Meigs and Stanton, one mile east of Uniontown at Fort Baker Drive and 30th Street.
- A life-size marble statue of Baker was sculpted by Horatio Stone and placed in the Capitol Building. The Congressional bills that provided $10,000 in funds for its creation are viewable at the Library of Congress website.
- On December 12, 1861, after the announcement of Baker's death, a resolution was submitted, by James W. Nesmith of Oregon, and passed which stated that Senate members would go into mourning by wearing crepe on their left arms for thirty days.
- There is a plaster carving of his face at the Illinois State Capitol building in Springfield, Illinois. It is located in the Legislative Reference Bureau legal library, carved into the wall.
- San Francisco's Baker Street, extending from Haight Street at Buena Vista Park, past the Palace of Fine Arts to the marina within the Golden Gate National Recreation Area at Marina Boulevard, is named after Baker.
- On May 19, 2011, Oregon Governor John Kitzhaber signed SB809 into law, designating each February 24 as Edward D. Baker Day in Oregon at the urging of local members of the Sons of Union Veterans of the Civil War.
- On October 23, 2011, the Oregon Civil War Sesquicentennial Commission held a special commemorative service honoring the life and public service of Baker in Salem, Oregon, held at the hour of his death at the Battle of Ball's Bluff, 150 years earlier. A simultaneous commemoration was held in Leesburg, Virginia.

== See also ==
- List of members of the United States Congress who died in office (1790–1899)
- List of members of the United States Congress killed or wounded in office
- List of American Civil War generals (Union)
- List of United States senators from Oregon
- Abraham Lincoln
- American Civil War

== Notes ==
U.S. House of Representatives
Preceded by John J. Hardin	Member of the U.S. House of Representatives from Illinois's 7th congressional district March 4, 1845 – January 15, 1847	Succeeded by John Henry
Preceded by Thomas J. Turner	Member of the U.S. House of Representatives from Illinois's 6th congressional district March 4, 1849 – March 3, 1851	Succeeded by Thompson Campbell
U.S. Senate
Preceded by Delazon Smith	U.S. Senator (Class 2) from Oregon; October 2, 1860 – October 21, 1861; Served alongside: Joseph Lane, James W. Nesmith	Succeeded by Benjamin Stark
