= Horatio Stone =

19th-century American sculptor, physician, and writer

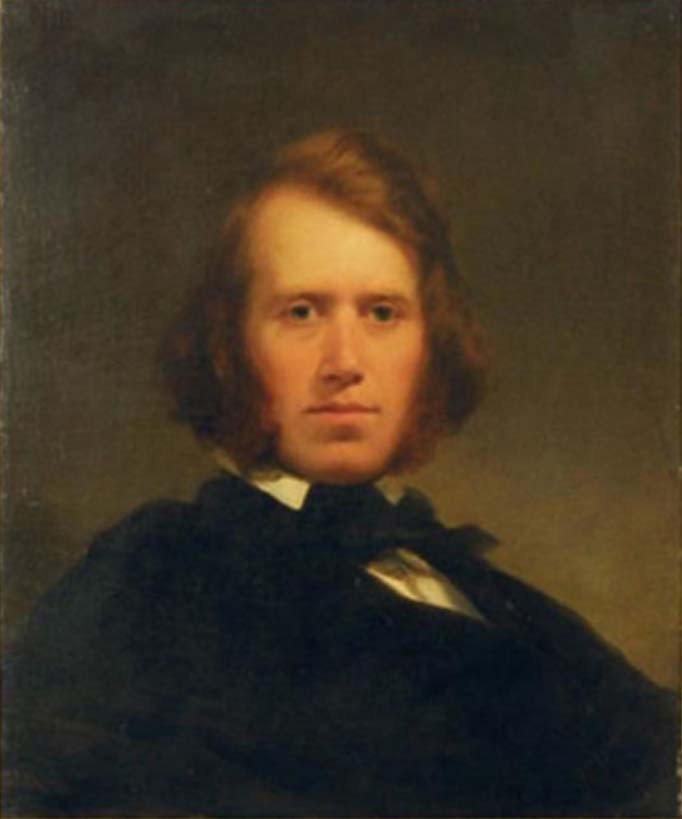
Horatio Stone (1845) by Charles Loring Elliott

Horatio Stone (December 25, 1808 – August 25, 1875), was an American sculptor, medical doctor, and writer. He is best remembered for his three statues in the U.S. Capitol.

== Life and career ==
Born in Jackson, New York, he was the eldest of the six children of Reuben and Nancy Fairchild Stone. In New York City, Stone attended the Columbian Academy of Painting under Archibald Robertson, and the American Academy of the Fine Arts under John Trumbull. At Trumbull's urging, Stone entered medical school for further study of human anatomy. He completed his medical training, and practiced as a physician from 1841 to 1847, prior to becoming a sculptor. His first major sculpture was a relief, The Three Marys at the Tomb, for his mother's grave.

Stone opened a sculpture studio in New York City in 1847, and moved to Washington, D.C. in 1848. During this time he executed portraits of Washington patrons, which were "good likenesses, but lacked any spark of life." In celebration of the French Revolution of 1848 and the establishment of the French Second Republic, Stone wrote "Hymn of Liberty," a collection of thirty poems. Composer George Henry Curtis (1821–1895) set these to music as the oratorio Eleutheria, which premiered in New York City in April 1849.

=== Landscape design ===
Showman P. T. Barnum purchased land in Bridgeport, Connecticut, to develop as Mountain Grove Cemetery (1849). Working with the cemetery's superintendent, Stone surveyed and designed its grounds. Stone laid out the initial design for Pittsfield Cemetery (1850), in Pittsfield, Massachusetts. Subsequent design work was done by the Olmsted Brothers, and others. Stone later wrote about the importance of placing works of art in cemeteries:

Such places furnish almost the only facilities, to a rural people, for seeing the higher illustrative works of art. By exercising our ability for superior expenditure in a direction that will increase the number of such works, we shall at the same time elevate their sentiments and advance our own. In every structure, whether of great or small cost, let the spirit of design and the soul of sentiment manifest themselves, and then our cemeteries will be visited, not for the recreation of the drive only, but for the divine lessons they inculcate, and the sacred aspirations they inspire.

=== Arts advocate ===
Stone was co-founder of the Washington Art Association in 1856, and served as president until its dissolution in 1861. In response to the association's advocacy, President James Buchanan created a National Arts Commission in 1859, a panel of experts to advise Congress on selecting artwork for federal buildings. Congress refused to provide funding for the commission, and it was disbanded after less than two years. Sculptor Henry Kirke Brown praised the efforts of his fellow commission member: "This Stone has been for the last eight years a sort of martyr to the cause of art in Washington, through poverty, neglect and scorn he has urged increasing the claim of American artists to the consideration and patronage of the government." Stone was also instrumental in the 1860 founding of the National Gallery of Art.

=== Civil War ===
Stone worked as a contract surgeon during the Civil War, 1862-1865, initially at the military hospital set up in the United States Patent Office, in Washington, D.C. There he treated wounded from the Second Battle of Bull Run, Antietam, and Fredericksburg. Poet Walt Whitman was a volunteer nurse:

In the Patent Office Hospital, Dr. Stone,– (Horatio Stone the sculptor—in his ward, some 150 men—he has been surgeon here several months—has had successive changes of soldiers in [his] charge—some bad wounds, of course—amputation, sometimes rapidly followed by death, &c.—others from fevers, &c. &c.)—he told me last evening that he had not in memory one single case of a man's meeting the approach of death, whether sudden or slow, with fear or trembling—but always of these young men meeting their death with steady composure, and often with curious readiness—

=== U.S. Capitol ===
==== Statues ====
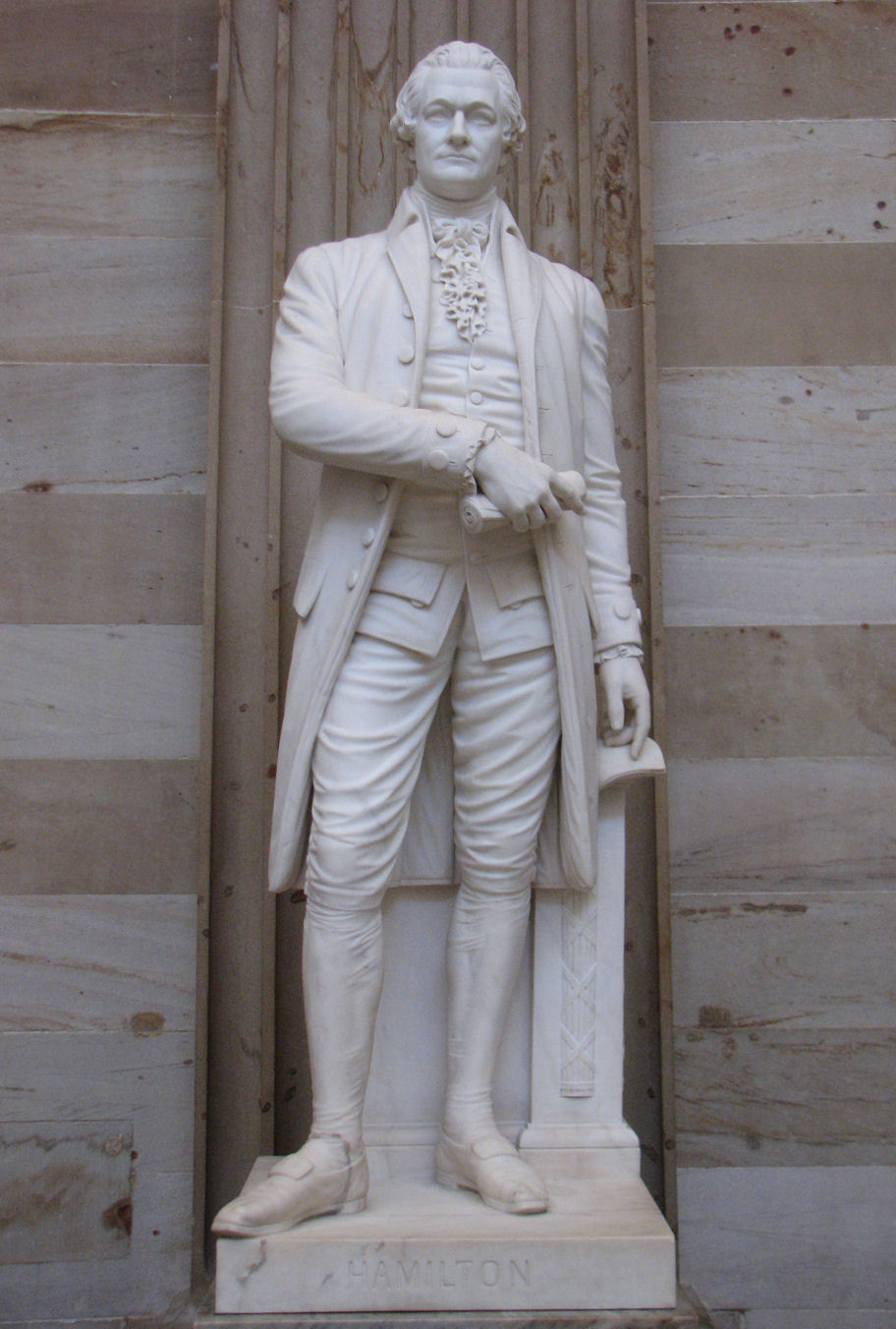
Alexander Hamilton (1866-1868), Rotunda, U.S. Capitol

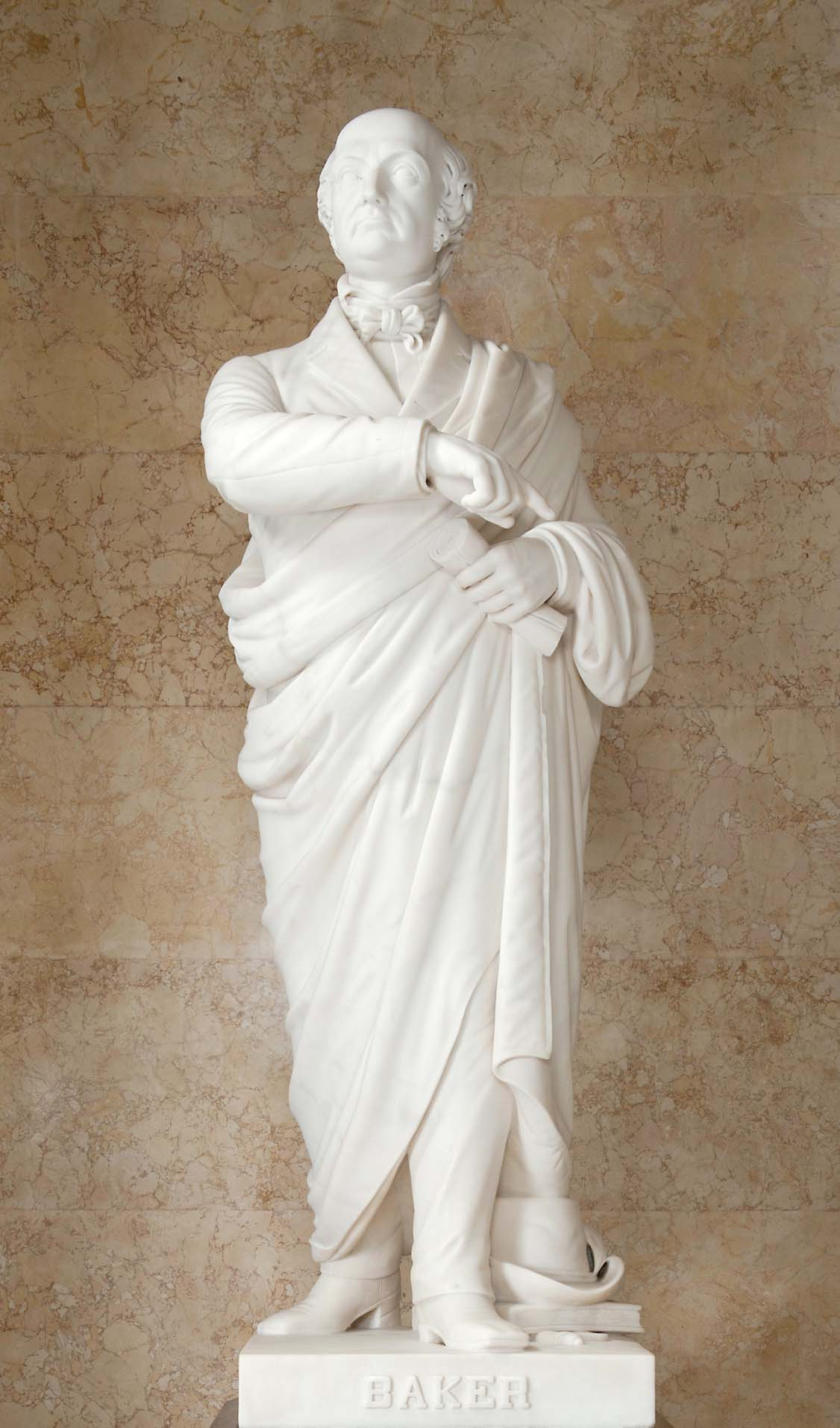
Edward Dickinson Baker (1873-1876), Hall of Columns, U.S. Capitol

Congress awarded Stone three statue commissions for the U.S. Capitol: John Hancock, Alexander Hamilton, and Edward Dickinson Baker. An 1870 Report to Congress praised his first two works:

On the 18th day of August, 1865, Congress appropriated $20,000 for works of art to decorate the Capitol, to be expended under the Joint Committee of the Library; and in July, 1866, appropriated a further sum of $5,000 for a similar purpose, to be expended under the direction of the same committee. With these appropriations the following works of art were purchased: …

No. 25, A statue of Hancock, by Dr. Horatio Stone, an American, $5,500.
No. 26, Statue of Hamilton, by Dr. Horatio Stone, American, $10,000. …

Mr. Stone's statues of Hancock and Hamilton are the only works of any real value purchased out of the appropriation referred to above. His Hamilton is remarkably fine; and it is worthy of notice here that these works, costing so little in comparison with others purchased by the government, should be so much more valuable for their artistic merit. It is also to the credit of Mr. Stone that he filled his contract promptly, according to the agreement, and has not called on Congress for extra compensation.

Senator Edward Dickinson Baker of Oregon was the only sitting U.S. lawmaker to die in the Civl War. He had served alongside Abraham Lincoln in the Illinois legislature, and also in the U.S. Congress. (Lincoln named his son Eddie for him.) Baker served as a colonel in the 1846-1848 Mexican-American War and, after losing re-election to Congress, opened a law office in San Francisco in 1852. A vacancy opened in one of Oregon's U.S. Senate seats in 1859. At the urging of a group of Oregon Republicans, Baker moved to Portland in February 1860, and the state legislature elected him to the U.S. Senate in October. At the onset of the Civil War, he was offered a commission as brigadier-general of volunteers for the Union Army, but declined the honor. Preferring to be in the fight, he resumed his rank as colonel, and recruited and led the "California Regiment." This was composed of volunteers, mostly from Philadelphia and New York City, who were funded by and fought in the place of potential recruits from the West Coast. Baker was killed early in the war, in the October 21, 1861 Battle of Ball's Bluff.

Stone was moved by the death of such a brave and dynamic man, and within months modeled a maquette for a statue of him. It depicted him in modern dress, but wrapped in a cloak that evoked a Roman toga. Stone conceived the statue as the crowning figure for a triumphal arch in Baker's memory, to be erected in Lone Mountain Cemetery, opposite San Francisco. It was never built.

More than a decade after Baker's death, Congress appropriated $10,000 for a statue, and awarded the commission to Stone in 1873. The plaster of Stone's Baker statue was not greeted with the unanimous acclaim of his Hamilton statue:

[N]earer and dearer to the hearts of today must be the image of "the noblest Roman of them all." It is a statue of Baker, also executed by Horatio Stone, in Rome, in 1863 [sic]. Hamilton stands forth in heroic size, while the statue of Baker is under that of life, and barely suggests the grand proportions of the man. Yet the dignity and grandeur of his mien are here, as he stands wrapped in his cloak, his arms folded, his head thrown back, his noble face lifted as if he saw the future—his future—and awaited it undaunted and with a joyful heart.

Stone died at Carrara, Italy, in August 1875. Italian carvers posthumously completed his Baker statue, and it was installed in the U.S. Capitol in 1876.

==== Federal vases ====
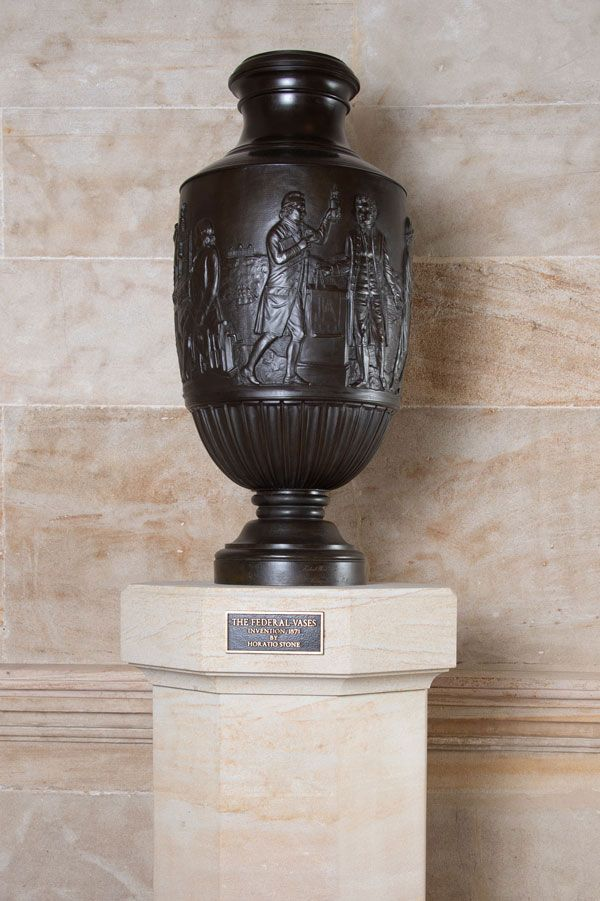
Invention Vase (1871), East Vestibule, U.S. Capitol

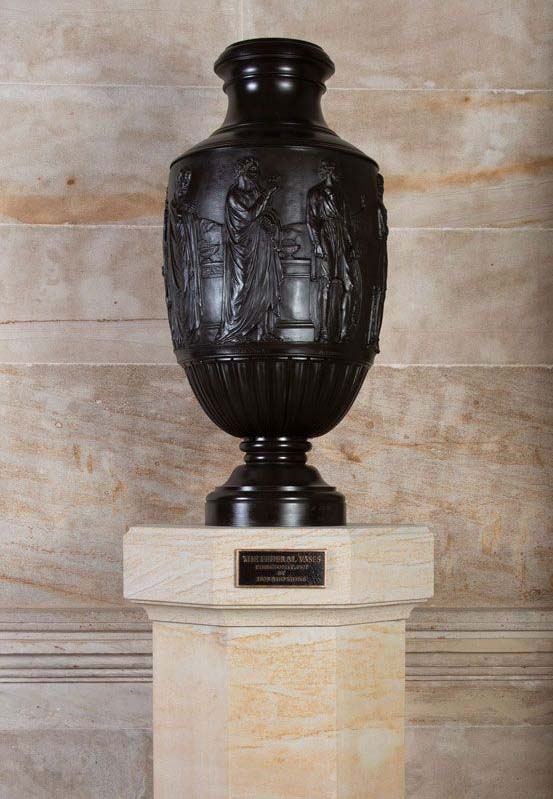
Philosophy Vase (1871), East Vestibule, U.S. Capitol

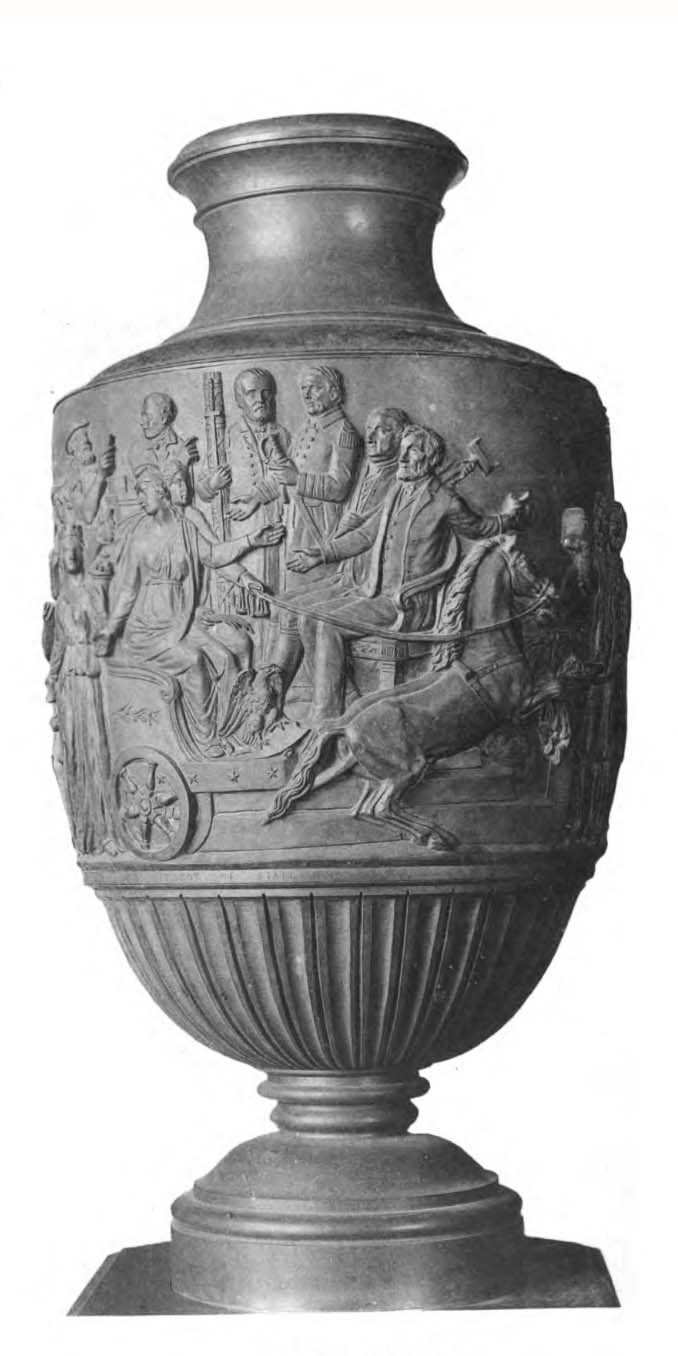
Republic Vase (1871), Benton Museum of Art

To memorialize the preservation of the American Republic following the Civil War, in 1870 Congress appropriated $10,000 for the creation of a work of art for the Rotunda of the U.S. Capitol. Stone proposed a set of three heroic-sized bronze vases, decorated with vignettes from American history. He was awarded the commission, and modeled the vases in Italy. Stone returned to the United States in 1871, and his plaster models were cast in bronze by the Robert Wood Foundry in Philadelphia. Soon after this, it was discovered that Stone had failed to return his signed contract for the commission, and the money appropriated by Congress had reverted to the U.S. Treasury. He turned to art patron John Chipman Hoadley, who paid Stone's expenses, and the pair of smaller vases were installed (on loan) in the newly-built House of Representatives Chamber. Ownership of the three vases reverted to Hoadley after Stone's 1875 death, and they may have been among the bronze vases by Stone posthumously exhibited at the 1876 Centennial Exposition in Philadelphia.

"The largest of the vases, which is about five feet in height, represents the two great events in the history of the republic—its inauguration in 1789, with numerous historical figures of that period; and the preservation of the republic at the termination of the great rebellion—by representations of the great names connected with the events of that time."

Following Hoadley's 1886 death, members of the Boston Art Club purchased the three federal vases through subscription, and presented them to that institution in 1887. The pair of smaller vases, Philosophy and Invention, were sold to a private buyer in 1939. The larger Republic vase was also sold, and is now in the collection of Pomona College's Benton Museum of Art, in Claremont, California.

The Philosophy and Invention vases were auctioned at Christie's New York in January 2012, and realized $62,500 (plus buyer's premium). They are currently on long-term loan to the U.S. Capitol.

A Stone obituary listed a marble version of each of the smaller vases, but these remain unlocated.

=== Samuel Morse monument ===
Stone had modeled a c.1854 bust of Samuel Morse, inventor of the telegraph, who became an advocate for the sculptor's work. Even prior to Morse's 1872 death, Stone proposed a colossal bronze statue of Morse for Washington, D.C. The project would have been the most ambitious of Stone's career, but was never executed:

The National monument to Prof. Morse consists of a statue of Prof. Morse, 12 ft. [(3.65 m)] in height, surmounting a cylindrical shaft and octagonal base 24 feet [(7.3 m)] in height, enriched with numerous sculptures illustrative of the invention of the electro-magnetic telegraph. In the frieze are represented in low relief the capitals and other characteristic specimens of the architecture of Europe, Asia, Africa and America, over which are suspended the telegraph wires.

=== Personal ===
Stone never married. During the Civil War, he published Freedom (1864), a book of patriotic poetry. He traveled to California to lecture in early 1875.

Stone sailed for Europe in May 1875. The ship's passengers were warned of cholera outbreaks in Italy, but he planned to travel to Rome, and "ridiculed the idea of its being any more sickly there than in any other city." The New York Times reported on July 14: "Horatio Stone, the sculptor, who has the commission for a statue of Gen. E.D. Baker, to be placed in the United States Capitol, is now at Carrara, Italy, superintending the work upon the marble." Stone died at Carrara, on August 25.

==== Obituary ====
HORATIO STONE. — Dr. Stone, as he was popularly called, the well-known sculptor, of Washington City, died at Carrara, Italy, early in September [sic]. He was a native of New England, and in early life studied medicine, and practiced as a physician in New York for many years. In 1846, when in the latter city, he began to model in clay. He had previously written verses, but never acquired much fame as a poet. He showed considerable skill as a modeler in clay, however, and was encouraged to continue the work. In 1848, or about that year, he went to Washington, and from that time devoted his whole attention to sculpture. During Dr. Stone's residence in Washington, and between the years 1850 and 1860, he produced several life-size portrait-busts of Chief-Justice Taney and Senator Thomas H. Benton. He shortly afterwards executed marble statues of Mr. Benton and John Hancock. The latter is in the Senate-Chamber. In 1856, Dr. Stone visited Italy, and on his return home, a few years later, he executed several ideal heads and portrait-busts. One of his greatest efforts in sculpture was a design for a colossal statue of Professor Morse, but the work was never finished. In 1870, while on a visit to New York, he made a model for a statue of Dr. Harvey, the discoverer of the circulation of blood. The last and most important work which engaged his attention was a model for the Farragut statue ordered by Congress, but he was an unsuccessful applicant for the commission. Dr. Stone was very enthusiastic in his nature, and had he given his attention earlier to the study of his art under a competent master, he might have achieved lasting fame. He was sixty-five years [sic] of age. — The Art Journal, London, November 1875

== Selected works ==
=== Statues ===
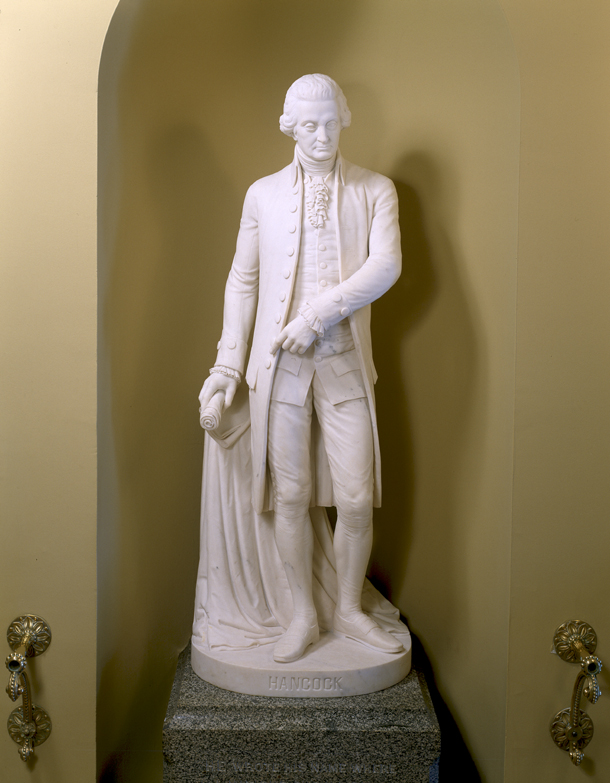
John Hancock (1857-1861), Western Stairway, U.S. Capitol

- Statue of John Hancock (marble, 1857-1861), Western Stairway, Senate Wing, U.S. Capitol, Washington, D.C. Originally placed in the Senate Chamber
  - A 1915 bronze relief bust of Hancock, based on Stone's statue (sculptor unknown), is in Doric Hall, Massachusetts State House, Boston.
- Statue of Sen. Thomas Hart Benton (marble, c.1860), unlocated
  - A plaster version of the Benton statue was in Stone's studio at the time of his death.
- Statue of Alexander Hamilton (marble, 1866-1868), Rotunda, U.S. Capitol, Washington, D.C.
- Statue of Dr. William Harvey (marble, 1870), unlocated
- Statue of Faith (bronze, c.1870), Annunciation of the Blessed Virgin Mary Roman Catholic Church, Williamsburg, Brooklyn
- Statue of Edward Dickinson Baker (marble, 1873-1876), Hall of Columns, U.S. Capitol, Washington, D.C.
  - Another marble example is in the Corcoran Gallery of Art.
- Statue of Uncle Sam ’76 (marble, year), unlocated
- Statue of Uncle Sam ’76 (bronze, year), unlocated
- Thomas Jefferson Holding the Declaration of Independence (marble, year), height: 39.5 in (100 cm)
- Statue of Corinne at Rome (medium, year), unlocated
- Statue of Beatrice Unveiling to Dante (medium, year), unlocated

=== Portrait busts ===
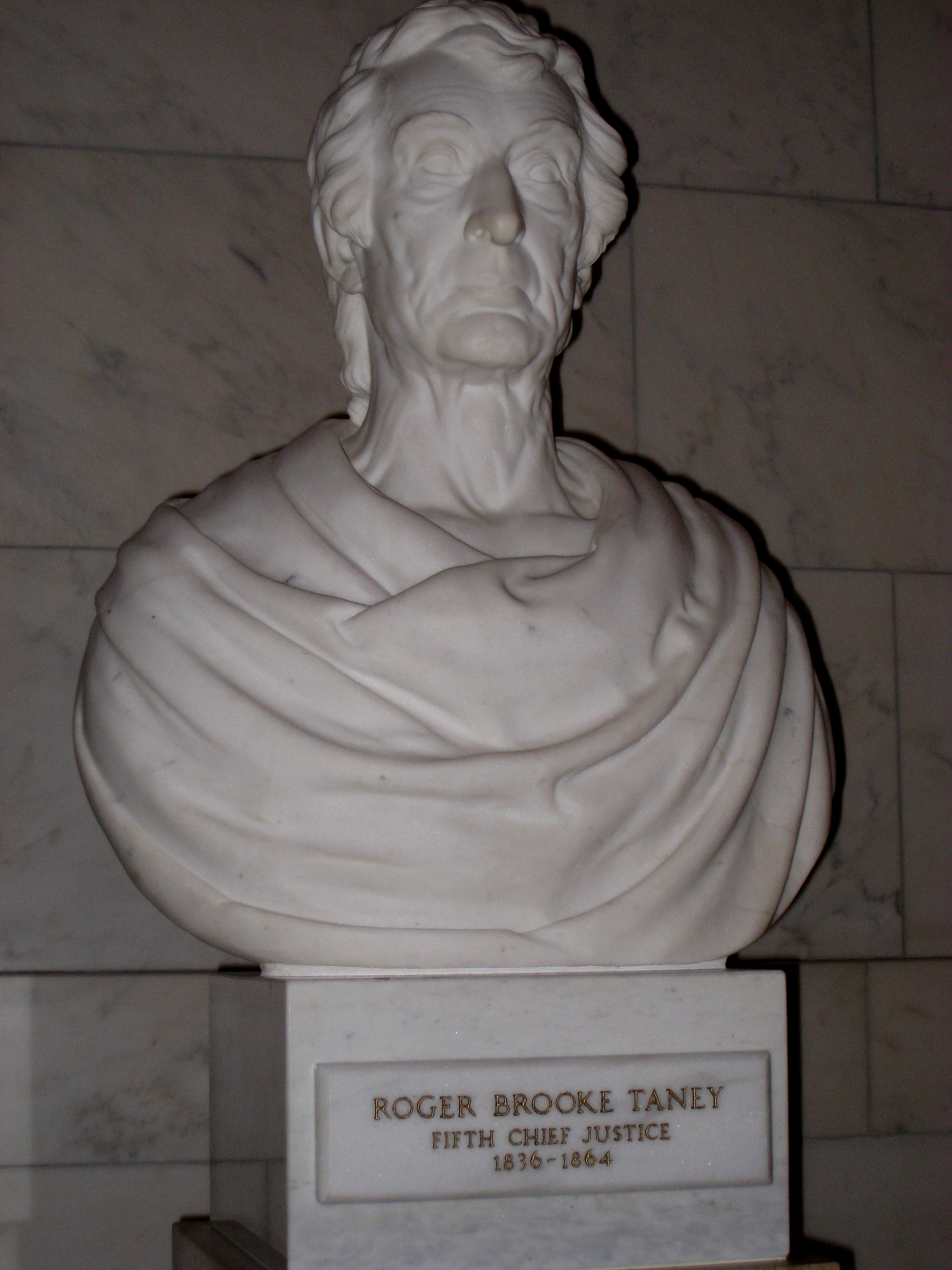
Bust of Justice Roger B. Taney (1853), U.S. Supreme Court

- Bust of Justice Roger B. Taney (marble, 1853), U.S. Supreme Court, Washington, D.C.
  - A 1977 bronze cast is in the collection of the National Portrait Gallery.
- Bust of Justice Samuel Nelson (marble, 1854), New York Bar Association
- Bust of Samuel Morse (marble, c.1854), unlocated.
- Bust of Sen. Thomas Hart Benton (marble, c.1858)
- Bust of a Roman Woman (marble, 1860)
- Bust of Alexander Hamilton (marble, 1867), height: 30 in (76 cm), A New York Library
- Bust of Moses (marble, 1867), height: 29.5 in (75 cm)
- Bust of Dr. William Harvey (marble, 1869), height: 29.5 in (75 cm), Jefferson Medical College, Philadelphia, Pennsylvania
- Bust of Beatrice di Dante (marble, 1869)
- Bust of Frederick P. Stanton (marble, 1869), Kansas State Historical Society, Topeka, Kansas
- Bust of Corinne (medium, year), Union League of New York

=== Relief works ===
- The Three Marys at the Tomb (marble, c.1849), Fairchild-Stone monument, Coulter Cemetery, Jackson, New York
- Ascension Reliefs (medium, c.1859), Lanman-Foster monument, Yantic Cemetery, Norwich, Connecticut
- Portrait bust of Colonel Francis Washburn (marble, 1869), Memorial Hall, Harvard University, Cambridge, Massachusetts. The oval relief panel is located on the west wall of the dining hall.
- Portrait bust of Justice Roger B. Taney (medium, year), unlocated

==== Federal vases ====
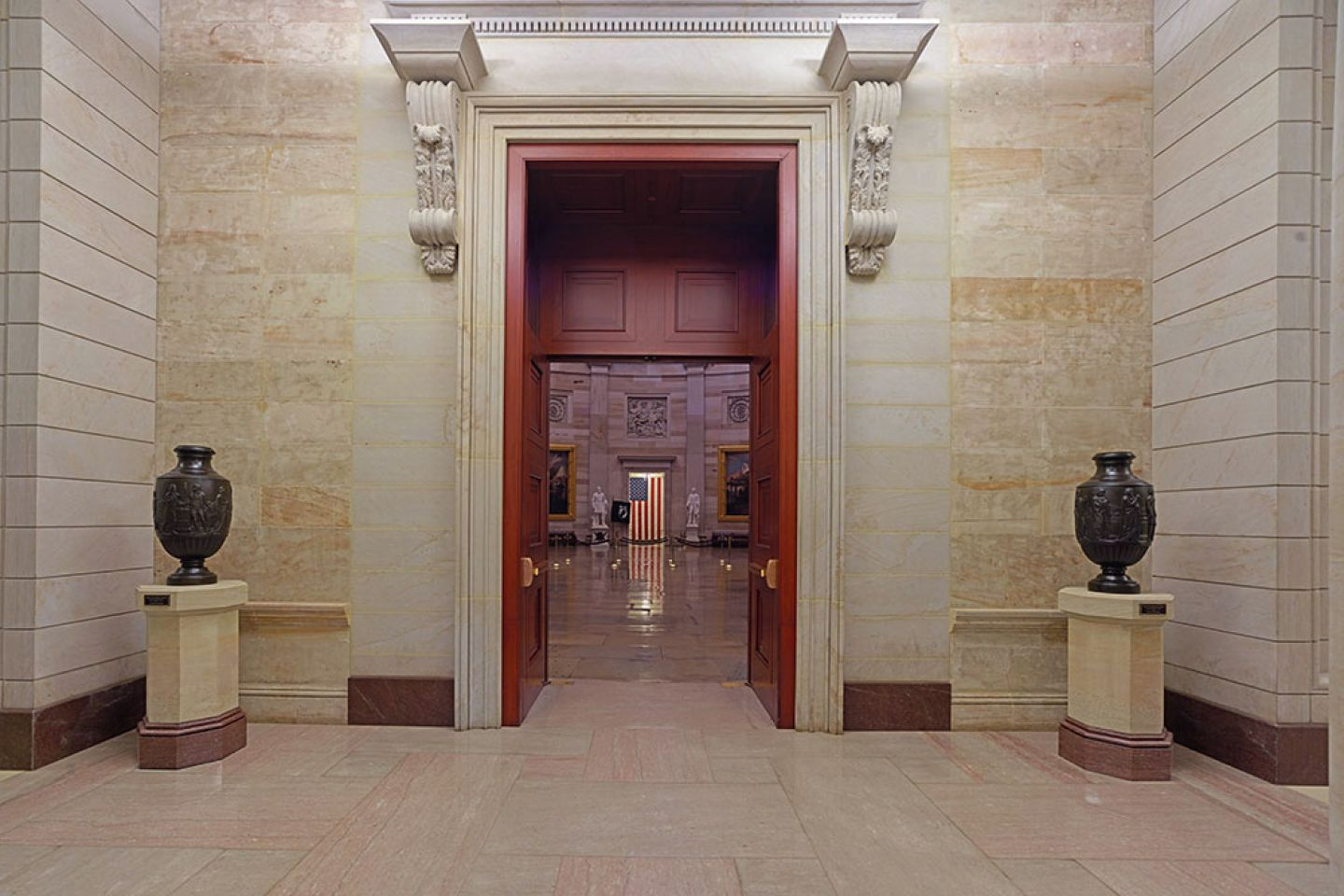
Federal Vases (1868-1871), in East Vestibule of U.S. Capitol

- Philosophy Vase (Ecce Homo), (bronze, 1868-1871), height: 34.5 in (88 cm), East Vestibule, U.S. Capitol, Washington, D.C.
  - A marble version was listed in a Stone obituary.
- Invention Vase (Freedom), (bronze, 1868-1871), height: 34.5 in (88 cm), East Vestibule, U.S. Capitol, Washington, D.C.
  - A marble version was listed in a Stone obituary.
- Republic Vase (bronze, 1868-1871), height: 48 in (120 cm), Benton Museum of Art, Pomona College, Claremont, California.
