= Charles Kochersperger =

Lieutenant Colonel Charles Kochersperger (1826–1867) was a Union Army officer with the 71st Pennsylvania Infantry Volunteers Regiment. He was the unit's second-in-command at the 1863 Battle of Gettysburg and its commander at the 1864 Battle of the Wilderness.

Kochersperger was born in Philadelphia, Pennsylvania, on February 8, 1826, the eldest son of Charles Kochersperger by his wife Jane, née McDonnell. He was married there on July 4, 1849, to Sarah Ann Bozorth of the same place.

In 1855, he purchased a private mail delivery company, Blood's Penny Post, which issued its own postage stamps and competed directly with the United States Postal Service. It would eventually be shut down by a Supreme Court of the United States decision.

In 1861, he enlisted with the 71st Pennsylvania Volunteers Regiment. He rose to second-in-command by Gettysburg and full command for the Wilderness, where he was severely wounded. Kochersperger died from the long-term effects of his war wounds in Philadelphia on December 27, 1867, and was buried on Dec. 29 at the city's Odd Fellows Cemetery, now defunct.

His widow survived him by 45 years, dying in Darby, Pennsylvania, on April 14, 1912.
