= John Henry (Illinois politician) =

United States politician (1800–1882)

Member of the U.S. House of Representatives from Illinois's 7th district
- In office February 5, 1847 – March 3, 1847
- Preceded by: Edward D. Baker
- Succeeded by: Abraham Lincoln

Member of the Illinois Senate
- In office 1840-1847

Member of the Illinois House of Representatives
- In office 1832-1840

Personal details
- Born: November 1, 1800 Stanford, Kentucky, U.S.
- Died: April 28, 1882 (aged 81) St. Louis, Missouri, U.S.
- Resting place: Bellefontaine Cemetery, St. Louis, Missouri, U.S.
- Party: Whig
- Occupation: Congressman, Superintendent of Illinois state asylum
- Profession: Politician

Military service
- Allegiance: United States
- Branch/service: United States Army
- Years of service: 1832; August 25, 1862 - April 30, 1863
- Rank: Private
- Unit: Illinois Volunteer Regiment; Quartermaster’s Department, Jackson, Tennennessee

John Henry (November 1, 1800 – April 28, 1882) was a U.S. representative from Illinois.

Born near Stanford, Kentucky, Henry attended the public schools. He served as a private in Captain Arnett's company of Illinois volunteers in the Black Hawk War. He served as a member of the State House of Representatives 1832–1840. He was prominently associated with the first railway being constructed in Illinois in 1838. He served as a member of the State Senate from 1840 to 1847. Following this, he served as the superintendent for the Illinois state insane asylum located in Jacksonville, Illinois.

Henry was elected as a Whig to the Twenty-ninth Congress to fill the vacancy caused by the resignation of Edward D. Baker and served from February 5, 1847, to March 3, 1847. He was succeeded as Congressman by future president of the United States Abraham Lincoln. He was not a candidate for the Thirtieth Congress. He was superintendent of the state insane asylum at Jacksonville, Illinois from 1850 to 1855. During the Civil War, he was connected with the Quartermaster's Department at Jackson, Tennessee, from August 25, 1862, to April 30, 1863. He died on April 28, 1882, in St. Louis, Missouri, and was interred at Bellefontaine Cemetery.

U.S. House of Representatives
Preceded by Vacant	Member of the U.S. House of Representatives from Illinois's 7th congressional district February 5, 1847 – March 3, 1847	Succeeded by Abraham Lincoln
