= Kathleen Moore =

American lighthouse keeper (c.1794/1812–1899)

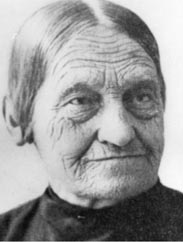
- Served as a lighthouse keeper for over half a century
- Born: c. 1794 – c. 1812
- Died: 1899
- Military career
- Branch: United States Lighthouse Service

Kathleen Moore (c. 1794 – c. 1812 – 1899), also known as Catherine Moore, Kathleen A. Moore, Kathleen Andre Moore, Kate Moore, and Catherine A. Moore, was a lighthouse keeper. She was employed by the United States Lighthouse Service, which was a precursor agency to the United States Coast Guard.

Moore served at the Black Rock Harbor Light on Fayerweather Island in Long Island Sound for over half a century, beginning when she helped her father as a twelve-year-old. She is credited with saving 23 lives.

According to Moore: "Sometimes there were more than two hundred sailing vessels at night, and some nights there were as many as three or four wrecks." Moore's duties included keeping the light lit during stormy weather, and nursing shipwrecked sailors back to health. She retired in 1878. She died in 1899 and was buried in an unmarked grave at Mountain Grove Cemetery in Bridgeport.

== Recognition ==
In 2010, the Coast Guard decided that all the new Sentinel-class cutters would be named after Coast Guard personnel who were recognized for heroism. Accordingly, Moore was one of those honored, and the ninth cutter in the class was named the USCGC Kathleen Moore. Built at Bollinger Shipyards, the cutter is homeported in Key West, Florida. Bollinger delivered the vessel to the Coast Guard for pre-commissioning testing on March 28, 2014.

A grave marker was dedicated to Moore at Mountain Grove Cemetery in 2014, shortly before the commissioning of the ship in her name. The gravestone provided by Bollinger Shipyards quotes John 8:12 and lists her name as "Kathleen A. Moore" and her birth year as "circa 1812".
