= Statue of Alexander Hamilton (U.S. Capitol) =

Statue by Horatio Stone

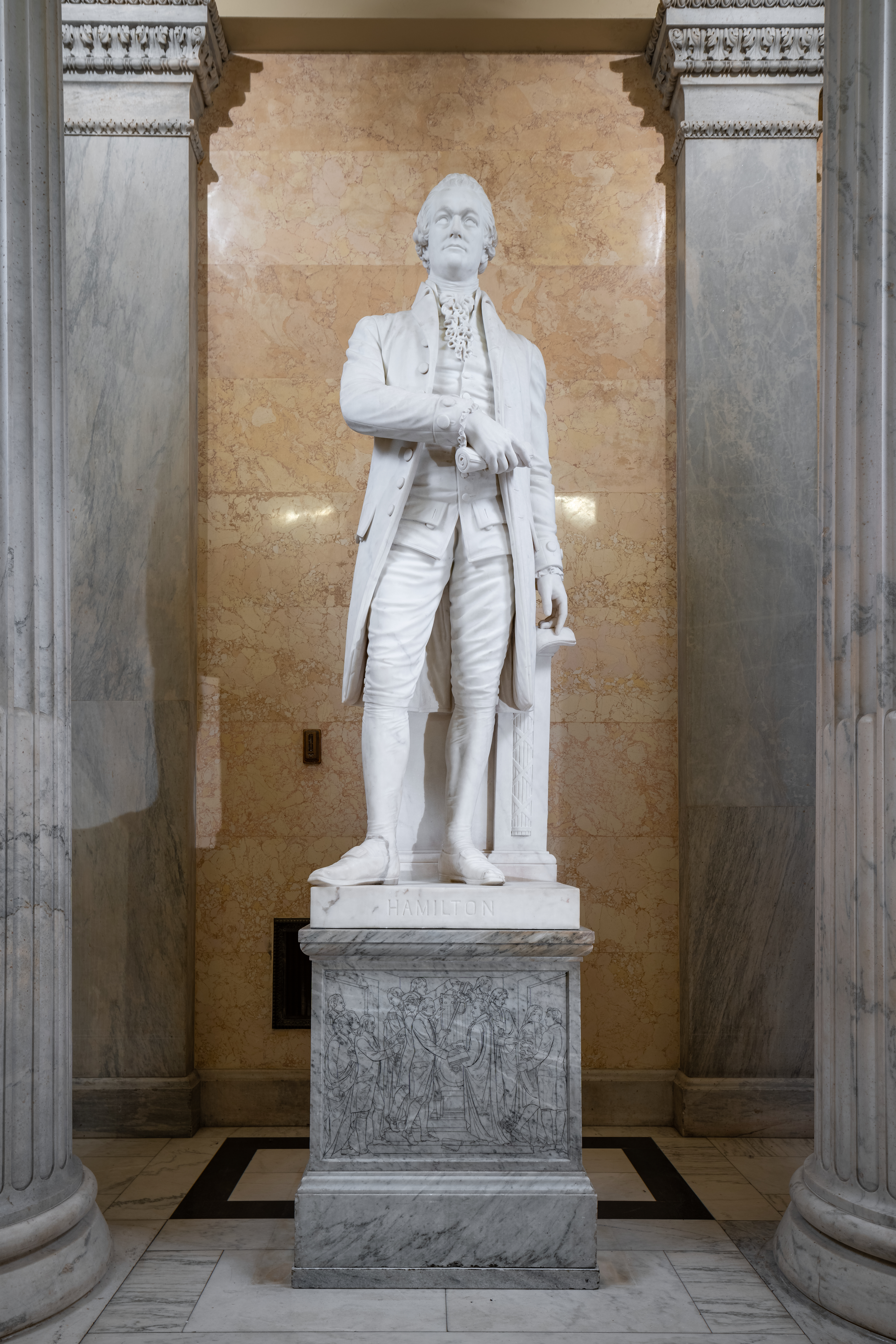
- The statue at the Hall of Columns in 2023
- Artist: Horatio Stone
- Subject: Alexander Hamilton
- Location: Washington, D.C., U.S.

An 1868 marble statue of Alexander Hamilton by Horatio Stone is installed in the United States Capitol in Washington, D.C.
