= Statue of Edward Dickinson Baker =

Sculpture in the US Capital, Washington, D.C.

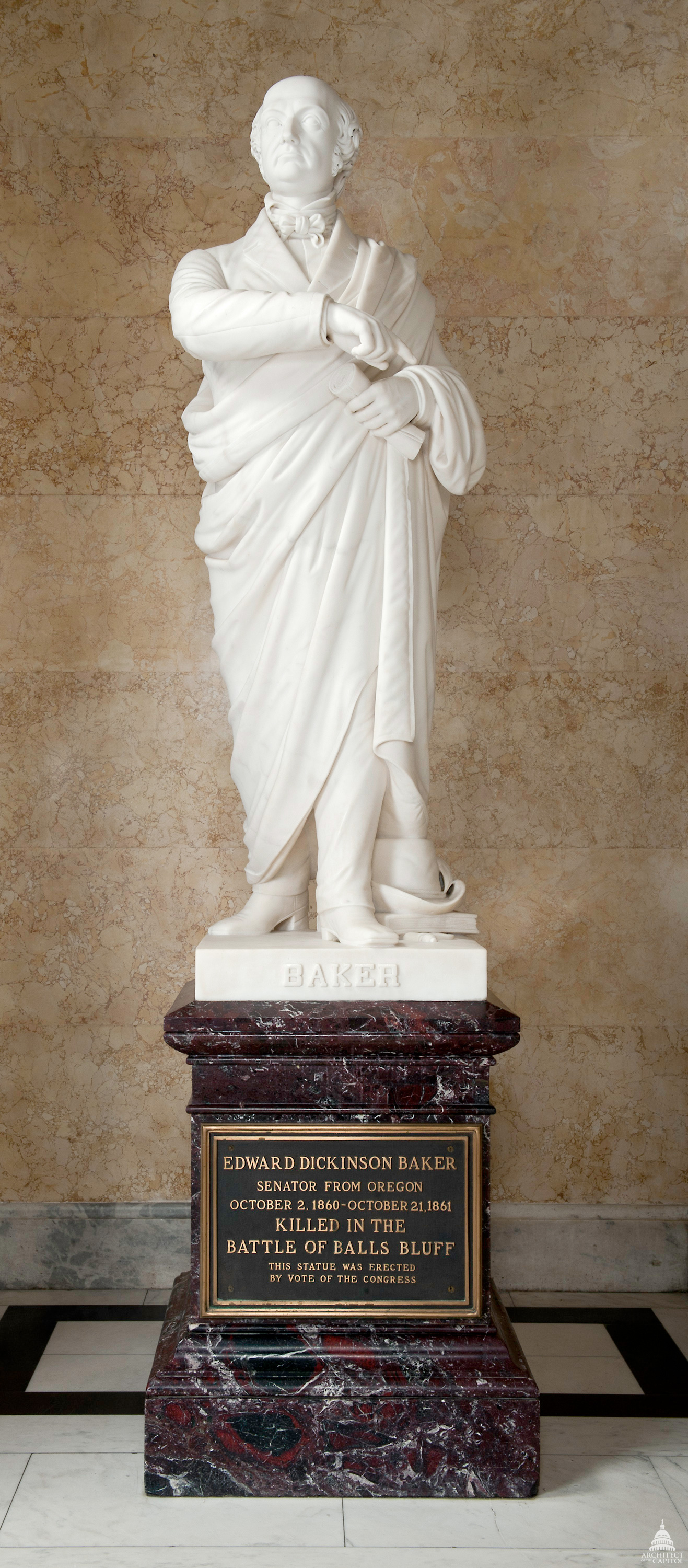
- The statue in 2011
- Artist: Horatio Stone
- Year: 1876
- Medium: Marble sculpture
- Subject: Edward Dickinson Baker
- Location: Washington, D.C., U.S.

A 1876 marble sculpture of Edward Dickinson Baker by Horatio Stone is installed in the United States Capitol's Hall of Columns, in Washington, D.C. Baker was the only U.S. senator ever to die in combat.
