= USCGC Kathleen Moore =

United States Coast Guard vessel

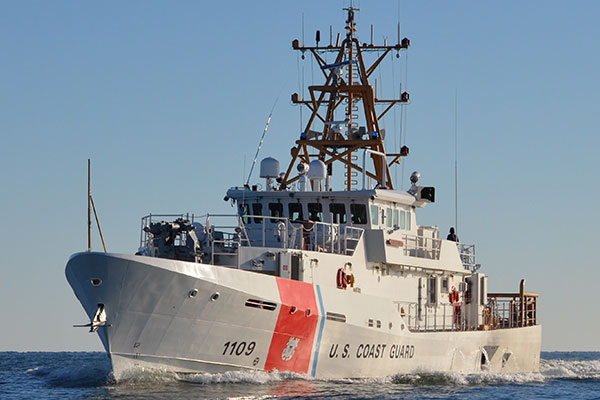
- Kathleen Moore, underway.

History

United States
- Name: Kathleen Moore
- Namesake: Kathleen Moore
- Operator: United States Coast Guard
- Builder: Bollinger Shipyards, Lockport, Louisiana
- Launched: 28 March 2014
- Acquired: 28 March 2014
- Commissioned: 10 May 2014
- Home port: Key West, Florida
- Identification: MMSI number: 338926409; Callsign: NDVB; Hull number: WPC-1109
- Motto: Honor the legacy
- Status: in active service
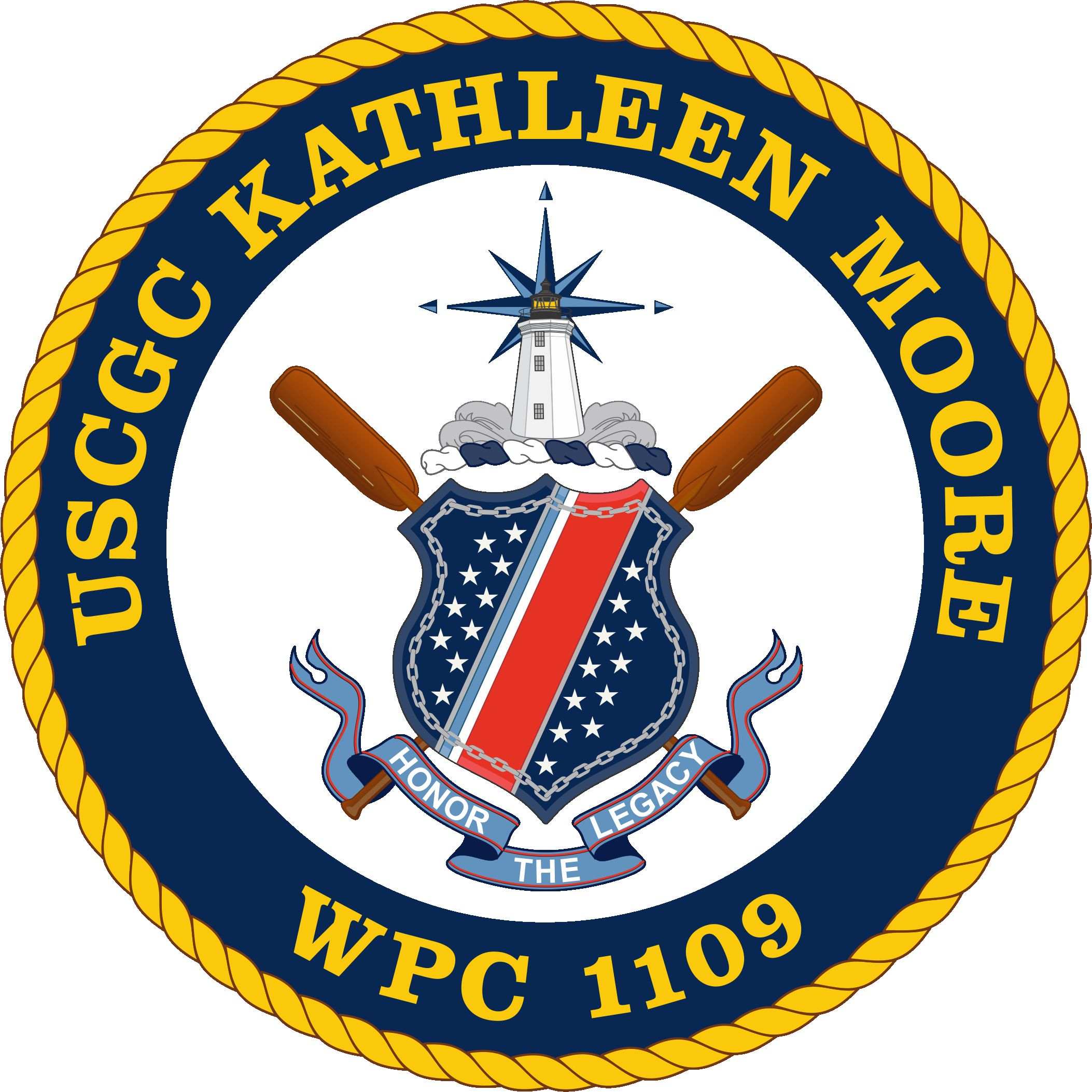
- Badge

General characteristics
- Class & type: Sentinel-class cutter
- Displacement: 353 long tons (359 t)
- Length: 46.8 m (154 ft)
- Beam: 8.11 m (26.6 ft)
- Depth: 2.9 m (9.5 ft)
- Propulsion: 2 × 4,300 kW (5,800 shp); 1 × 75 kW (101 shp) bow thruster
- Speed: 28 kn (52 km/h; 32 mph)
- Range: 2,500 nmi (4,600 km; 2,900 mi)
- Endurance: 5 days
- Boats & landing craft carried: 1 × Short Range Prosecutor RHIB
- Complement: 2 officers, 20 crew
- Sensors & processing systems: L-3 C4ISR suite
- Armament: 1 × Mk 38 Mod 2 25 mm automatic gun; 4 × crew-served Browning M2 machine guns

USCGC Kathleen Moore is the ninth Sentinel-class cutter by Bollinger shipyards delivered to the United States Coast Guard. She was delivered to the Coast Guard, for pre-commissioning testing, on 28 March 2014.

The first six cutters are home-ported in Miami, Florida. The second six cutters, including Kathleen Moore, will be home-ported in Key West, Florida. The 58 cutters will replace the Island-class cutters, and together with the smaller Marine Protector-class cutters, will perform the Coast Guard's main offshore patrol duties.

== Design ==
The Sentinel-class cutters were designed to replace the shorter 110-foot (34 m) Island class. Kathleen Moore is equipped with a remote-control 25 mm (0.98 in) Bushmaster autocannon and four, crew-served M2HB .50-caliber machine guns. The ship has a bow thruster for maneuvering in crowded anchorages and channels. Kathleen Moore also has small underwater fins for coping with the rolling and pitching caused by large waves. The class is equipped with a stern launching ramp, like the Marine Protector class and the eight failed expanded Island-class cutters. The cutter has a complement of twenty-two crew members. Like the Marine Protector class, and the cancelled extended Island-class cutters, the Sentinel-class cutters deploy the Short Range Prosecutor rigid-hulled inflatable boat (SRP or RHIB) in rescues and interceptions. According to Marine Log, modifications to the Coast Guard vessels from the Stan 4708 design include an increase in speed from 23 to 28 knots (43 to 52 km/h; 26 to 32 mph), fixed-pitch rather than variable-pitch propellers, stern launch capability, and watertight bulkheads.

Kathleen Moore has an overall length of 153 feet 6 inches (46.79 m), a beam of 25 feet (7.6 m), and a displacement of 325 long tons (330 t; 364 short tons). Kathleen Moore's draft is 9 feet 6 inches (2.90 m) and the ship has a maximum speed of over 28 knots (52 km/h; 32 mph). The Sentinel-class cutters have an endurance of five days and a range of 2,950 nautical miles (3,390 mi; 5,460 km).

== Operational history ==
In November 2015 Kathleen Moore participated in the interception and repatriation of 85 individuals who tried to flee Cuba, by sea.

In February, June and July 2016, Kathleen Moore repatriated 10, 83 and 50 Cuban refugees.

== Namesake ==
Moore started working for the U.S. Lighthouse Service when she was 12 years old, and was credited with saving at least 21 lives over the course of her career.

In 2010, Master Chief Petty Officer of the Coast Guard Charles "Skip" W. Bowen, the U.S. Coast Guard's senior enlisted person at the time, lobbied for the new Sentinel-class cutters to be named after enlisted Coast Guardsmen, or personnel from its precursor services, who had distinguished themselves by their heroism.
