= 71st Pennsylvania Infantry Regiment =

Union Army infantry regiment

71st Regiment, Pennsylvania Volunteer Infantry
- Pennsylvania flag
- Active: August 1861 to July 2, 1864
- Country: United States
- Allegiance: Union
- Branch: Infantry
- Engagements: Siege of Yorktown; Battle of Seven Pines; Battle of Savage's Station; Battle of Ball's Bluff; Seven Days Battles; Battle of Glendale; Battle of Malvern Hill; Battle of Second Bull Run; Battle of Chantilly; Battle of Antietam; Battle of Fredericksburg; Battle of Gettysburg; Overland Campaign; Battle of Banks' Ford; Battle of the Wilderness; Battle of Spotsylvania Court House; Battle of Cold Harbor

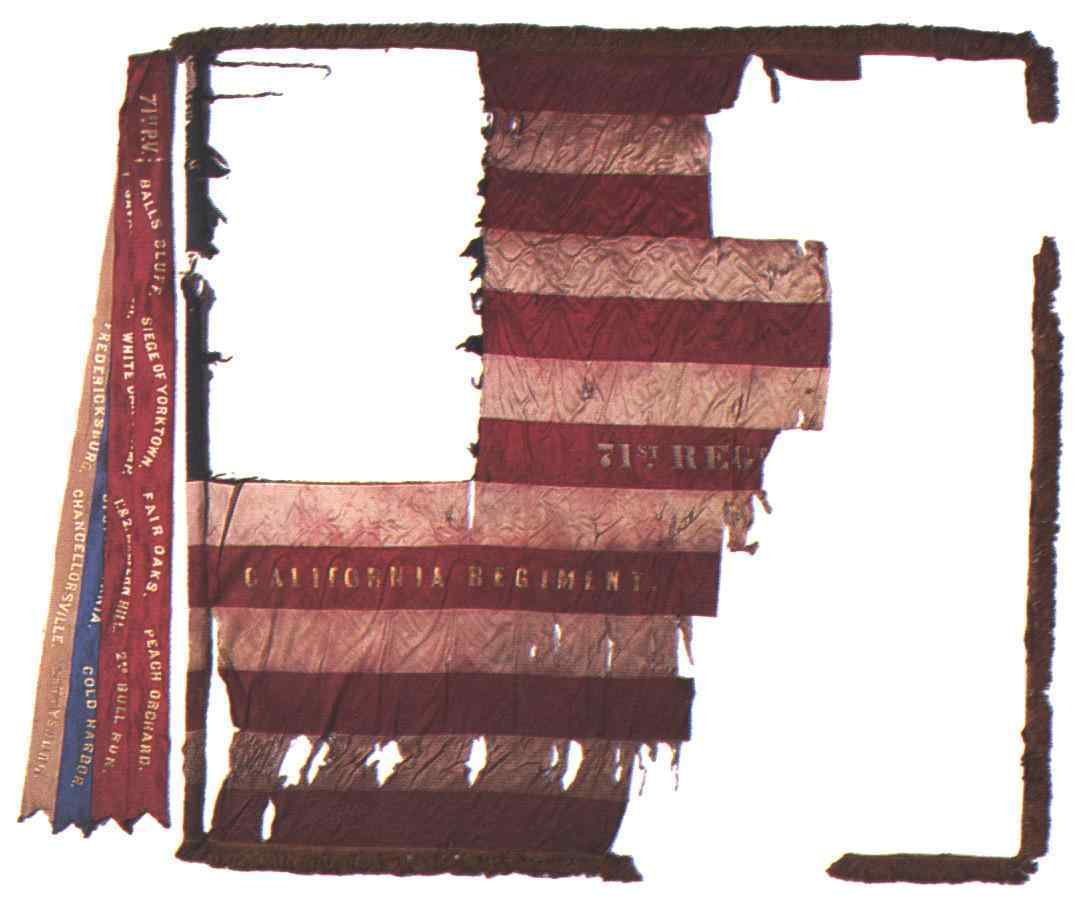
Regimental flag of the 71st Pennsylvania Volunteer Infantry

The 71st Regiment, Pennsylvania Volunteer Infantry (originally raised as the 1st California) was an infantry regiment of the Union Army that participated in the American Civil War.

== History ==
The 71st Pennsylvania was organized in August 1861 by Oregon Senator Edward D. Baker, composed of 15 companies instead of the standard 10. Although raised from residents of Philadelphia, it was initially designated the 1st Regiment, California Volunteer Infantry in deference to Baker's wishes. After his death at the Battle of Ball's Bluff in October 1861, it was renamed the 71st Regiment, Pennsylvania Volunteer Infantry. It was grouped with the 69th, 72nd, and 106th Pennsylvania regiments to form the famous Philadelphia Brigade.

The 71st was assigned to the II Corps in time to participate in the 1862 Peninsula Campaign. During the Seven Days Battles, it made several charges, losing many officers and men. After reaching Harrison's Landing, companies L, M, N, P, and R were merged into the first ten companies. The regiment, along with rest of the Army of the Potomac, was transferred to northern Virginia. Here the 71st fought at the battles of Second Bull Run and Chantilly. It helped cover Pope's retreat. At the Battle of Antietam that September, the regiment lost one third of its strength. It again suffered heavy losses at the Battle of Fredericksburg in December.

At the Battle of Gettysburg the 71st helped defeat the attack by Brig. Gen. Ambrose Wright's brigade on July 2. That evening, it was briefly sent to Culp's Hill but was quickly ordered to retreat from the line by its Colonel, Richard P. Smith, who remarked that "he would not have his men murdered". The next day, the 71st was positioned at the famous Angle on Cemetery Ridge. Eight companies of the regiment was placed along the advanced wall with the 69th Pennsylvania to its left, while the other two companies were 50 yards to its right-rear. Col. Smith put Lt. Col. Charles Kochersperger in charge of the companies squeezed into the line and, before he moved himself to the rear, ordered Kochersperger to withdraw the men if the enemy came too close. During Pickett's Charge, the enemy did indeed come "too close", and Kochersperger withdrew the 71st from the line after a few volleys. Brig. Gen. Alexander S. Webb managed to rally the regiment near the 72nd and 106th Pennsylvania, but was unable to convince any of the three units to counterattack at first. Finally after several minutes, they helped to push the Confederates out of the Angle. The 71st lost 98 officers and men during the attack, including nine out of fifteen officers.

The 71st served through the Overland Campaign, losing heavily in both men and officers. At the Battle of the Wilderness, Lt. Col. Charles Kochersperger was wounded and five colorbearers were shot down, and at the Battle of Spotsylvania Court House, Capt. Mitchell Smith was killed. The regiment's last battle as a unit was at Cold Harbor.

Afterwards, those entitled to discharge (a total of 53) were mustered out in Philadelphia on July 2, 1864. The remainder of the regiment was merged into the 69th Pennsylvania. Out of a total of 1,665 men who served in the regiment during the war, only 153 returned uninjured.

== Casualties ==
- Killed and mortally wounded: 14 officers, 147 enlisted men
- Wounded: 24 officers, 372 enlisted men
- Died of disease: 1 officer, 98 enlisted men
- Captured or missing: 10 officers, 320 men
- Total casualties: 49 officers, 1,211 enlisted men

== Commanders ==
- Col. Edward Baker, to October 21, 1861
- Col. Isaac J. Wistar, from October 21, 1861, to November 29, 1862
- Lt. Col. John Markoe
- Col. Richard Penn Smith, to July 2, 1864
- Lt. Col. Charles Kochersperger
- Capt. Mitchell Smith

== Major battles and campaigns ==
- Siege of Yorktown
- Battle of Seven Pines
- Battle of Savage's Station
- Battle of Ball's Bluff
- Battle of Antietam
- Battle of Gettysburg
- Battle of Cold Harbor

== See also ==
- List of Pennsylvania Civil War Units
