= Mary Roman =

American athlete (1935–2020)

Mary Barboza Roman (September 9, 1935 – March 23, 2020) was an American senior Olympics athlete and community leader.

== Early life ==
Born Mary Barboza in Pittsfield, Massachusetts, she was the daughter of a nurse and a railroad construction worker. She was the eldest of three children. The family lived in the Berkshires, where some of their cousins, including Lynda Jean Gunn, occasionally modeled for illustrations by Norman Rockwell. Mary graduated from Williams High School and Springfield College.

== Athletic achievements ==
After contracting polio as a child, Roman was advised to do English-style horseback riding as it would strengthen her legs. "I guess it worked," she later said.

Beginning in 1989, encouraged by her husband's competitive swimming athleticism, Roman competed in senior track and field events. She competed in sprints and jumps, but excelled in throwing events such as javelin and shot put. A heart attack in 2003 did not stop her from continuing her athletic pursuits.

In 2009, she competed in the New England Regional Outdoor Track and Field Championships, winning four gold medals in the women's age 70-74 category; the Masters Outdoor Championships, where she won three gold medals, a silver and a bronze; and the Senior Olympics (Senior Games), where she won a silver. The Fairfield County Sports Commission named her Norwalk's Sports Person of the Year for 2009. In 2017 she received a donation from the Fairfield County Sports Commission to support her participation in the World Masters Games in Australia.

By 2014 Mary Roman had won more than 250 medals and was ranked first in the United States in the women's age 75-79 ultra-weight throw, super-weight throw, and weight throw; and eighth in the world in the latter. She also held the U.S. record in the shot put in the women's 65–69, 70–74, and 75-79 age groups.

== Community and family ==
Roman identified as African American, although her mother was Native American and her father was of Portuguese descent. She married Granville Roman in 1953 and moved to Stamford, Connecticut. They soon bought a house in Norwalk, where they raised five sons. Granville died in 1999.

Roman worked in banking, advancing from teller to an executive position before going to work for the City of Norwalk. There she served as Assistant City Clerk and City Clerk under three different mayors. She ran unsuccessfully for Town Clerk in 2009.

Her community volunteer activities included serving on many boards and commissions, including the Norwalk Senior Center, STAR, Rotary Club, and the city's Charter Revision Commission.

In recognition of her community service and athletic achievements, in November 2024, Norwalk renamed the track around Malmquist Field, located on the city hall campus, for Roman.

== Death ==
Roman died from complications of COVID-19 in Norwalk, Connecticut, on March 23, 2020, at age 84. After her death, Roman was featured in a COVID-19 memorial segment on PBS television.
