= 10-pounder Parrott rifle =

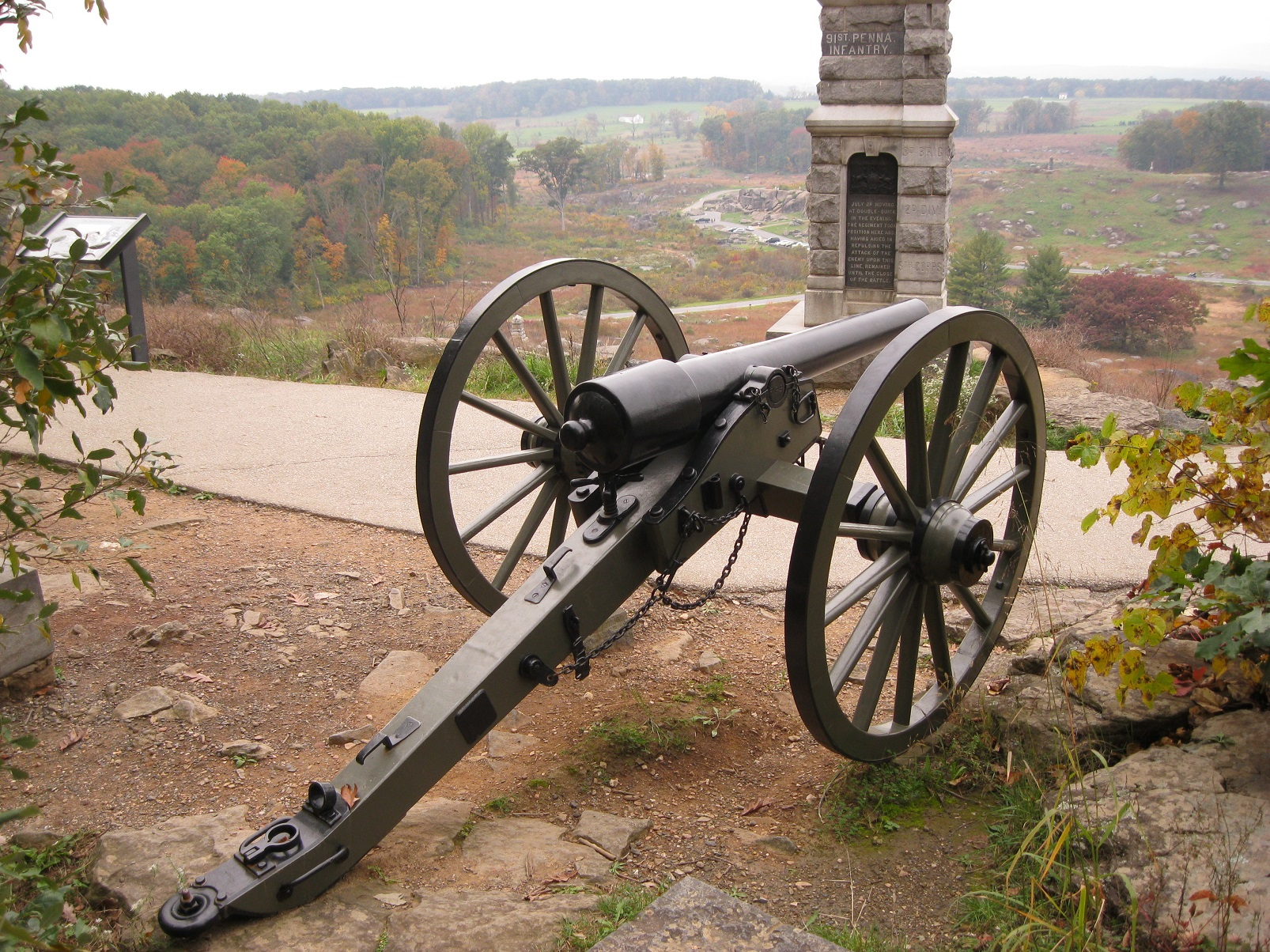
- 10-pounder Parrott rifle representing 1st Lt. Charles E. Hazlett's 5th U.S. Artillery, Battery D on Little Round Top.
- Type: Rifled cannon
- Place of origin: United States

Service history
- In service: 1861–1865
- Used by: United States; Confederate States
- Wars: American Civil War

Production history
- Designer: Robert Parker Parrott
- Designed: 1859–1860
- Manufacturer: West Point Foundry
- Unit cost: $180
- Produced: 1861–1865
- No. built: United States: 2.9-inch: 228–255; United States: 3.0-inch: 279; Confederate States: 80+
- Variants: United States: 2.9-inch (1861–1862); United States: 3.0-inch (1864–1865)

Specifications
- Mass: 890 lb (403.7 kg)
- Length: 74 in (1.88 m)
- Crew: 9
- Shell weight: 9.5 lb (4.3 kg) shell 1.0 lb (0.5 kg) charge
- Caliber: 2.9 in (74 mm); 3.0 in (76 mm)
- Barrels: 1
- Action: Muzzle loading
- Carriage: 900 lb (408 kg)
- Muzzle velocity: 1,230 ft/s (375 m/s)
- Effective firing range: 1,850 yd (1,690 m) at 5°

The 10-pounder Parrott rifle, Model 1861 was a muzzle-loading rifled cannon made of wrought iron-reinforced cast iron. One of a line of Parrott rifles, the 10-pounder was capable of firing shell, shrapnel shell (case shot), canister shot, or solid shot. It was adopted by the United States Army in 1861 and often used in field artillery units during the American Civil War. Midway through the war, the Federal government discontinued the nominally 10 lb (4.5 kg), 2.9 in (74 mm) projectile version in favor of a 3.0 in (76 mm) version. Despite the reinforcing band, the guns occasionally burst without warning, which endangered the gun crews. The Confederate States of America manufactured a number of successful copies of the gun.

== Background ==
All cannons need to be strong enough to withstand the explosion which reduces their gunpowder charge to propellant gas. Bronze smoothbore cannons were in need of a larger powder charge because there was windage – or space – between the shot and the barrel. Windage caused the propellant gases from the explosion to leak out, but it also reduced the stress on the gun barrel. With rifled cannon, the ammunition was designed to expand the shell so that there was no windage between the projectile and the gun barrel. This meant that a smaller gunpowder charge could hurl a rifled projectile farther, but it also meant that the gun barrel was subjected to greater stress. Bronze cannons rarely burst because the metal was more ductile. Cast iron was stronger than bronze, but it was also more brittle. This made cast-iron guns more prone to burst at the breech or muzzle.

In 1836, when Robert Parker Parrott was an ordnance officer in the U.S. Army, he resigned to take a job with the West Point Foundry in Cold Spring, New York. A few years before the American Civil War, gun manufacturers wrestled with problem of rifling cannons. Bronze was too soft of a metal for rifling, while cast iron was hard enough but too brittle. Parrott attempted to solve this dilemma by inventing a cast-iron rifled cannon that had a wrought-iron reinforcing band wrapped around the firing chamber end of the gun. Initial banded guns were not rotated when manufactured, so gravity acted on the bands as they cooled, making an uneven fit. Parrott solved the problem by rotating the gun during the cooling process while cold water was poured down the barrel, heat-shrinking the reinforcement band in place. The gun was first developed in 1860. Parrott later remarked, "I do not profess to think that they are the best gun in the world, but I think they were the best practical thing that could be got at the time".

In addition to reinforcing band failure, the gun would also burst unpredictably at the muzzle, or near the trunnions. The Parrott field guns were simple for the gun crews to operate and the guns were usable even if part of the muzzle was blown off. Another great advantage of the 10-pounder Parrott was its low average cost of $180 per gun barrel. Compared to this, the bronze 12-pounder Napoleon cost $550 and the 3-inch Ordnance rifle cost $350 per gun. On 23 May 1861, the US government accepted the first ten 10-pounder Parrott rifles. The West Point Foundry helped the Federal war effort to such a degree that a joke made the rounds that the U.S. national emblem should be changed from an eagle to a parrot. The 20-pounder Parrott rifle (with banded breech) was also employed in field artillery units, but the 10-pounder Parrott was far more commonly used.

== Manufacture ==
The West Point Foundry manufactured between 228 and 255 2.9-inch 10-pounder Parrott rifles, Model 1861 through the end of 1862. Because the Ordnance Department thoroughly trusted Robert Parrott, he acted as both gun manufacturer and the inspecting ordnance officer, a unique arrangement. The gun barrels weighed between 884 lb (401 kg) and 917 lb (416 kg). The rifling consisted of three equally-wide lands and grooves. At first the guns were equipped with a tall, thin front sight at the muzzle and a pendulum hausse rear sight on the breech. The front sight was easily damaged, so this arrangement was soon replaced by a front sight on top of the right rimbase (adjacent to the trunnion) and a brass Parrott tangent sight mounted on the right side of the wrought iron band at a two o'clock orientation. On 24 September 1863, the Ordnance Board recommended that production of the 2.9-inch Parrott be halted and that existing guns be re-bored to 3-inch caliber. This decision may have been influenced by gun jams caused by accidentally loading the 2.9-inch Parrott with 3-inch ammunition. Between November 1864 and June 1865, 119 2.9-inch Parrott rifles were converted to 3-inch caliber, though none have survived. The West Point Foundry halted production of 2.9-inch Parrott rifles on 13 April 1863 and the 3-inch versions did not appear until 12 February 1864. Altogether, 279 of the new 3-inch Parrott rifles, Model 1863 were manufactured until 4 September 1865.

In 1860, the West Point Foundry sold a Parrott rifle to the state of Virginia. The artillery piece was put through trials by Thomas J. Jackson, a little-known Virginia Military Institute professor who later became famous as a Confederate general known as "Stonewall Jackson". Impressed by its range and accuracy, Jackson gave it a glowing report, leading Virginia to order 12 more. These guns were probably of 2.9-inch caliber, but this is not certain. In any case, one of these Parrott rifles performed admirably at the Battle of Big Bethel on 10 June 1861. With the outbreak of war, the Tredegar Iron Works began manufacturing a copy of the 2.9-inch Parrott rifle for the Confederacy. Tredegar produced 80 2.9-inch Parrott rifles from 18 November 1861 to 20 February 1865. Other Confederate gun founders manufactured the Parrott rifles including A. B. Reading & Brother of Vicksburg, Mississippi, Street, Hungerford & Jackson of Memphis, Tennessee, and Bujac and Bennett of New Orleans. Five guns survived, but no manufacturer can be positively identified from their markings.

== Specifications ==
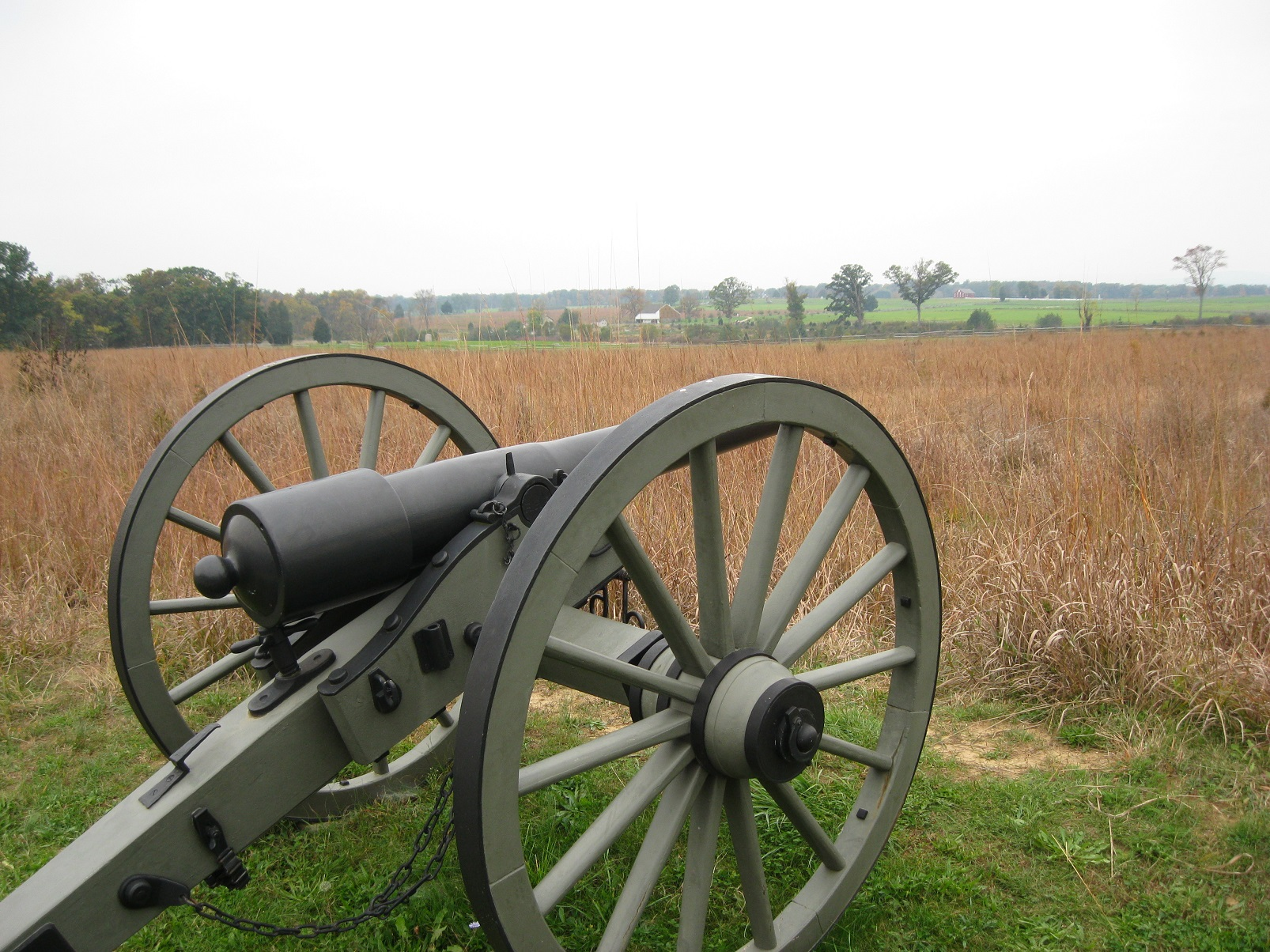
The reinforcing band was heat-shrunk onto the gun

The 10-pounder Parrott rifle was a muzzle-loader. It had a bore (caliber) with a diameter of 2.9 in (74 mm) and fired a projectile weighing 9.5 lb (4.3 kg). Its gun barrel was 74 in (188 cm) long and weighed about 890 lb (403.7 kg). The gunpowder charge weighed 1.0 lb (0.5 kg) and fired the projectile with a muzzle velocity of 1,230 ft/s (375 m/s) to a distance of between 1,850 yd (1,692 m) and 1,900 yd (1,737 m) The 10-pounder Parrott was manufactured with a right-hand gaining twist (increasing toward the muzzle). The twist rate was one turn in 16 ft (4.9 m). A smoothbore cannon's projectile typically retained only one-third of its muzzle velocity at 1,500 yd (1,372 m) and its round shot could be seen in the air. Meanwhile, a rifled projectile generally retained two-thirds of its initial velocity at 1,500 yds. and remained invisible in flight. However, a rifled projectile could become visible if the shell began to tumble out of control. Tumbling occurred when the shell failed to take the grooves inside the gun barrel or when the spin wore off in flight. The unusual 2.9-inch caliber was the same as that of a smoothbore 3-pounder gun, which fired a round shot with a diameter of 2.9 inches. Rifled projectiles were heavier than smoothbore shot because they were elongated on both ends, tapered for aerodynamics on one end and shaped like a shell on the other to maximize the projectile's exposure to the grooves.

The 10-pounder Parrott rifle was mounted on the standard gun carriage for the M1841 6-pounder field gun. Because its projectile weighed more than a 6-pound round shot, the rifle's greater recoil could damage the gun carriage. The 6-pounder carriage weighed 900 lb (408 kg). The 10-pounder Parrott rifle fired case shot (shrapnel), common shell, and canister shot. The use of bolts (solid shot) was rare and it was generally not provided in the ammunition chests. Firing shell without the fuse would accomplish the same result as firing a solid shot from a rifled gun. Parrott ammunition was designed to be used. In an emergency, 3-inch Parrott rifles could also fire Hotchkiss and Schenkl ammunition. However, experience showed that Parrott projectiles worked best in Parrott rifles while Hotchkiss and Schenkl projectiles were most effective when fired from the 3-inch Ordnance rifle. That was because the 10-pounder Parrott rifling had 3 grooves while the 3-inch Ordnance rifling had 7 grooves. In particular, the Parrott rifle's gaining twist caused the Hotchkiss projectile's soft sabot to be torn off. One weakness of Parrott ammunition was the sabot's position at the projectile's base. This meant that the final impulse on the shell as it left the gun was on its base, potentially causing the shell to wobble.

For two reasons, canister shot fired from rifled guns was less effective than canister fired from a 12-pounder Napoleon or a M1841 12-pounder howitzer. First, the rifled gun's 2.9-inch or 3-inch bore was narrower than the 12-pounder's 4.62 in (117 mm) bore and could hurl fewer canister balls. Second, the barrel's rifling caused the canister to be blasted in an irregular pattern. Union General Henry Jackson Hunt believed that the range of canister fired from rifled guns was only half the 400 yd (366 m) effective range of canister fired from the 12-pounder Napoleon.

Federal batteries were organized with six guns of identical type early in the conflict. Each 6-gun battery required fourteen 6-horse teams and seven spare horses. The teams towed the six artillery pieces and limbers, six caissons, one battery wagon, and one traveling forge. Each caisson carried two ammunition chests and the limber carried one additional ammunition chest. The 10-pounder Parrott rifle carried 50 rounds in each ammunition chest. A memo from November 1863 specified that rifled guns should have 25 shells, 20 shrapnel (case shot), and 5 canister rounds in each ammunition chest. In March 1865, a memo recommended that each chest carry 30 shells, 15 shrapnel, and 5 canister rounds for rifled guns of the horse artillery. The gun required a crew consisting of 1 sergeant, 2 corporals, and 6 gunners, while 6 drivers managed the horses.

Confederate 2.9-inch Parrott Rifle Specifications (probably copied from Federal)
Description	Dimension
Diameter of the bore (caliber)	2.91 in (74 mm)
Length of the bore	69.875 in (177.5 cm)
Length from the rear of the knob to the muzzle	78.375 in (199.1 cm)
Length from the end of the breech to the muzzle	72.875 in (185.1 cm)
Length from the rear of the knob to the center of the trunnions	31.5 in (80.0 cm)
Length of the wrought iron band	13.0 in (33.0 cm)
Diameter of the trunnions	3.69 in (94 mm)
Thickness of metal at the wrought iron band	8.47 in (215 mm)
Thickness of metal forward of the wrought iron band	6.09 in (155 mm)
Thickness of metal at the muzzle	3.34 in (85 mm)

== History ==
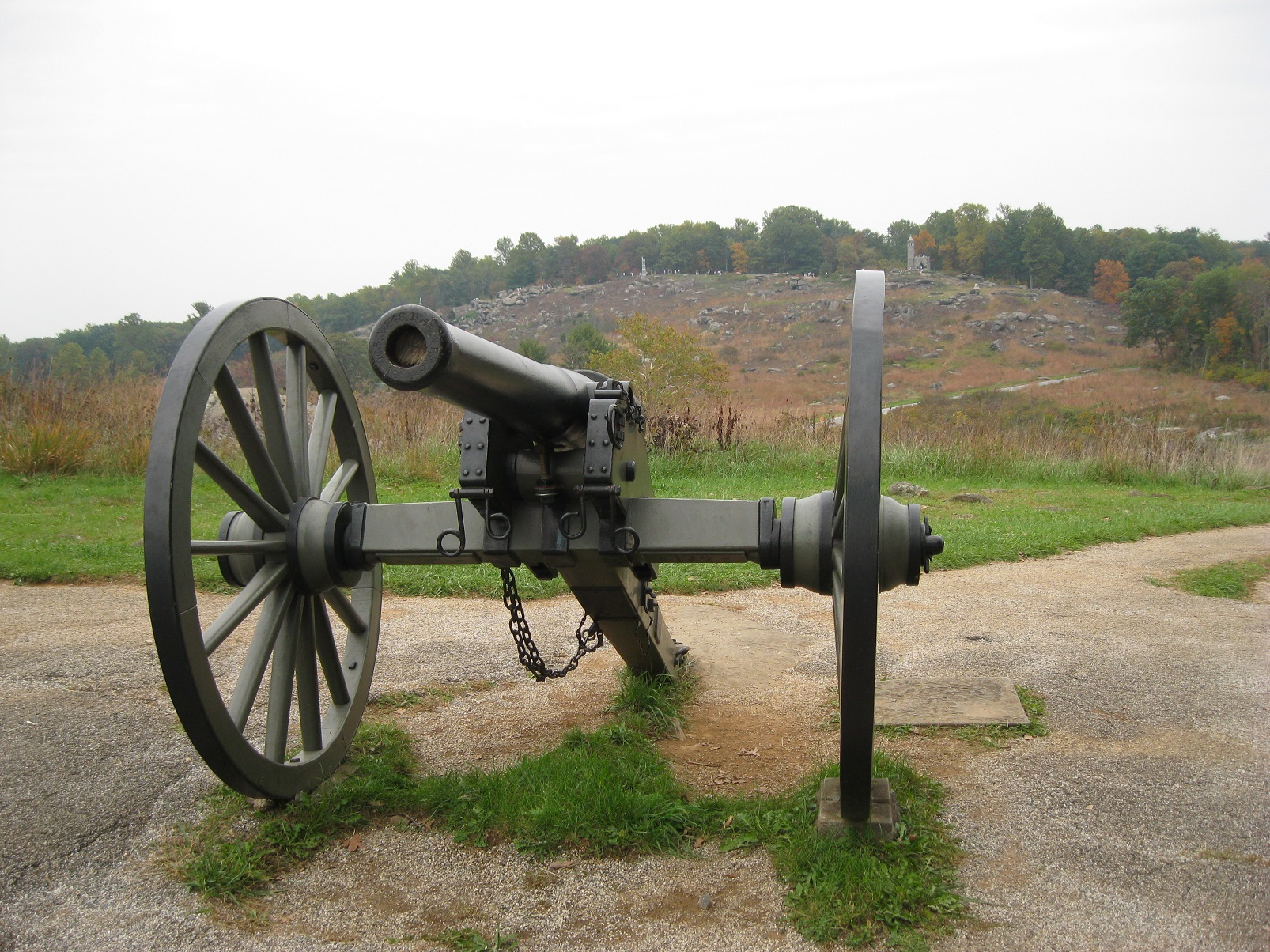
10-pounder Parrott rifle with Little Round Top in the background at Gettysburg National Military Park

Captain Richard Waterman of Battery C, 1st Rhode Island Light Artillery, believed that the 10-pounder Parrott rifle was more accurate than the 3-inch Ordnance rifle at 900–1,500 yd (823–1,372 m) range. Union General Quincy Adams Gillmore liked the Parrott rifles, noting that untrained artillery crews could easily learn how to operate them. Confederate officer Edward Porter Alexander wanted to get rid of his 10-pounder Parrott rifles and replace them with M1841 24-pounder howitzers. One artillery officer reported that the Parrott percussion shells performed very well with only two shells failing to explode out of about 30.

In the First Battle of Kernstown on 23 March 1862, the Union troops temporarily under the command of Nathan Kimball included 4th U.S. Artillery, Battery E (Clark's) armed with six 10-pounder Parrott rifles. At the Battle of Antietam on 17 September 1862, the number of 10-pounder Parrott rifles was 57 for the Union Army of the Potomac and at least 43 for the Confederate Army of Northern Virginia. Union 10-pounder Parrott rifles were almost all massed in four or six gun batteries. Meanwhile, the Confederates distributed theirs by ones, twos, or threes in mixed batteries. The six-gun Union batteries included Battery B, 1st New York Light Artillery (Pettit's), Battery A, 1st Rhode Island Light Artillery (Tompkins's), Battery A, 1st New Jersey Light Artillery (Hexamer's), and Battery D, 1st Pennsylvania Light Artillery (Durell's). McCarthy's Richmond Virginia battery consisted of two 10-pounder Parrott rifles and two 6-pounder field guns.

At the Second Battle of Corinth on 3–4 October 1862, Battery H, 1st Missouri Light Artillery was armed with a mix of 10-pounder Parrott rifles and 24-pounder howitzers. In 1862 alone, the US government ordered 270,699 Parrott projectiles. This included ammunition for Parrott rifles other than the 10-pounder. On 2 July 1863 during the Battle of Gettysburg, the six 10-pounder Parrott rifles of the 5th U.S. Artillery, Battery D commanded by Captain Charles E. Hazlett took position on Little Round Top. When General Gouverneur K. Warren pointed out that the guns would not be able to fire on their attackers, Hazlett replied, "The sound of my guns will be encouraging to our troops." The Parrott rifles were not used again after the end of the war. In October 1865, the Chief of Ordnance stated that the frequent bursting of Parrott rifles lowered confidence in the weapon and that the Ordnance department would look for a more reliable weapon.

== Civil War artillery ==
Characteristics of American Civil War artillery pieces
Description	Caliber	Tube length	Tube weight	Carriage weight	Shot weight	Charge weight	Range 5° elev.
M1841 6-pounder cannon	3.67 in (9.3 cm)	60 in (152 cm)	884 lb (401 kg)	900 lb (408 kg)	6.1 lb (2.8 kg)	1.25 lb (0.6 kg)	1,523 yd (1,393 m)
M1841 12-pounder cannon	4.62 in (11.7 cm)	78 in (198 cm)	1,757 lb (797 kg)	1,175 lb (533 kg)	12.3 lb (5.6 kg)	2.5 lb (1.1 kg)	1,663 yd (1,521 m)
M1841 12-pounder howitzer	4.62 in (11.7 cm)	53 in (135 cm)	788 lb (357 kg)	900 lb (408 kg)	8.9 lb (4.0 kg)	1.0 lb (0.5 kg)	1,072 yd (980 m)
M1841 24-pounder howitzer	5.82 in (14.8 cm)	65 in (165 cm)	1,318 lb (598 kg)	1,128 lb (512 kg)	18.4 lb (8.3 kg)	2.0 lb (0.9 kg)	1,322 yd (1,209 m)
M1857 12-pounder Napoleon	4.62 in (11.7 cm)	66 in (168 cm)	1,227 lb (557 kg)	1,128 lb (512 kg)	12.3 lb (5.6 kg)	2.5 lb (1.1 kg)	1,619 yd (1,480 m)
12-pounder James rifle	3.67 in (9.3 cm)	60 in (152 cm)	875 lb (397 kg)	900 lb (408 kg)	12 lb (5.4 kg)	0.75 lb (0.3 kg)	1,700 yd (1,554 m)
3-inch Ordnance rifle	3.0 in (7.6 cm)	69 in (175 cm)	820 lb (372 kg)	900 lb (408 kg)	9.5 lb (4.3 kg)	1.0 lb (0.5 kg)	1,830 yd (1,673 m)
10-pounder Parrott rifle	3.0 in (7.6 cm)	74 in (188 cm)	899 lb (408 kg)	900 lb (408 kg)	9.5 lb (4.3 kg)	1.0 lb (0.5 kg)	1,900 yd (1,737 m)
20-pounder Parrott rifle	3.67 in (9.3 cm)	84 in (213 cm)	1,750 lb (794 kg)	1,175 lb (533 kg)	20 lb (9.1 kg)	2.0 lb (0.9 kg)	1,900 yd (1,737 m)

Citations
