= Little Round Top =

Hill fought over during the Battle of Gettysburg

Coordinates: 39.7920°N 77.2363°W

Battle of Little Round Top
- Part of the Gettysburg campaign
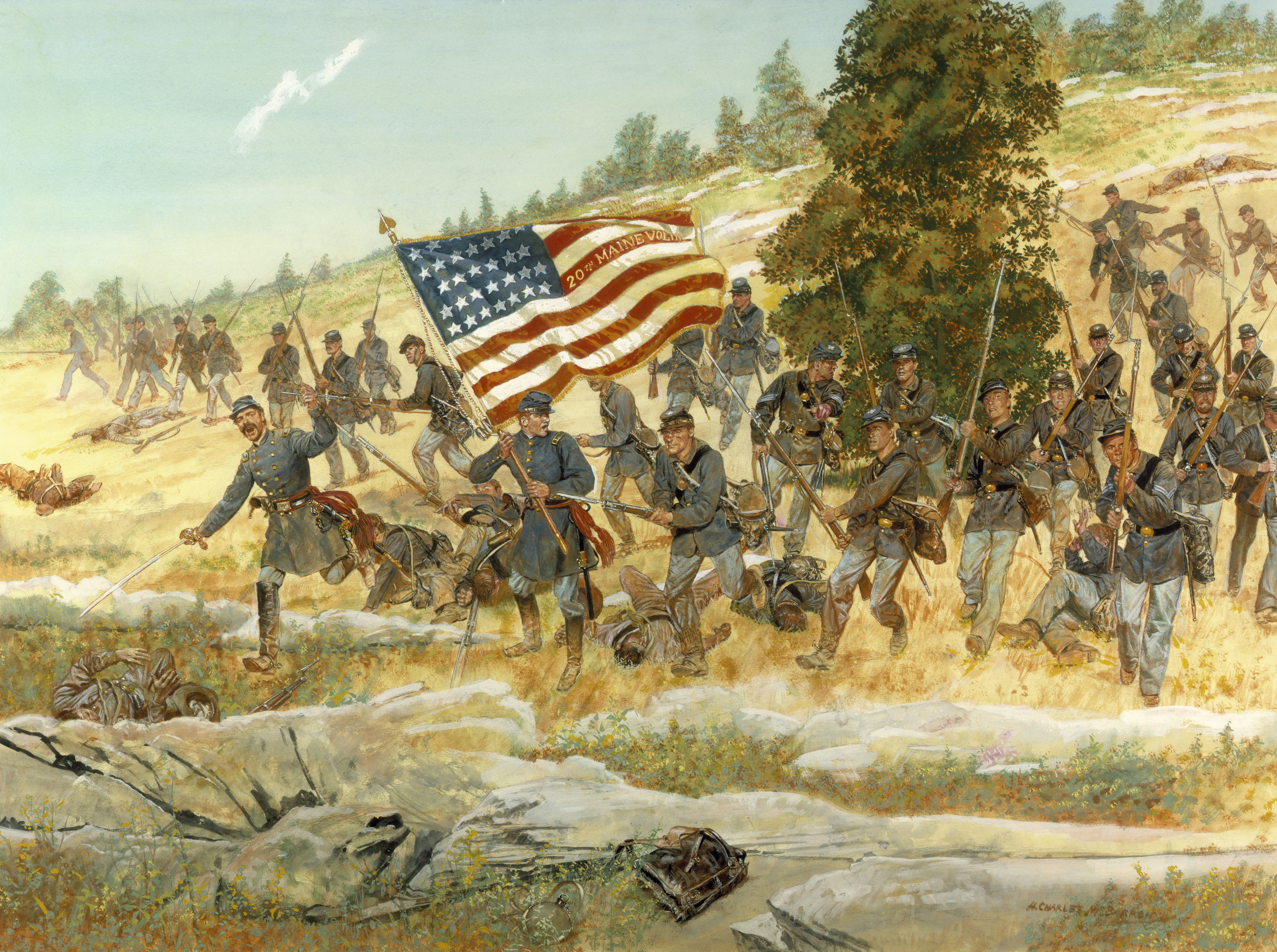
- "The Famous Charge of the Twentieth Maine on 2 July 1863" by H. Charles McBarron
Date	July 2, 1863
Location	Gettysburg, Pennsylvania
Result	Union victory

Belligerents
United States of America	Confederate States of America

Commanders and leaders
Joshua Chamberlain: G. K. Warren; Strong Vincent †	John Bell Hood: Evander M. Law; James L. Sheffield

Strength
2,996 troops	4,864 troops

Casualties and losses
565: 134 killed; 402 wounded; 29 missing	1.366: 279 killed; 868 wounded; 219 missing

Little Round Top is the smaller of two rocky hills south of Gettysburg, Pennsylvania—the companion to the adjacent, taller hill named Big Round Top. It was the site of an unsuccessful assault by Confederate troops against the Union left flank on July 2, 1863, the second day of the Battle of Gettysburg, during the American Civil War.

Little Round Top was successfully defended by a brigade under Colonel Strong Vincent, who was mortally wounded during the fighting and died five days later. The 20th Maine Volunteer Infantry Regiment, commanded by Colonel Joshua Chamberlain, fought its most famous engagement there, culminating in a dramatic downhill bayonet charge. The battle at Little Round Top subsequently became one of the most well-known actions at Gettysburg, and of the entire war.

== Geography ==
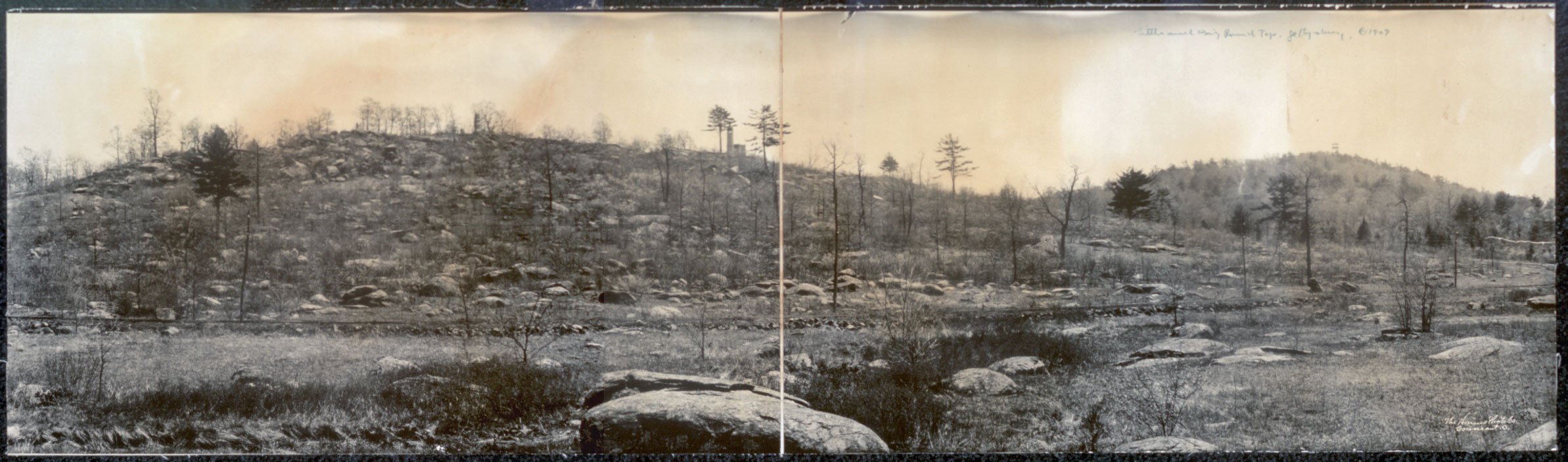
Little Round Top (left) and [Big] Round Top, photographed from Plum Run Valley in 1909

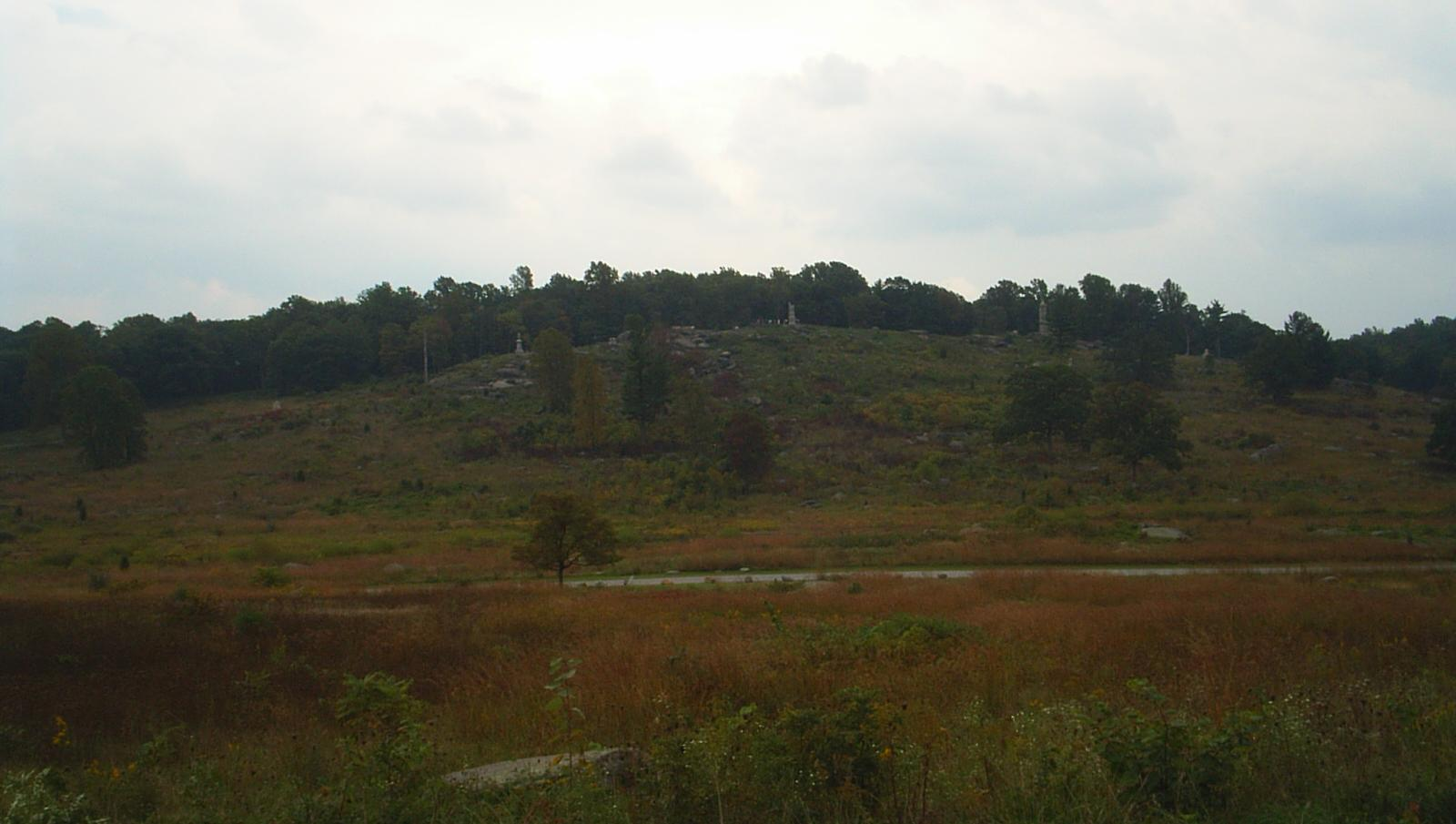
Little Round Top photographed in 2006

Little Round Top is a large diabase spur of Big Round Top with an oval crest that forms a short ridgeline with a summit of 63 ft (19 m) prominence above the saddle point to Big Round Top to the south. It is located in Cumberland Township, approximately two miles (3 km) south of Gettysburg, with a rugged, steep slope rising 150 feet (46 m) above nearby Plum Run to the west and strewn with large boulders. The summit is a total of 650 feet (200 m) above sea level. Historically, the western slope was generally free of vegetation, while the summit and eastern and southern slopes were lightly wooded. Directly to the south is Big Round Top, 130 feet (40 m) higher and densely wooded.

The igneous landform was created 200 million years ago when the "outcrop of the Gettysburg sill" intruded through the Triassic "Gettysburg plain". Subsequent periglacial frost wedging during the Pleistocene formed the hill's extensive boulders.

There is no evidence that the name "Little Round Top" was used by soldiers or civilians during the battle, although Col. Franklin A. Haskell, writing to his brother on July 16, 1863, calls it so. (Note: See, e.g., paragraph beginning, “Without a topological map,” about 15% into his letter, first reprinted in “A History of the Class of 1854 in Dartmouth College” (Boston: Alfred Mudge & Son, 1898).) Although the larger hill was known before the battle as Round Top, Round Top Mountain, and sometimes Round Hill, accounts written in 1863 referred to the smaller hill with a variety of names: Rock Hill, High Knob, Sugar Loaf Hill, Broad Top Summit, and granite spur of Round Top. Historian John B. Bachelder, who had an enormous influence on the preservation of the Gettysburg battlefield, personally favored the name "Weed's Hill", in honor of Brigadier General Stephen H. Weed, who was mortally wounded on Little Round Top. Bachelder abandoned that name by 1873. One of the first public uses of "Little Round Top" was by Edward Everett in his oration at the dedication of the Soldiers' National Cemetery on November 19, 1863.

== Battle of Gettysburg ==
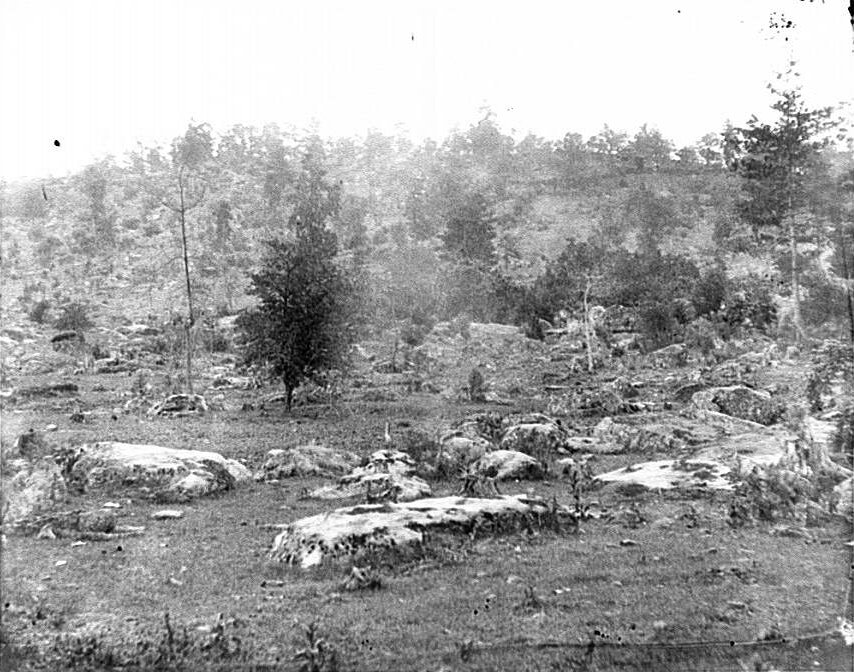
Little Round Top, western slope, photographed by Timothy H. O'Sullivan, 1863

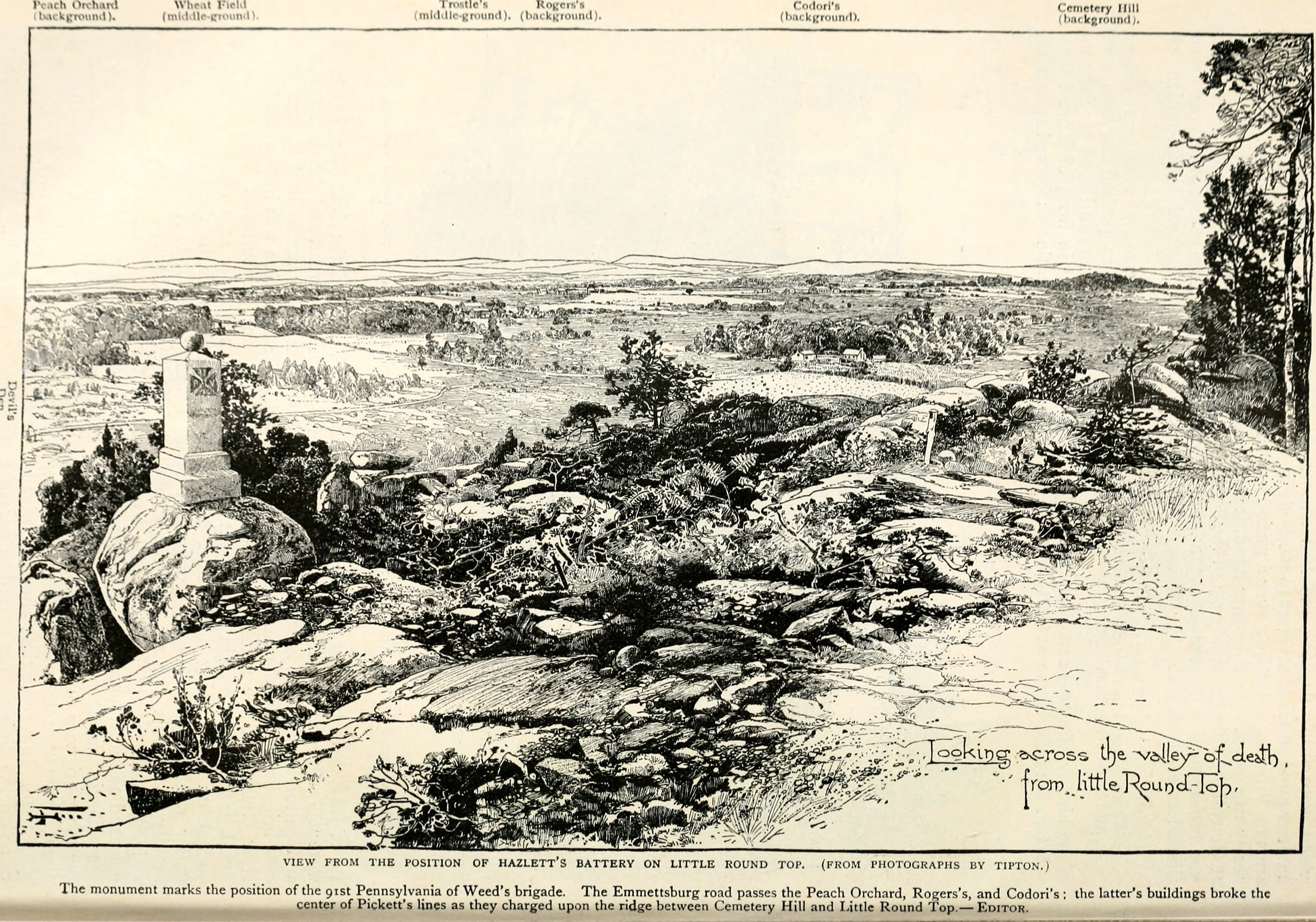
Looking from the position of Hazlett's Battery on Little Round Top toward the Valley of Death

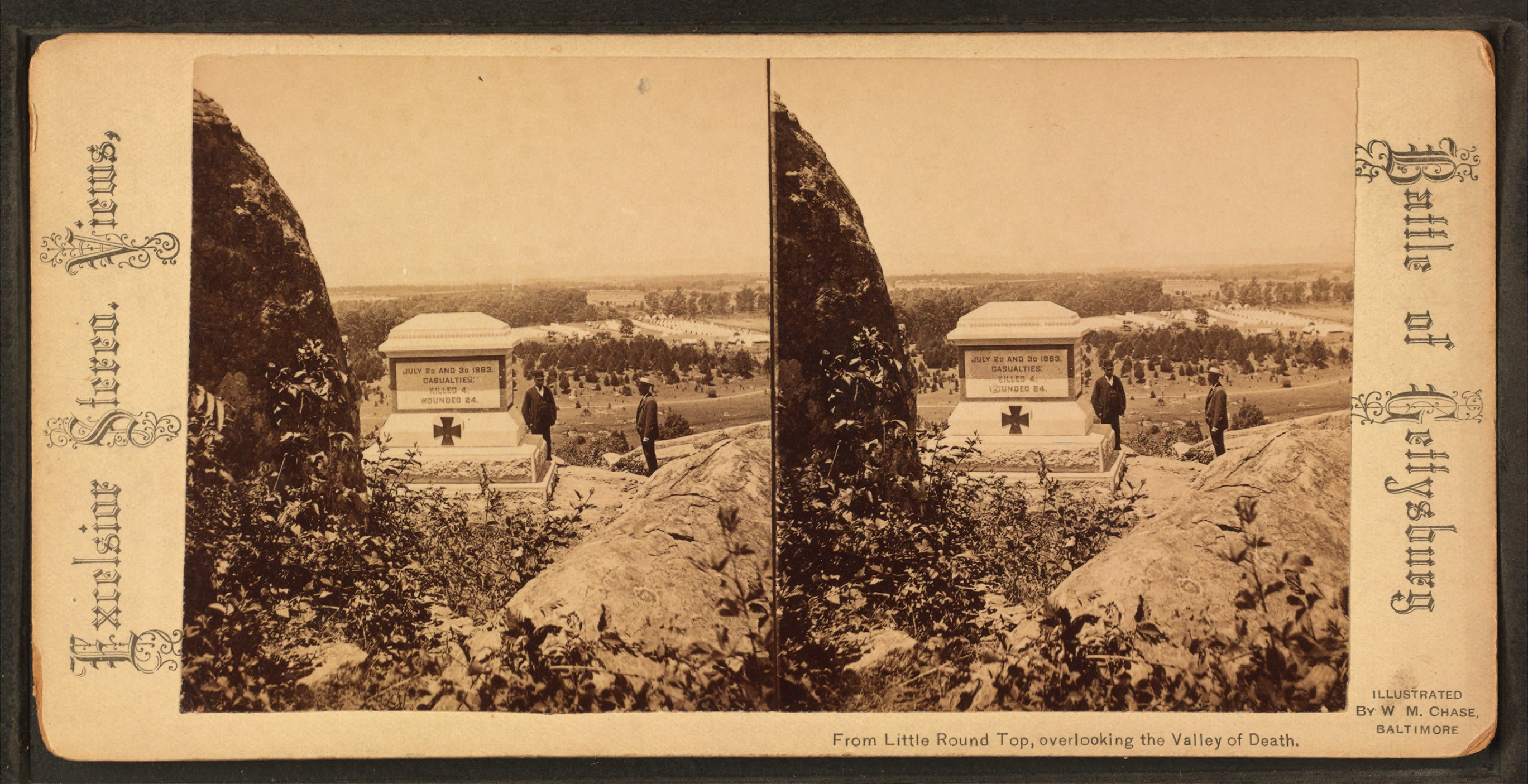
Looking from Little Round Top toward the Valley of Death (Devil's Den would be located in the left background)

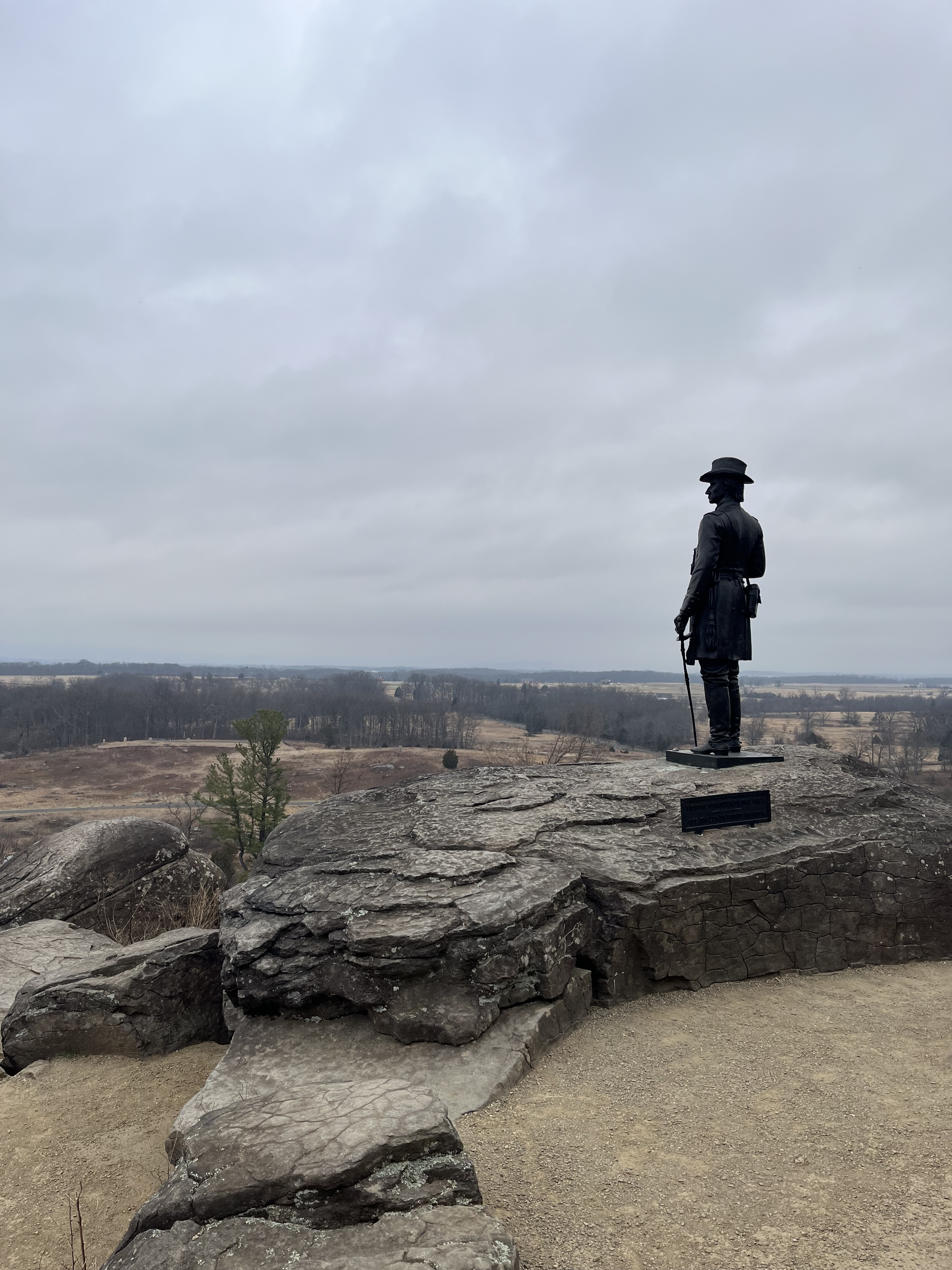
Monument of General Warren overlooking the battlefield from Little Round Top

On the second day of the Battle of Gettysburg, July 2, 1863, at about 4 PM, Confederate Lt. Gen. James Longstreet's First Corps began an attack ordered by General Robert E. Lee that was intended to drive northeast up the Emmitsburg Road in the direction of Cemetery Hill, rolling up the Union left flank. Maj. Gen. John Bell Hood's division was assigned to attack up the eastern side of the road, Maj. Gen. Lafayette McLaws's division the western side. Hood's division stepped off first, but instead of guiding on the road, elements began to swing directly to the east in the direction of the Round Tops. Instead of driving the entire division up the spine of Houck's Ridge (the boulder-strewn area known to the soldiers as the Devil's Den), parts of Hood's division detoured over Round Top and approached the southern slope of Little Round Top.

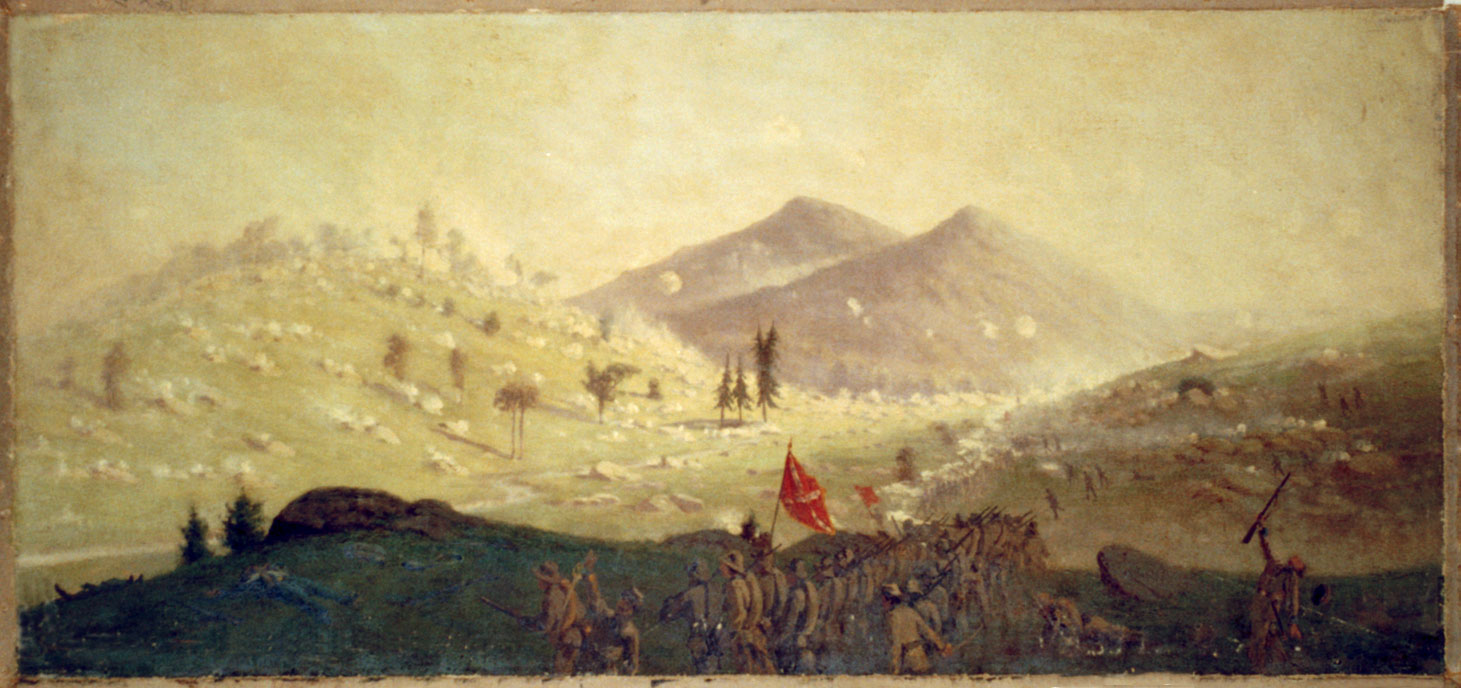
Attack on Little Round Top held by the 5th Corps commanded by General Sykes, painting by Edwin Forbes. Forbes has incorrectly depicted [Big] Round Top with two peaks.

There were four probable reasons for the deviation in the division's direction: first, regiments from the Union III Corps were unexpectedly in the Devil's Den area and they would threaten Hood's right flank if they were not dealt with; second, fire from the 2nd U.S. Sharpshooters at Slyder's farm drew the attention of lead elements of Brig. Gen. Evander M. Law's brigade, moving in pursuit and drawing his brigade to the right; third, the terrain was rough and units naturally lost their parade-ground alignments; finally, Hood's senior subordinate, General Law, was unaware that Hood had been wounded and he was now in command of the division, so he did not exercise control.

In the meantime, Little Round Top was undefended by Union troops. Maj. Gen. George Meade, commander of the Army of the Potomac, had ordered Maj. Gen. Daniel Sickles' III Corps to defend the southern end of Cemetery Ridge, which would have just included Little Round Top. Sickles, defying Meade's orders, moved his corps a few hundred yards west to the Emmitsburg Road and the Peach Orchard. This caused a large salient in the line, which was also too long to defend properly. His left flank was anchored in Devil's Den.

When Meade discovered this situation, he dispatched his chief engineer, Brig. Gen. Gouverneur K. Warren, to attempt to deal with the situation south of Sickles' position. Climbing Little Round Top, Warren found only a small Signal Corps station there. He saw the glint of bayonets in the sun to the southwest and realized that a Confederate assault into the Union flank was imminent. He hurriedly sent staff officers, including Washington Roebling, to find help from any available units in the vicinity.

The response to this request for help came from Maj. Gen. George Sykes, commander of the Union V Corps. Sykes quickly dispatched a messenger to order his 1st Division, commanded by Brig. Gen. James Barnes, to Little Round Top. Before the messenger could reach Barnes, he encountered Col. Strong Vincent, commander of the 3rd Brigade, who seized the initiative and directed his four regiments to Little Round Top without waiting for permission from Barnes. He and Oliver W. Norton, the brigade bugler, galloped ahead to reconnoiter and guide his four regiments into position.

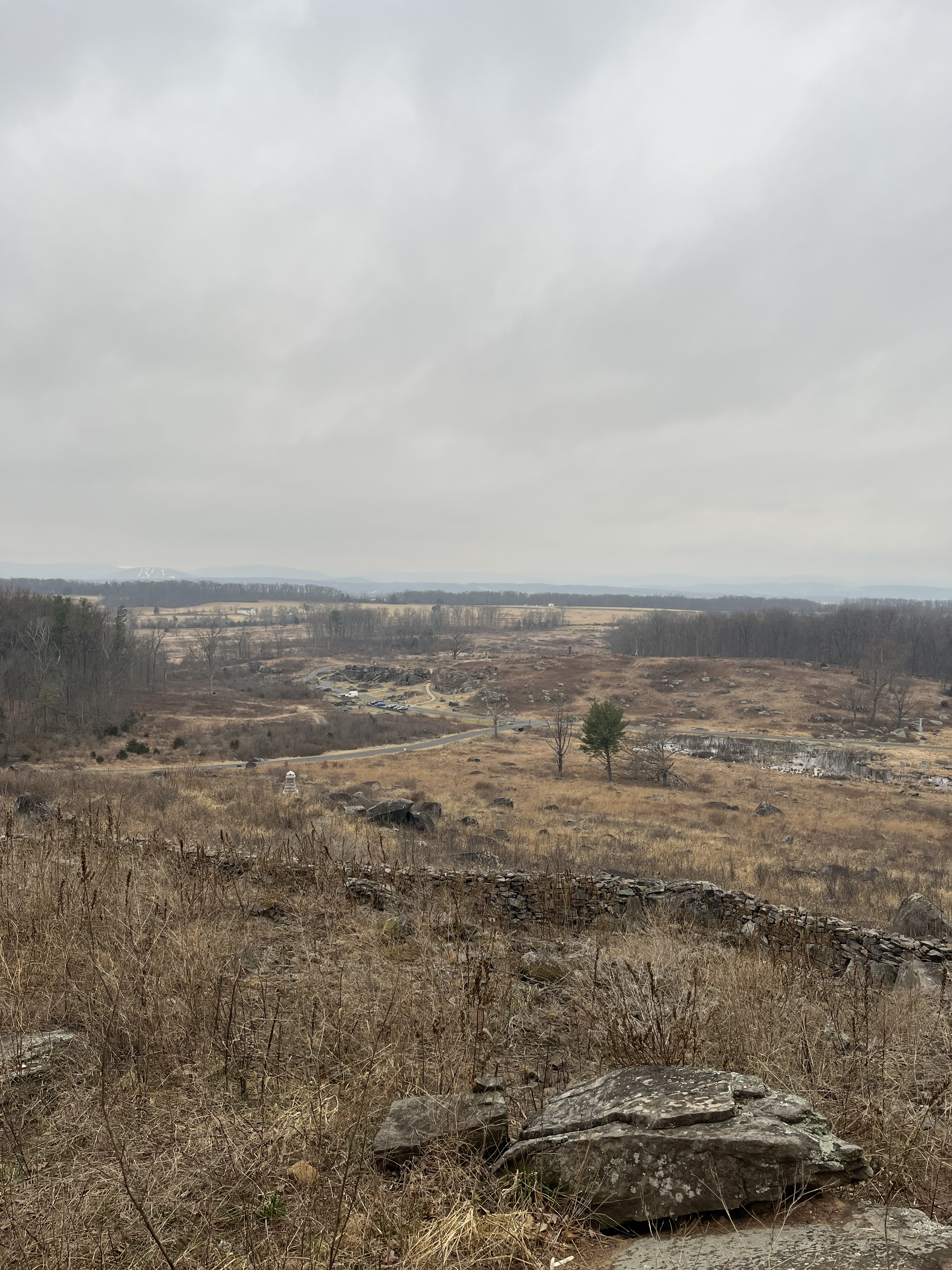
View From Little Round Top 2025

Upon arrival on Little Round Top, Vincent and Norton received fire from Confederate batteries almost immediately. On the western slope, he placed the 16th Michigan, and then proceeding counterclockwise were the 44th New York, the 83rd Pennsylvania, and finally, at the end of the line on the southern slope, the 20th Maine. Arriving only ten minutes before the Confederates, Vincent ordered his brigade to take cover and wait, and he ordered Col. Joshua Chamberlain, commander of the 20th Maine, to hold his position, the extreme left of the Army of the Potomac, at all costs. Chamberlain and his 385 men waited for what was to come.

=== Battle of Little Round Top ===
Battle of Little Round Top, initial assault Confederate Union

The approaching Confederates were the Alabama Brigade of Hood's Division, commanded by Brig. Gen. Evander M. Law. (As the battle progressed and Law realized he was in command of the division, Col. James L. Sheffield was eventually notified to assume brigade command.) Dispatching the 4th, 15th, and 47th Alabama, and the 4th and 5th Texas to Little Round Top, Law ordered his men to take the hill. The men were exhausted, having marched more than 20 miles (32 km) that day to reach this point. The day was hot and their canteens were empty; Law's order to move out reached them before they could refill their water. Approaching the Union line on the crest of the hill, Law's men were thrown back by the first Union volley and withdrew briefly to regroup. The 15th Alabama, commanded by Col. William C. Oates, repositioned further right and attempted to find the Union left flank.

The left flank consisted of the 386 officers and men of the 20th Maine regiment and the 83rd Pennsylvania. Seeing the Confederates shifting around his flank, Chamberlain first stretched his line to the point where his men were in a single-file line, then ordered the southernmost half of his line to swing back during a lull following another Confederate charge. It was there that they "refused the line"—formed an angle to the main line in an attempt to prevent the Confederate flanking maneuver. Despite heavy losses, the 20th Maine held through two subsequent charges by the 15th Alabama and other Confederate regiments for a total of ninety minutes.

Chamberlain (knowing that his men were out of ammunition, his numbers were being depleted, and his men would not be able to repulse another Confederate charge) ordered his men to fix bayonets and counterattack. He ordered his left flank, which had been pulled back, to advance in a 'right-wheel forward' maneuver. As soon as they were in line with the rest of the regiment, the remainder of the regiment would charge akin to a door swinging shut. This simultaneous frontal assault and flanking maneuver halted and captured a good portion of the 15th Alabama. While Chamberlain ordered the advance, Lieutenant Holman Melcher spontaneously and separate to Chamberlain's command initiated a charge from the center of the line that further aided the regiment's efforts.

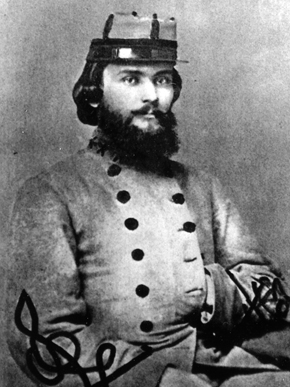
LTC William C. Oates, commander of the 15th Alabama Infantry from spring 1863 to July 1864

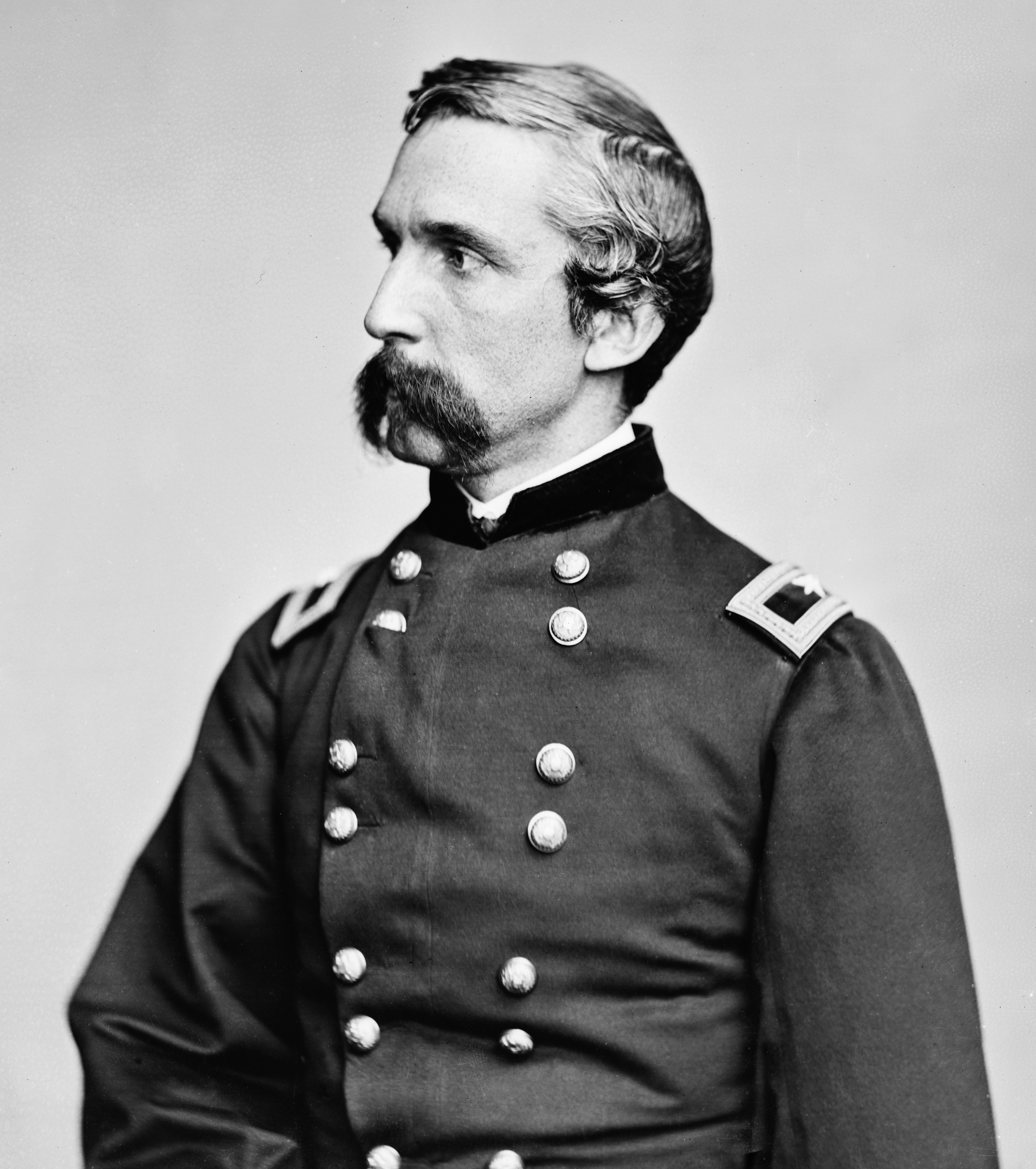
Joshua Chamberlain ordered the bayonet charge on Little Round Top.

During their retreat, the Confederates were subjected to a volley of rifle fire from Company B of the 20th Maine, commanded by Captain Walter G. Morrill, and a few of the 2nd U.S. Sharpshooters, who had been placed by Chamberlain behind a stone wall 150 yards to the east, hoping to guard against an envelopment. This group, who had been hidden from sight, caused considerable confusion in the Confederate ranks.

Thirty years later, Chamberlain received a Medal of Honor for his conduct in the defense of Little Round Top. The citation read that it was awarded for "daring heroism and great tenacity in holding his position on the Little Round Top against repeated assaults, and ordering the advance position on the Great Round Top."

Battle of Little Round Top: final assault

Despite this victory, the rest of the Union regiments on the hill were in dire straits. While the Alabamians had pressed their attacks on the Union left, the 4th and 5th Texas were attacking Vincent's 16th Michigan on the Union right. Rallying the crumbling regiment (the smallest in his brigade, with only 263 men) several times, Vincent was mortally wounded during one Texas charge and was succeeded by Colonel James C. Rice. Vincent died on July 7, but not before receiving a deathbed promotion to brigadier general.

Before the Michiganders could be demoralized, reinforcements summoned by Warren—who had continued on to find more troops to defend the hill—had arrived in the form of the 140th New York and a battery of four guns—Battery D, 5th U.S. Artillery, commanded by Lt. Charles E. Hazlett. (Simply maneuvering these guns by hand up the steep and rocky slope of the hill was an amazing achievement. However, this effort had little effect on the action of July 2. The artillerymen were exposed to constant sniper fire and could not work effectively. More significantly, however, they could not depress their barrels sufficiently to defend against incoming infantry attacks.)

The 140th charged into the fray, driving the Texans back and securing victory for the Union forces on the hill. Col. Patrick "Paddy" O'Rorke, who personally led his regiment in the charge, was killed. Reinforced further by Stephen Weed's brigade of the V Corps, Union forces held the hill throughout the rest of the battle, enduring persistent fire from Confederate sharpshooters stationed around Devil's Den. General Weed was among the victims, and as his old friend Charles Hazlett leaned over to comfort Weed, the artilleryman was also shot dead.

=== Evening and July 3 ===
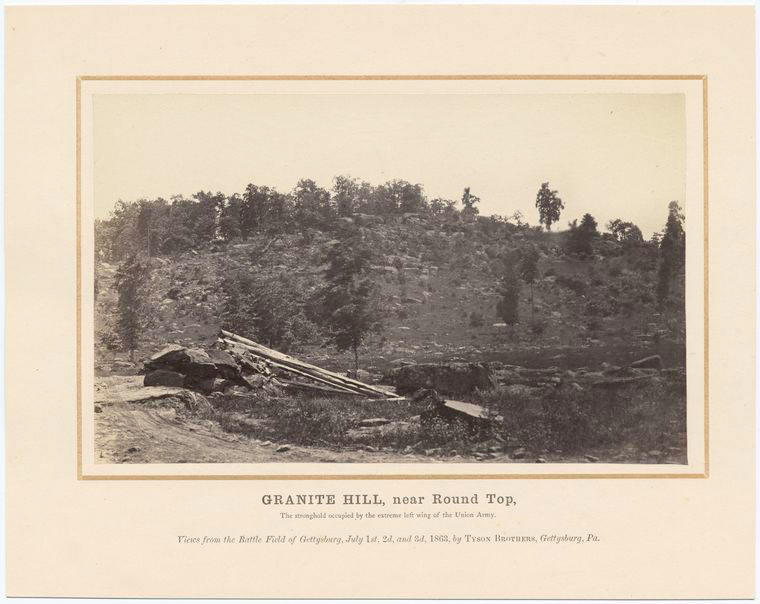
Little Round Top aka "Granite Hill" Tyson picture taken about 1863

Later that day, Little Round Top was the site of constant skirmishing. It was fortified by Weed's brigade, five regiments of the Pennsylvania Reserves, and an Ohio battery of six guns. Most of the stone breastworks that are currently visible on the hill were constructed by these troops after the fighting stopped. Troops of the II, V, VI, and XII Corps passed through the area and also occupied Round Top.

Little Round Top was the starting point for a Union counterattack at dusk on July 2, conducted by the 3rd Division of the V Corps (the Pennsylvania Reserves) under Brig. Gen. Samuel W. Crawford, launched to the west in the direction of the Wheatfield.

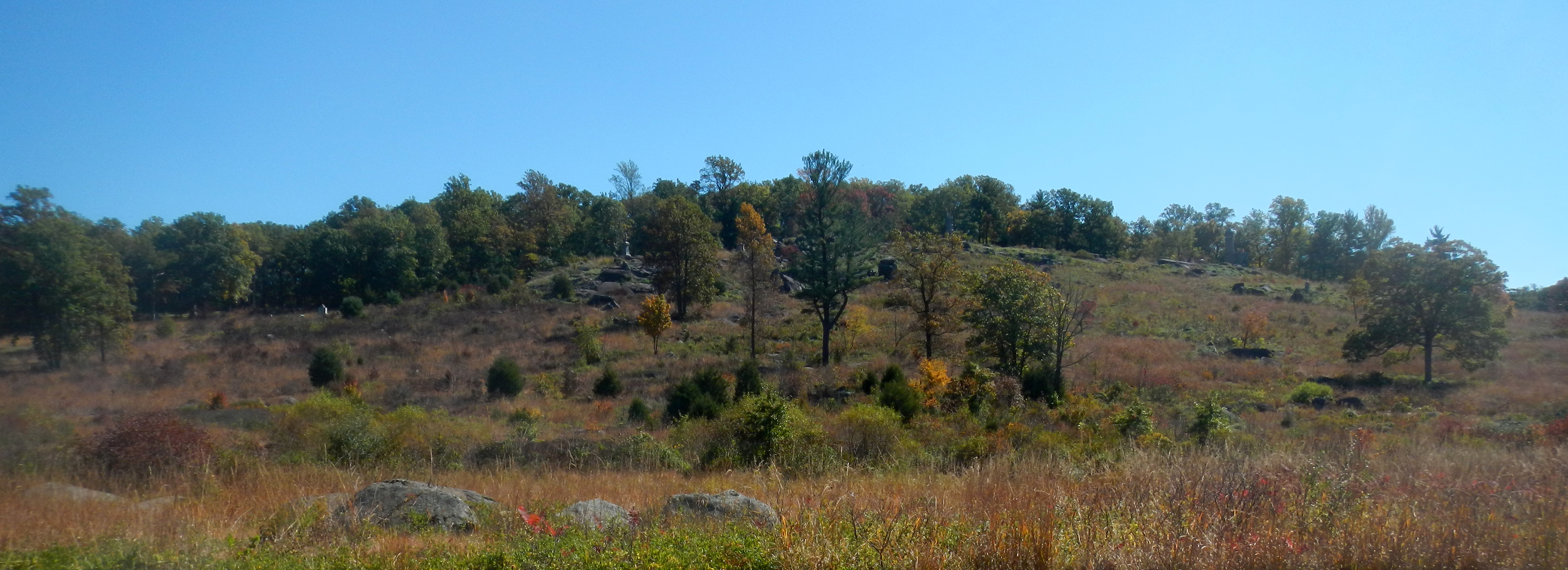
Little Round Top viewed from near Devil's Den

On July 3, Hazlett's battery (six 10-pounder Parrott rifles, now under the command of Lt. Benjamin F. Rittenhouse) fired into the flank of the Confederate assault known as Pickett's Charge. Near the end of that engagement, General Meade observed from Little Round Top and contemplated his options for a possible counterattack against Lee.

=== Impact ===
Of the 2,996 Union troops engaged at Little Round Top, there were 565 casualties (134 killed, 402 wounded, 29 missing); Confederate losses of 4,864 engaged were 1,185 (279 killed, 868 wounded, 219 missing).

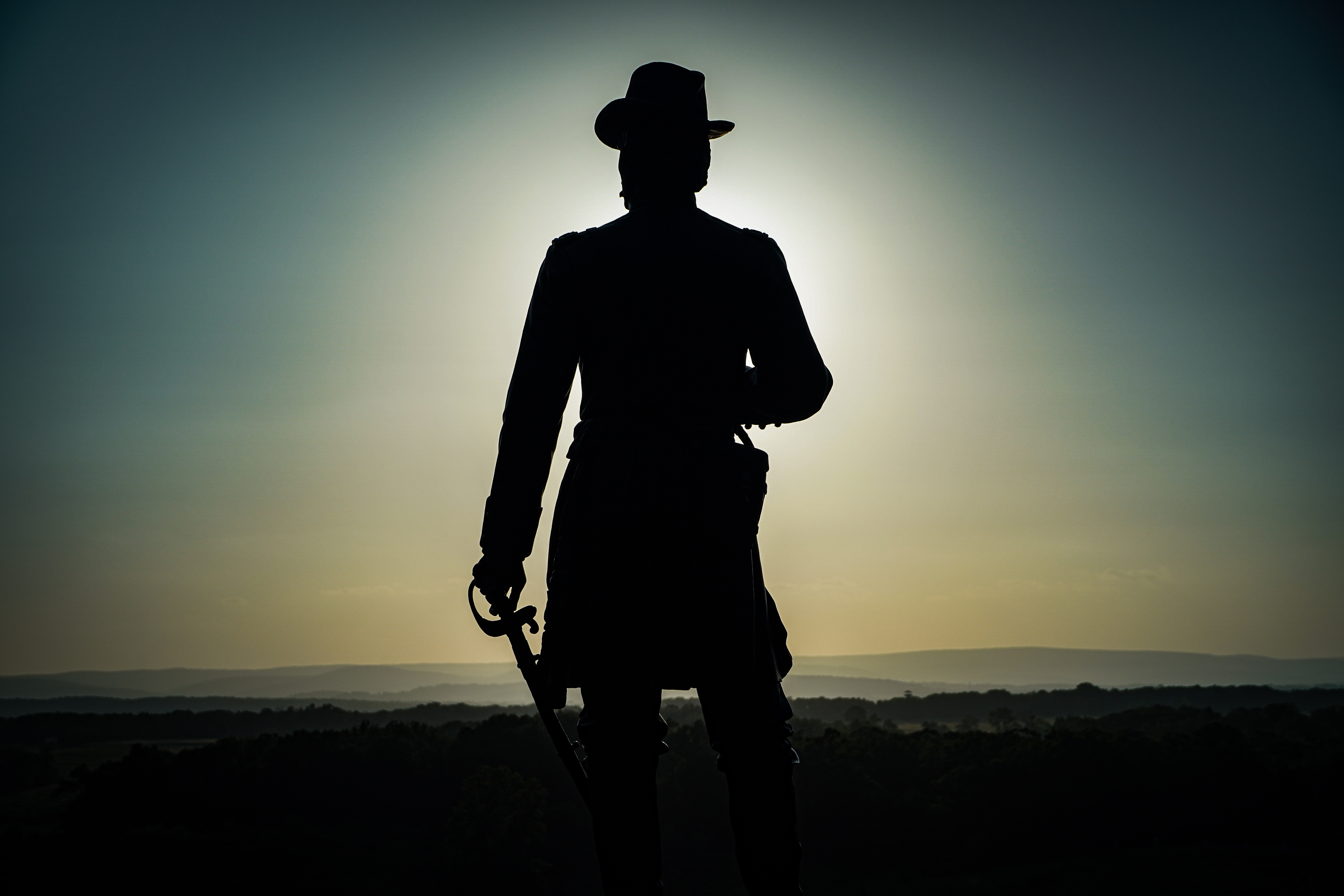
General Gouverneur K. Warren statue at sunset on the 163 anniversary of the battle of Gettysburg 2026.

While agreeing that the fighting on Little Round Top was extremely fierce and soldiers on both sides fought valiantly, historians disagree as to the impact of this particular engagement on the overall outcome of the Battle of Gettysburg. The traditional view—one that emerged in the 1880s—is that the left flank of the Union Army was a crucial position. An example of this view is from 1900: "If the Confederates had seized [Little Round Top] and dragged some of their artillery up there, as they easily could have done, they would have enfiladed Meade's entire line and made it too unhealthy for him to remain there."

An alternative claim is that the hill's terrain offered a poor platform for artillery, and that had Longstreet secured the hill, the Union Army would have been forced back to a better defensive position, making the attack on the hill a distraction from the Confederates' true objective. This latter theory is supported by General Lee's writings, in which he appears to have considered Little Round Top irrelevant. In Lee's report after the Gettysburg campaign, he stated in part, "General Longstreet was delayed by a force occupying the high, rocky hills on the enemy's extreme left, from which his troops could be attacked in reverse as they advanced", suggesting Longstreet was ordered on a course intended to bypass Little Round Top—had the hill been a key objective of the assault, Lee would not have used the phrase "delayed by" in describing the effects of the engagement.

Garry Adelman has countered the argument that a Confederate capture of Little Round Top would have badly hurt the Union effort. Examining the number of troops available in the vicinity in the late afternoon, he determined that at most 2,650 Confederates could have been available to defend the hill after capturing it, and that these men would have been exhausted from combat and short on ammunition. In contrast, 11,600 fresh Union reinforcements were available within a mile, primarily from Maj. Gen. John Sedgwick's VI Corps. In addition, the value of Little Round Top as an artillery position has been overstated—the shape of the crest of the hill forces guns to be placed one behind the other, limiting their effectiveness when engaging targets directly to the north, such as the Union line on Cemetery Ridge.

While Chamberlain and the 20th Maine have gained popularity in the American national consciousness, other historical figures such as Strong Vincent, Patrick O'Rourke, and Charles Hazlett arguably played equal roles in the Union success at Little Round Top. Their deaths at the scene, however, did not allow their personal stories to be told.

== Postbellum history ==
During visits by 13 generals in 1865, points were identified on Little Round Top at which markers were subsequently erected, and a 40 ft (12 m) observatory was built by 1886, before a stone monument with observation deck was dedicated to the 44th New York in 1892. In the late 1880s, the 20th Maine Volunteer Infantry Regiment monument on Little Round Top was dedicated with a speech by Joshua Chamberlain.

In 1935, two "hairpin curves" of the avenue on Little Round Top were removed by the Continental Contracting Company to create a "by-pass, a stretch of .399 mile," from the Round Top Museum southward to north of the guard station on the south slope at Sykes Avenue and Chamberlain Avenue was subsequently closed. The summit parking lot was also created at this time.

Monuments at Little Round Top
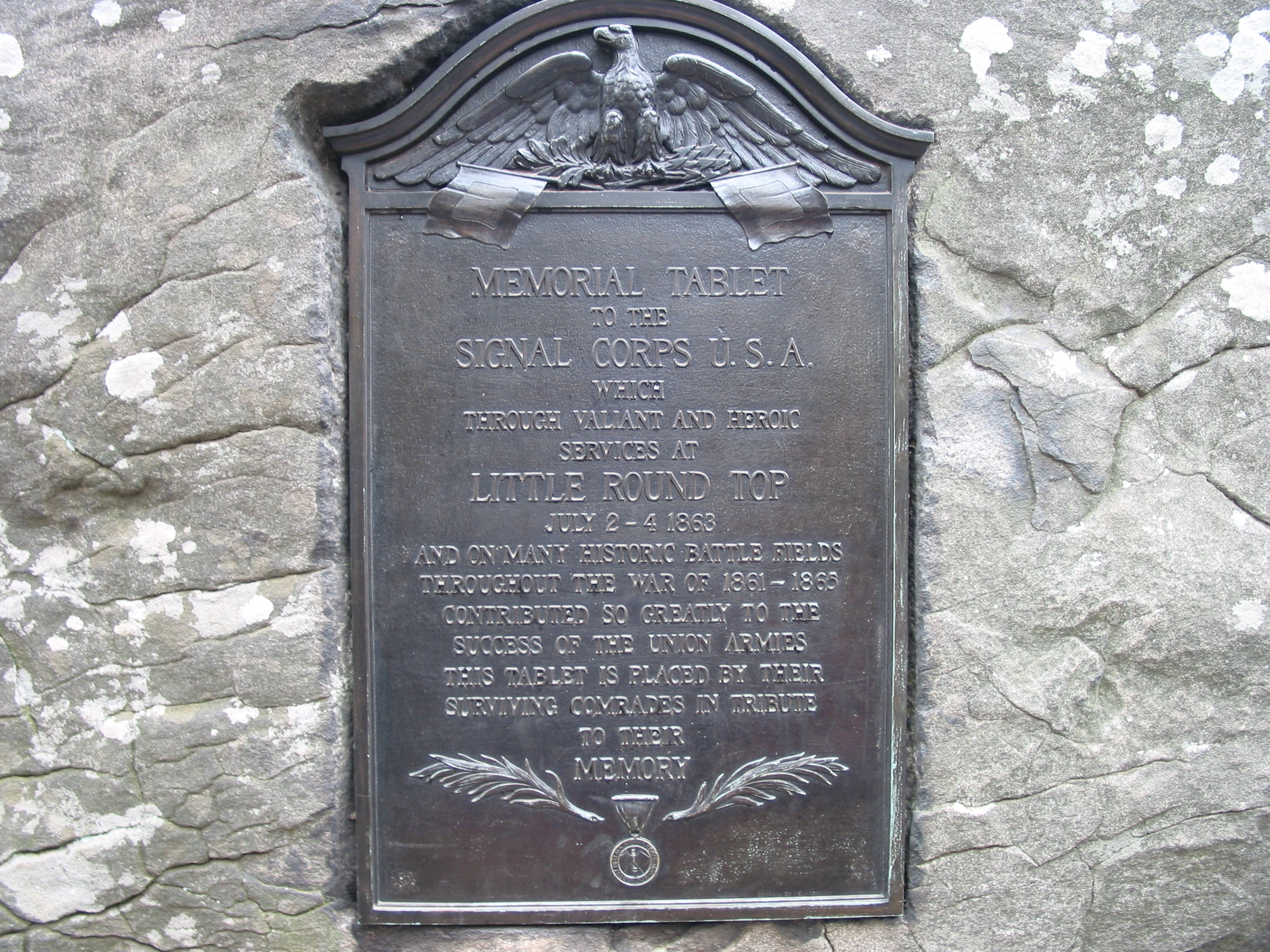
Memorial tablet to the Signal Corps embedded in the rock of Little Round Top

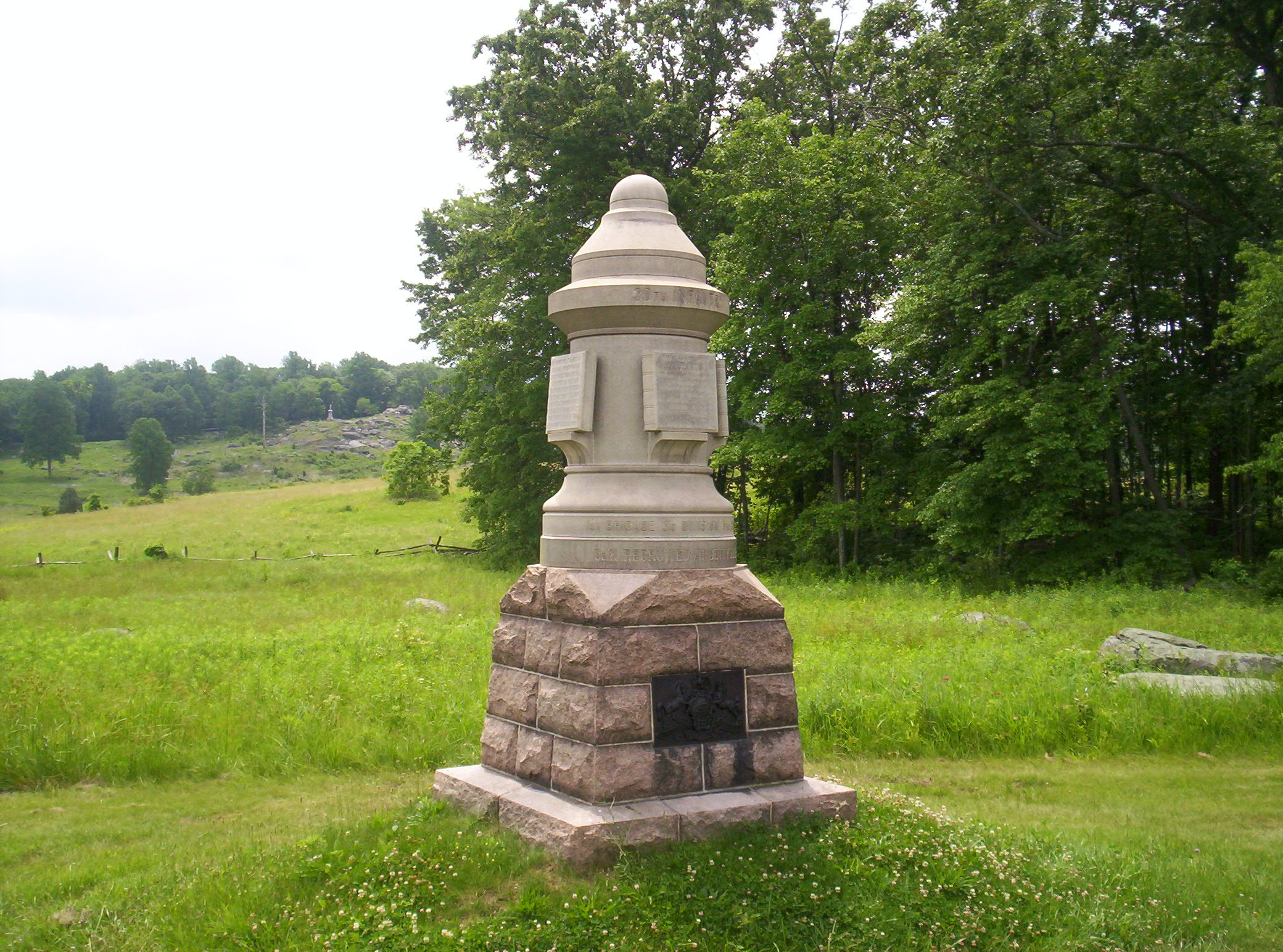
Monument for the 30th Infantry, First Pennsylvania Reserves, at the base of Little Round Top. Inscribed in the monument are the words "Co. K recruited at Gettysburg." Dedicated September 1890.

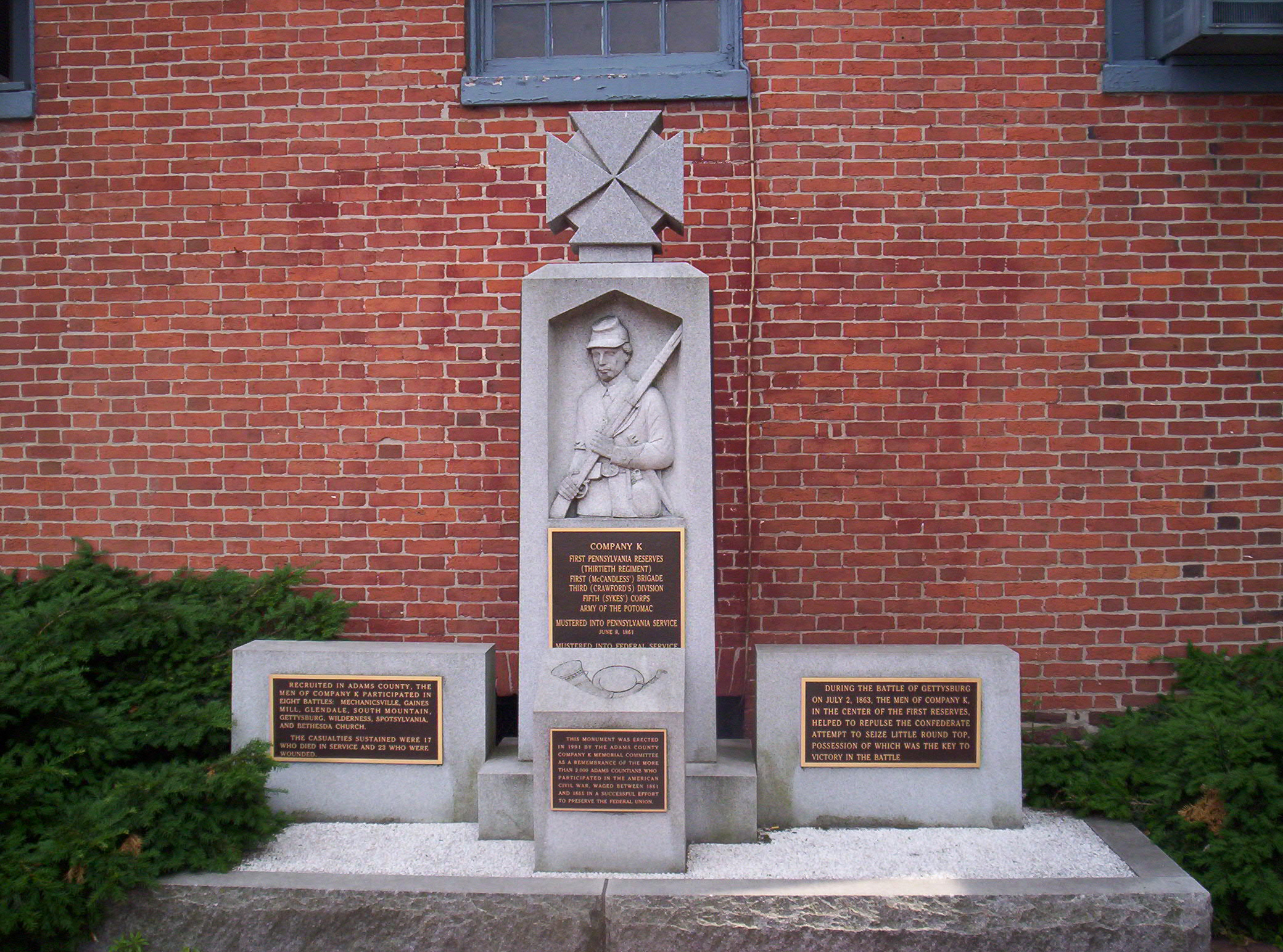
Monument in town square: "Company K, in the center of the First [Pennsylvania] Reserves, helped to repulse the Confederate attempt to seize Little Round Top, possession of which was the key to victory in the battle."

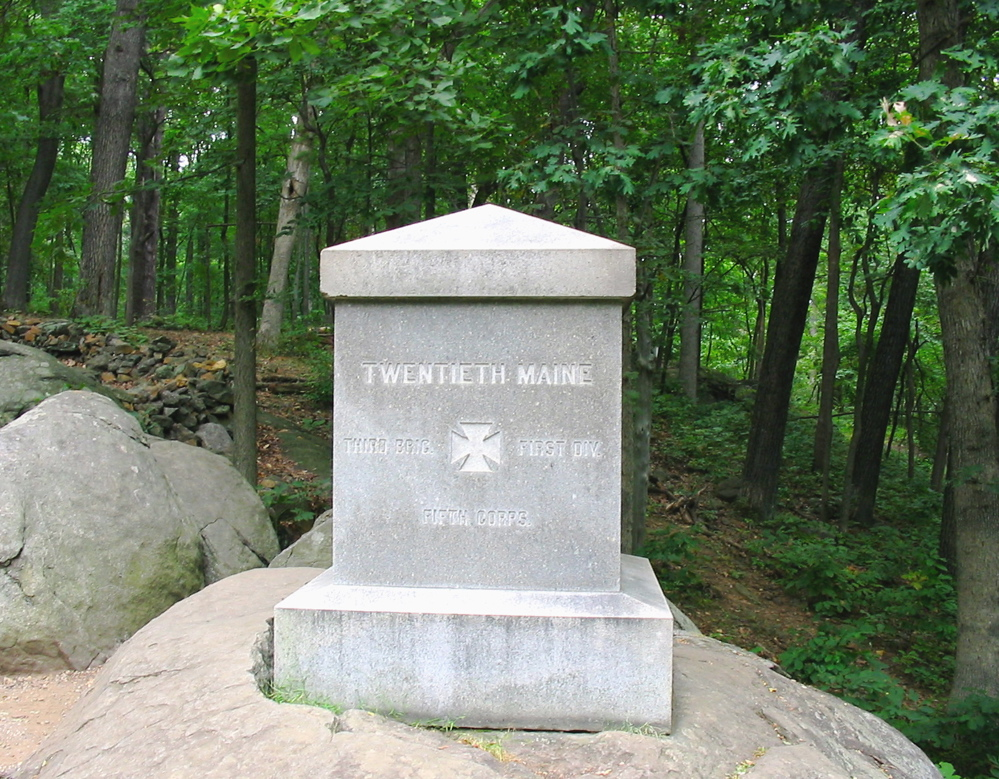
The 20th Maine Volunteer Infantry Regiment monument on Little Round Top is the most popular Gettysburg National Military Park monument that visitors request to see.

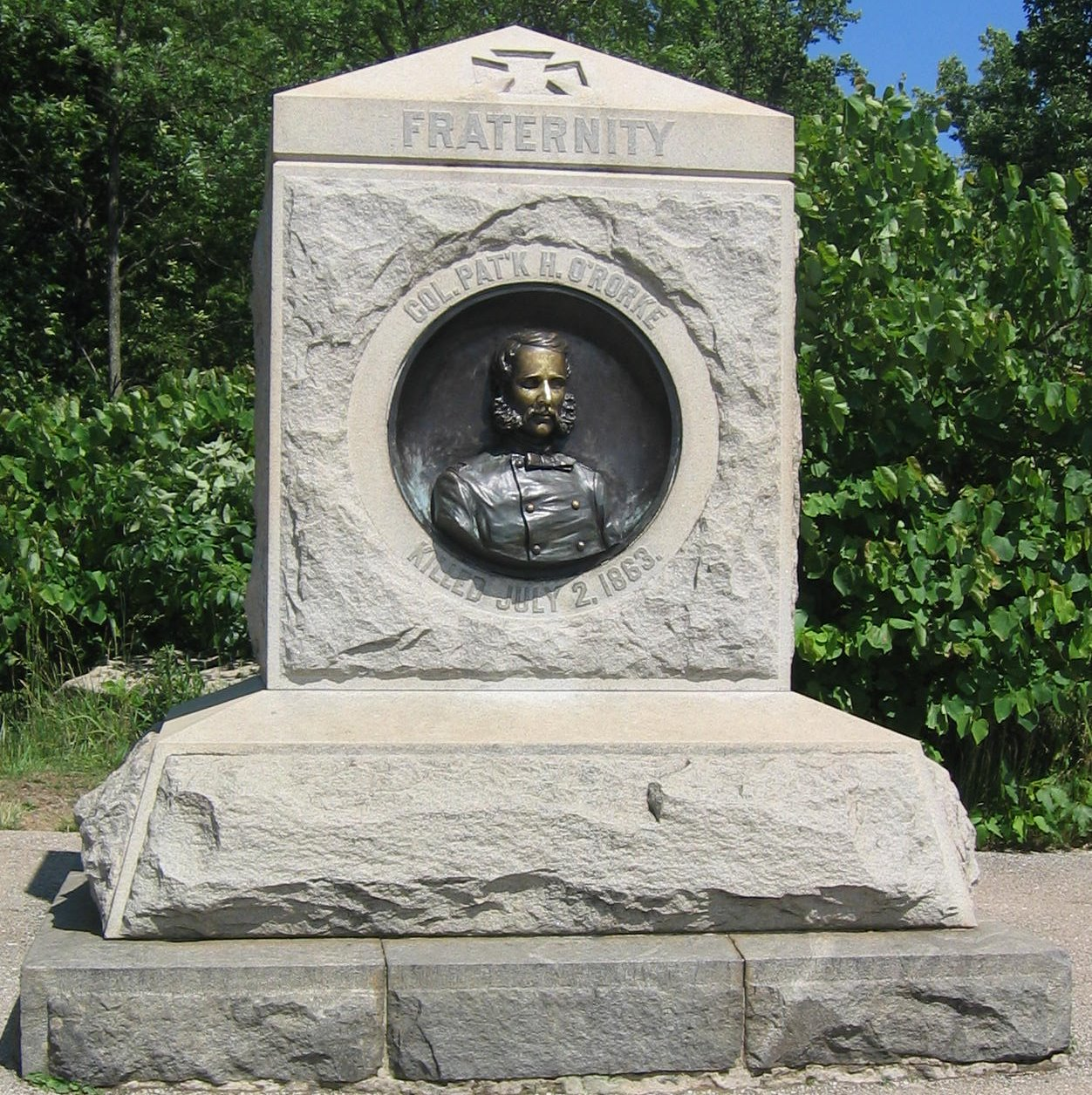
Monument to Col. Patrick O'Rorke and the 140th New York on Little Round Top

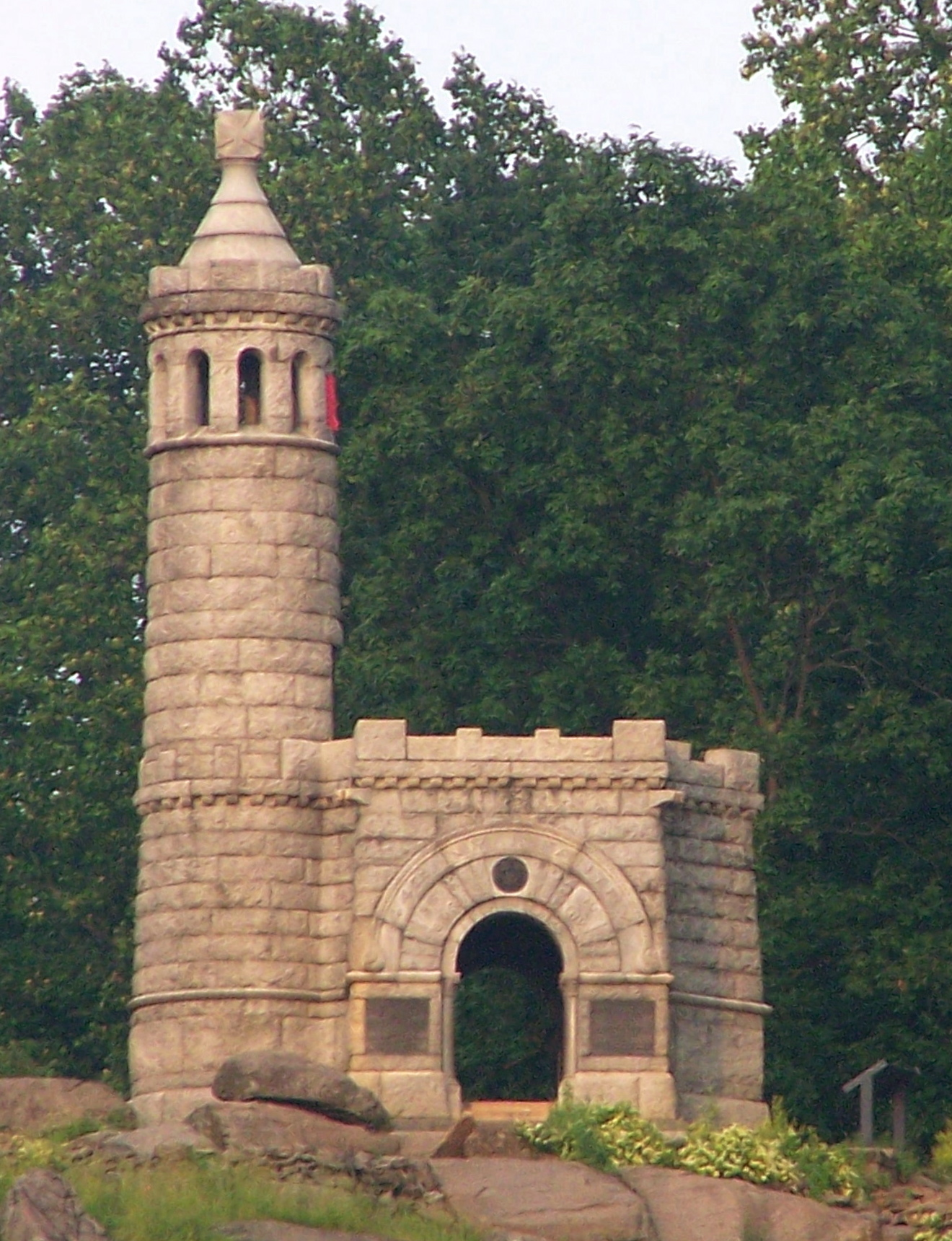
Monument to the 12th and 44th New York Infantry on Little Round Top

Monument to the 155th Pennsylvania Volunteers at Little Round Top

== In popular culture ==
The battle for Little Round Top is a key plot point of Ward Moore's 1953 alternate history novel Bring the Jubilee. The 1974 novel The Killer Angels, and its 1993 film adaptation, Gettysburg, depicted a portion of this battle. Filmmaker Ken Burns praised Chamberlain in his PBS documentary The Civil War and in subsequent interviews for possibly saving the Union with his actions during the engagement.

In the 2016 song "Ballad of the 20th Maine" by Maine folk group The Ghost of Paul Revere, the famous bayonet charge and Andrew Tozier's defiant stand is chronicled:

Well, our western flank was missing /
As the confederates, they pushed on /
And I fought them tooth and nail /
Our ammunition all but gone ...
And then appeared our Lion, he was roaring bayonets /
And we charged on down the mountain with what forces we had left /
We're as steadfast as Katahdin, we're as hard as winter's rain /
Go straight to hell with your Rebel yell, we are the boys of Maine.

== See also ==
- Big Round Top
- Gettysburg Battlefield Historic District
- Gettysburg National Military Park
