= Benjamin Rittenhouse =

U.S. Army officer (1839–1915)

Benjamin Franklin Rittenhouse
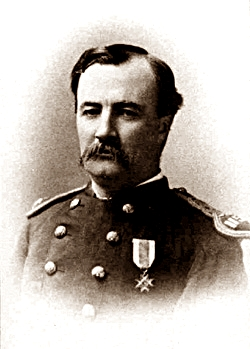
- Captain Benjamin F. Rittenhouse, 1872
- Born: December 15, 1839; Berwick, Pennsylvania, US
- Died: March 6, 1915 (aged 75); Philadelphia, Pennsylvania, US
- Burial place: Arlington National Cemetery, Arlington, Virginia
- Military career
- Allegiance: United States of America
- Branch: United States Army, Union Army
- Service years: 1861–1874
- Rank: Captain
- Commands: Battery D, 5th U.S. Artillery
- Conflicts: American Civil War: Battle of Gettysburg; Battle of the Wilderness; Battle of Spotsylvania Court House; Battle of Cold Harbor

Benjamin Franklin Rittenhouse (December 15, 1839 – March 6, 1915) was a United States Army officer, known for commanding Battery D, 5th U.S. Artillery, at the Battle of Gettysburg after his commanding officer was mortally wounded in action.

== Early life ==
Rittenhouse was born in Berwick, Pennsylvania, to Benjamin Franklin and Henrietta Waring (Davidson) Rittenhouse, the third of nine children. He received a commission in the Union Army at the outbreak of the Civil War as a second lieutenant and eventually joined Battery D, 5th United States Artillery commanded by 1st Lieutenant Charles E. Hazlett.

== Gettysburg ==
On the second day of the Battle of Gettysburg, Hazlett's Battery (3rd Division, V Corps), consisting of six 3-inch 10-pdr Parrott rifles, was rushed to the top of Little Round Top by Brig. Gen. Gouverneur K. Warren. Maneuvering the guns by hand up the steep and rocky slope of the hill was a difficult achievement. However, this effort had little effect on the action of July 2. The artillerymen were exposed to constant Confederate sniper fire and could not work the guns effectively. More significantly, they could not depress the guns' barrels sufficiently to defend against incoming infantry attacks. During the intense fighting, Hazlett was mortally wounded and command of the battery passed to Rittenhouse.

Brig. Gen. Henry Hunt, the Union chief of artillery, was with Rittenhouse when the Confederate cannonade of July 3 began. They tried to estimate the number of Confederate guns. Later, Rittenhouse was able to fire into the flank of Pickett's Charge with two guns, enfilading the right of the Confederate force.

In August 1864, Rittenhouse was brevetted to captain and to major in March 1865.

== Post-war and personal life ==
Rittenhouse was married to Elizabeth Shapter (1842–1904) in 1868 and together they had four children: Benjamin Franklin (b. 1869), Sterling (1873–1875), Elizabeth Caldwell (1877–1904), and Basil Norris (1879–1945). Rittenhouse retired from the United States Army in October 1874 at the rank of captain. He and his wife are buried in Arlington National Cemetery.

== Publications ==
- "The Battle of Gettysburg as Seen from Little Round Top: A Paper Read Before the District of Columbia Commandery of the Military Order of the Loyal Legion of the United States, May 4, 1887", War Paper 3 (Washington, DC: Judd & Detweiler), 1887
