= Charles Hazlett =

Union Army officer (1838–1863)

Charles Edward Hazlett
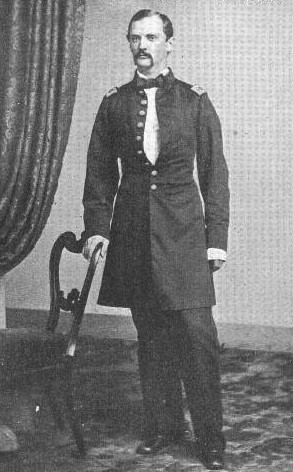
- 1st Lieutenant Charles E. Hazlett during the Civil War
- Born: October 15, 1838; Zanesville, Ohio, US
- Died: July 2, 1863 (aged 24); Gettysburg, Pennsylvania, US
- Burial place: Woodlawn Cemetery; Zanesville, Ohio, US
- Military career
- Allegiance: United States of America
- Branch: United States Army; Union Army
- Service years: 1861–1863
- Rank: 1st Lieutenant
- Commands: Battery D, 5th U.S. Artillery
- Conflicts: American Civil War; Battle of First Bull Run; Battle of Lewinsville; Siege of Yorktown; Battle of Hanover Court House; Battle of Gaines' Mill; Battle of Malvern Hill; Battle of Second Bull Run; Battle of Antietam; Battle of Shepherdstown; Battle of Fredericksburg; Battle of Chancellorsville; Battle of Gettysburg †

Charles Edward Hazlett (October 15, 1838 – July 2, 1863) was a U.S. Army First Lieutenant during the American Civil War. He was killed on Little Round Top during the second day of the Battle of Gettysburg.

== Early life ==
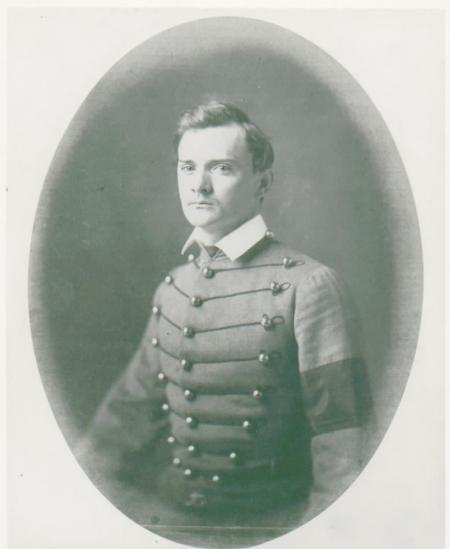
USMA Cadet Charles E. Hazlett during his final year at the academy.

Hazlett was born in Zanesville, Ohio, to Robert Hazlett and Lucy Welles Reed. Evidence suggests the family opposed slavery. His parents likely supported the American Colonization Society, and in 1859 his older brother John C. Hazlett used his position as prosecuting attorney of Muskingum County, Ohio to defend a fugitive slave captured near Zanesville.

After briefly attending Kenyon College in Gambier, Ohio, Hazlett was appointed to the United States Military Academy at West Point, New York by Edward Ball, a member of the United States House of Representatives for Ohio's 16th congressional district. He was court-martialed and forced to repeat his first year, but later graduated on May 6, 1861, fifteenth in his class.

== Civil War ==
Initially assigned to the 2nd U.S. Cavalry as a Second lieutenant, Hazlett's first role was to train members of the 69th New York Infantry Regiment at Georgetown College. After the 69th left Georgetown, he served as an aide to Joseph K. Mansfield, the commander of the Department of Washington. In May 1861, he was promoted to 1st lieutenant and later requested transfer to Battery D, 5th U.S. Artillery under Capt. Charles Griffin, his artillery instructor at West Point.

Hazlett served with the battery during its near annihilation at the First Battle of Bull Run, fought through the battles of the Peninsula Campaign and was in command of the battery by the Second Battle of Bull Run. Under his command, the unit also participated in the battles of Antietam, Shepherdstown, Fredericksburg, and Chancellorsville.

== Gettysburg ==
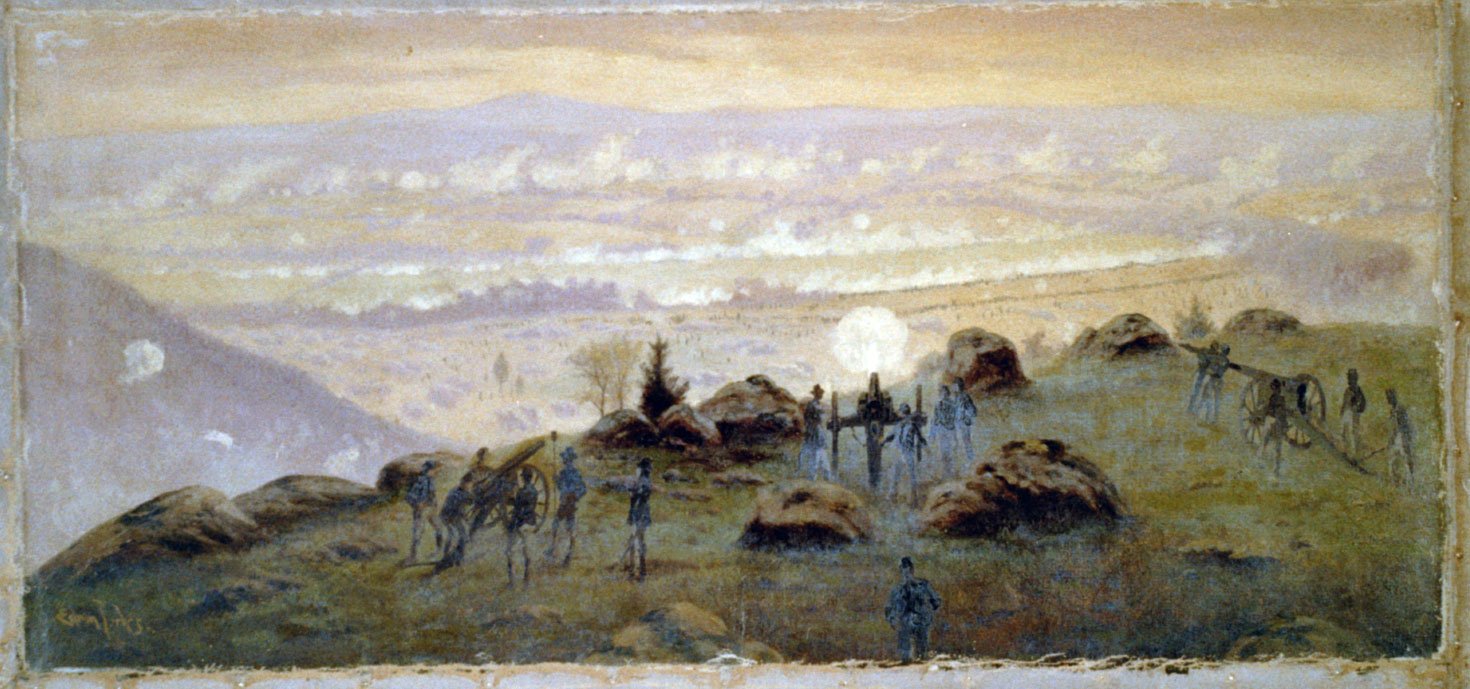
View from Little Round Top July 3rd 1863 at 7:30 PM by Edwin Forbes

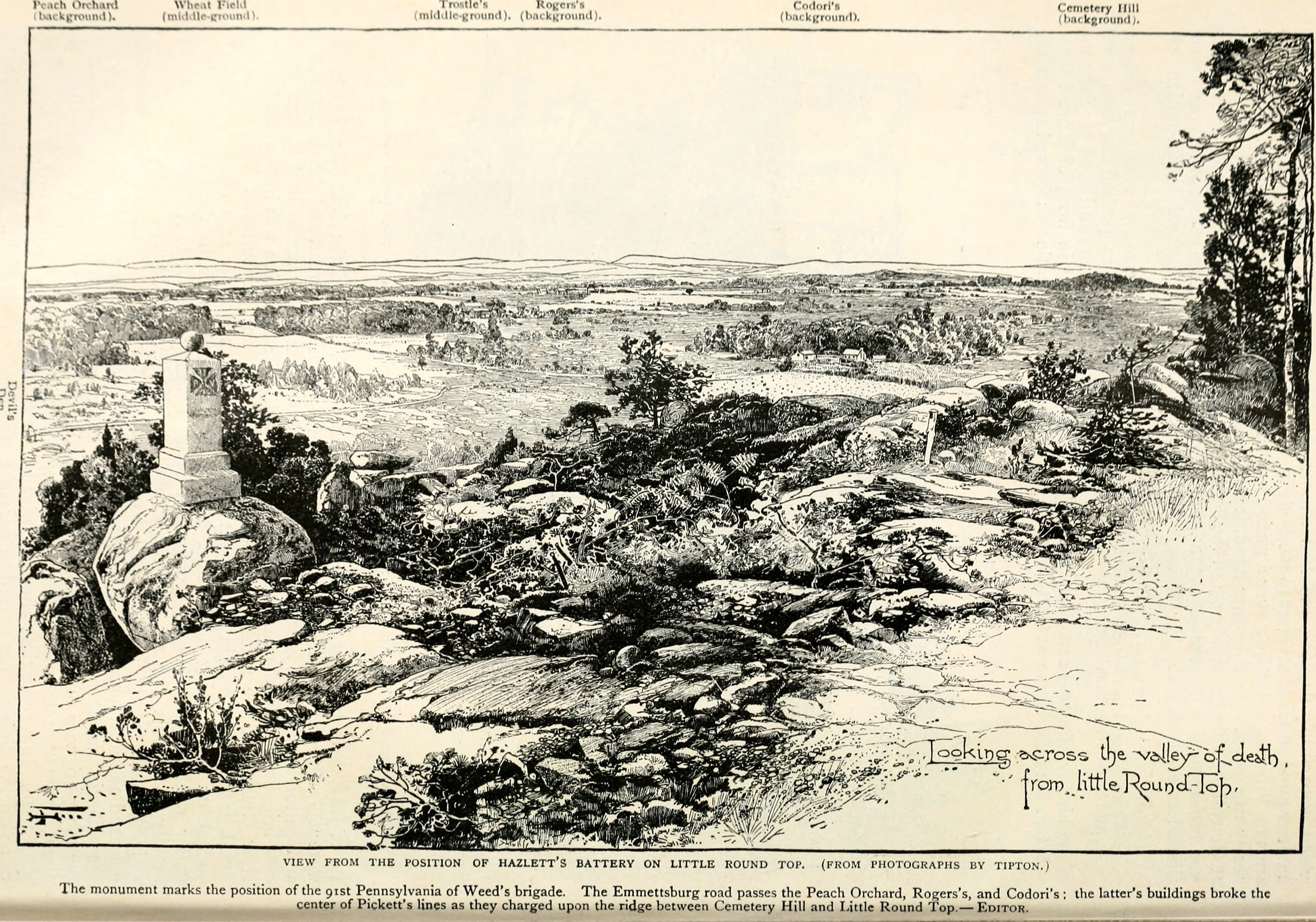
Looking from the position of Hazlett's Battery on Little Round Top toward the Valley of Death

On the second day of the Battle of Gettysburg, Hazlett's Battery (3rd Division, V Corps), consisting of six three inch, 10 pounder Parrott rifles, rushed to the top of Little Round Top where they met Brig. Gen. Gouverneur K. Warren. Maneuvering the guns up the hill was a difficult achievement, and the artillerymen were exposed to Confederate sniper fire once in position. Furthermore, they could not depress the cannons' barrels sufficiently enough to strike attackers on the slopes of the hill, though they successfully targeted enemy troops in the distance and offered moral support to federal troops in the vicinity.

While standing near the battery during the intense fighting, Brig. Gen. Stephen H. Weed fell mortally wounded and asked to see Hazlett. According to the earliest eyewitness accounts, Hazlett came to his aid and was shot in the head as he knelt down to hear what Weed was saying. Command of the battery passed to 2nd Lt Benjamin F. Rittenhouse.

An ambulance carried Hazlett to a field hospital at the Jacob Weikert house on Taneytown Road where he died later in the evening. According to Malbone Watson, a friend and West Point classmate who was carried to the hospital after being wounded leading Battery I, 5th U.S. Artillery, Hazlett's body lay on the porch of the house through the night with the bodies of Weed, and Col. Patrick O'Rorke.

== Burial ==
Hazlett's body was originally buried in a garden at the Weikert house. Later, his body was reinterred at Woodlawn Cemetery in Zanesville, Ohio.

== In memoriam ==
Four months after Hazlett's death, the U.S. War Department named a redoubt near Portsmouth, Virginia, in his honor.

A 19th-century rock carving on Little Round Top supposedly designates the spot where Hazlett was killed. A stone marker sitting atop the rock memorializes both him and Brig. Gen. Stephen Weed.

After the Civil War, veterans formed a local chapter of the Grand Army of the Republic in Hazlett's hometown. The chapter was named Hazlett Post 81 in honor of Hazlett and his brother, Capt. John C. Hazlett, who died in June 1863 after being wounded leading an infantry company at the Battle of Stones River.

In 2011, local Civil War enthusiasts replaced the Hazlett brothers' broken tombstones at Woodlawn Cemetery in Zanesville, Ohio. The city designated May 14, 2011, "Hazlett Day" in honor of the event.
