= Charles Griffin =

Union Army general

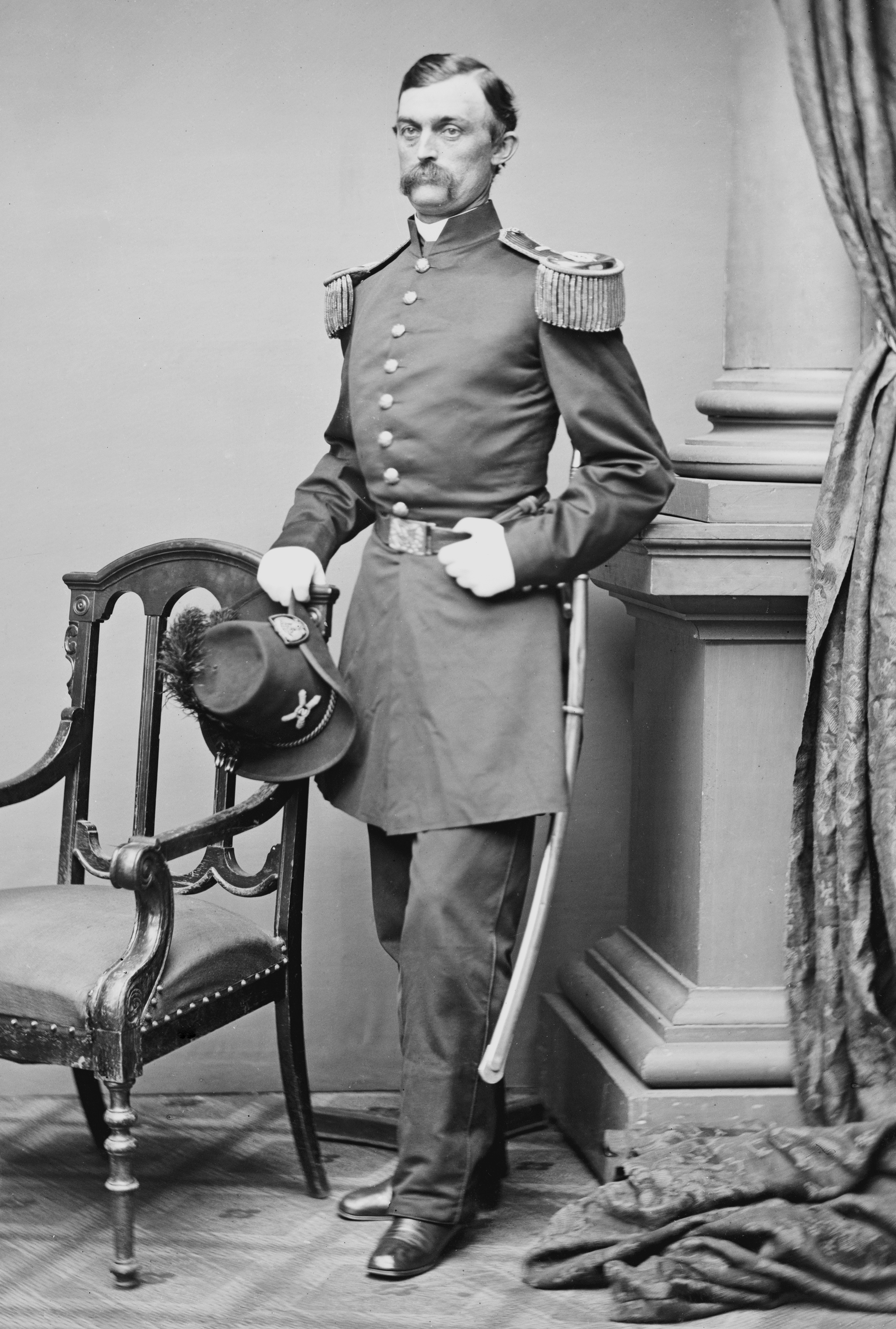
- Born: December 18, 1825; Granville, Ohio, U.S.
- Died: September 15, 1867 (aged 41); Galveston, Texas, U.S.
- Burial place: Oak Hill Cemetery; Washington, D.C., D.C.
- Military career
- Allegiance: United States of America; Union
- Branch: United States Army; Union Army
- Service years: 1847–1867
- Rank: Major General
- Commands: V Corps
- Conflicts: Mexican–American War; American Indian Wars; American Civil War; First Battle of Bull Run; Peninsula Campaign; Second Battle of Bull Run; Battle of Antietam; Battle of Fredericksburg; Battle of Chancellorsville; Battle of Gettysburg; Overland Campaign; Siege of Petersburg; Battle of Five Forks; Appomattox Campaign

Charles Griffin (December 18, 1825 – September 15, 1867) was a career officer in the United States Army and a Union general in the American Civil War. He rose to command a corps in the Army of the Potomac and fought in many of the key campaigns in the Eastern Theater.

After the war, he commanded the Department of Texas during Reconstruction. He was an ardent supporter of the Congressional policies of the Radical Republicans and of freedmen's rights, and controversially disqualified a number of state officeholders in Texas who had supported the Confederate States of America, replacing them with loyal Unionists.

== Early life and career ==
Griffin was born in Granville, Ohio, the son of Apollos Griffin. He attended the nearby Kenyon College in Gambier, and graduated from the U.S. Military Academy in West Point, New York, placing 23rd out of 38 in the Class of 1847. Commissioned as a brevet second lieutenant, he served with the 2nd U.S. Artillery during the final campaign of the Mexican–American War.

He was promoted to first lieutenant in 1849 and served in the New Mexico Territory against Navajo Indians until 1854, when he left the Southwest frontier and then taught artillery tactics at West Point, forming an artillery battery from the academy's enlisted men shortly after the Southern states began seceding from the Union.

== Civil War ==
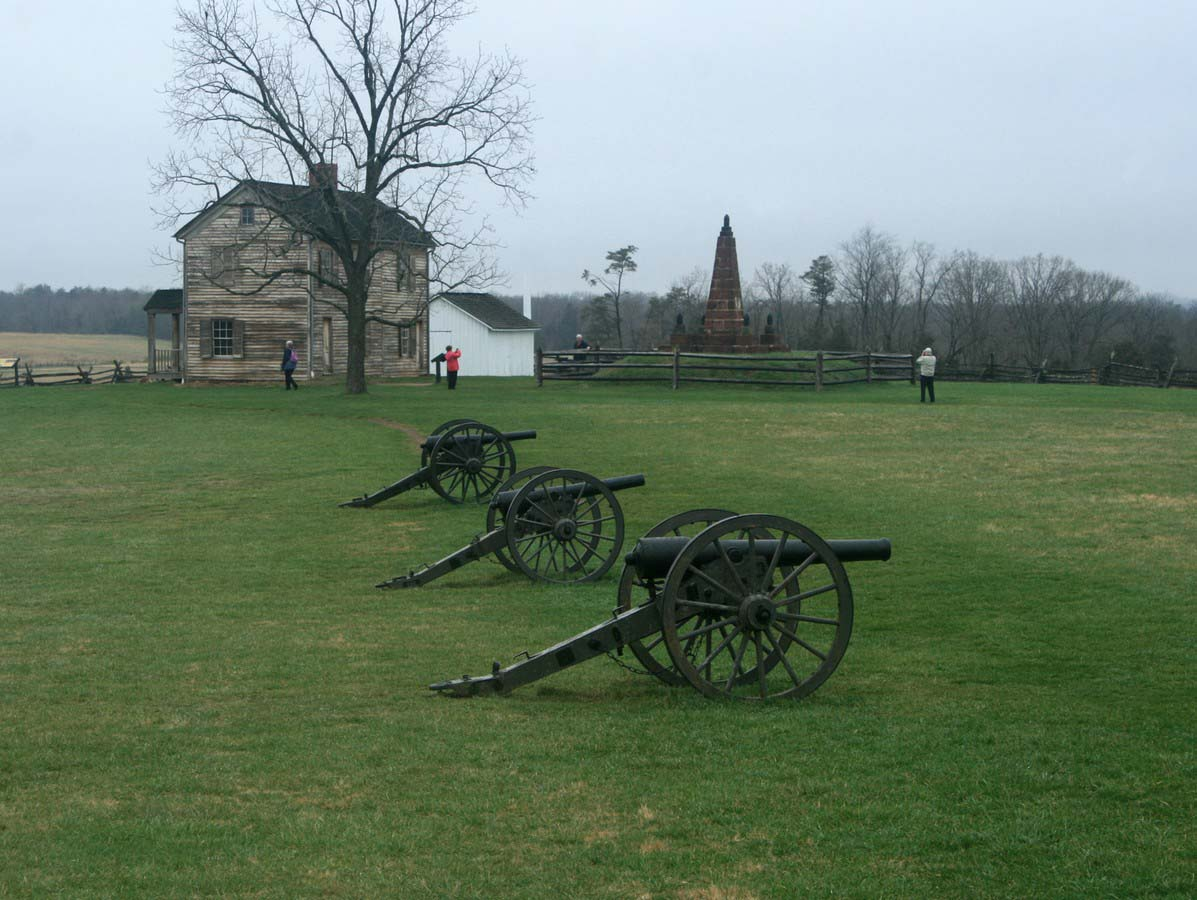
Griffin's battery at Bull Run battlefield

Griffin was promoted to captain in April 1861 and led the "West Point Battery" (officially designated as Battery D, 5th U.S. Artillery) at the First Battle of Bull Run in July. He received a brief furlough from the army and married Sallie Carroll, the scion of a prominent Maryland family, on December 10.

Griffin commanded his battery during the early part of the 1862 Peninsula Campaign but the unit was not heavily engaged during this time. He was promoted to brigadier general of volunteers on June 12, 1862, to rank from June 9 and transferred to the infantry where he got command of a brigade in the V Corps. He served with distinction at Gaines's Mill and Malvern Hill. During the Second Battle of Bull Run, his brigade was held in reserve. His men were also lightly engaged at the Battle of Antietam. Griffin's irascibility frequently led to conflict with his superiors, but his leadership abilities brought steady promotion. One famous example of Griffin's hot temper came during the Battle of the Wilderness when he was angered that his division had been driven back in disorder by a Confederate counterattack, which he said was the fault of Major General Gouverneur Warren, the commander of the V Corps, and Major General Horatio Wright, who commanded one of the VI Corps's divisions, for failing to support them properly. Commanding general Ulysses Grant's assistant adjutant general Captain John A. Rawlins accused Griffin of inappropriate and un-soldierly language. Grant, who did not know Griffin, asked Army of the Potomac commander Major General George Meade "Who is this General Gregg? You ought to arrest him." Meade replied "His name is Griffin and it's just his manner of speaking."

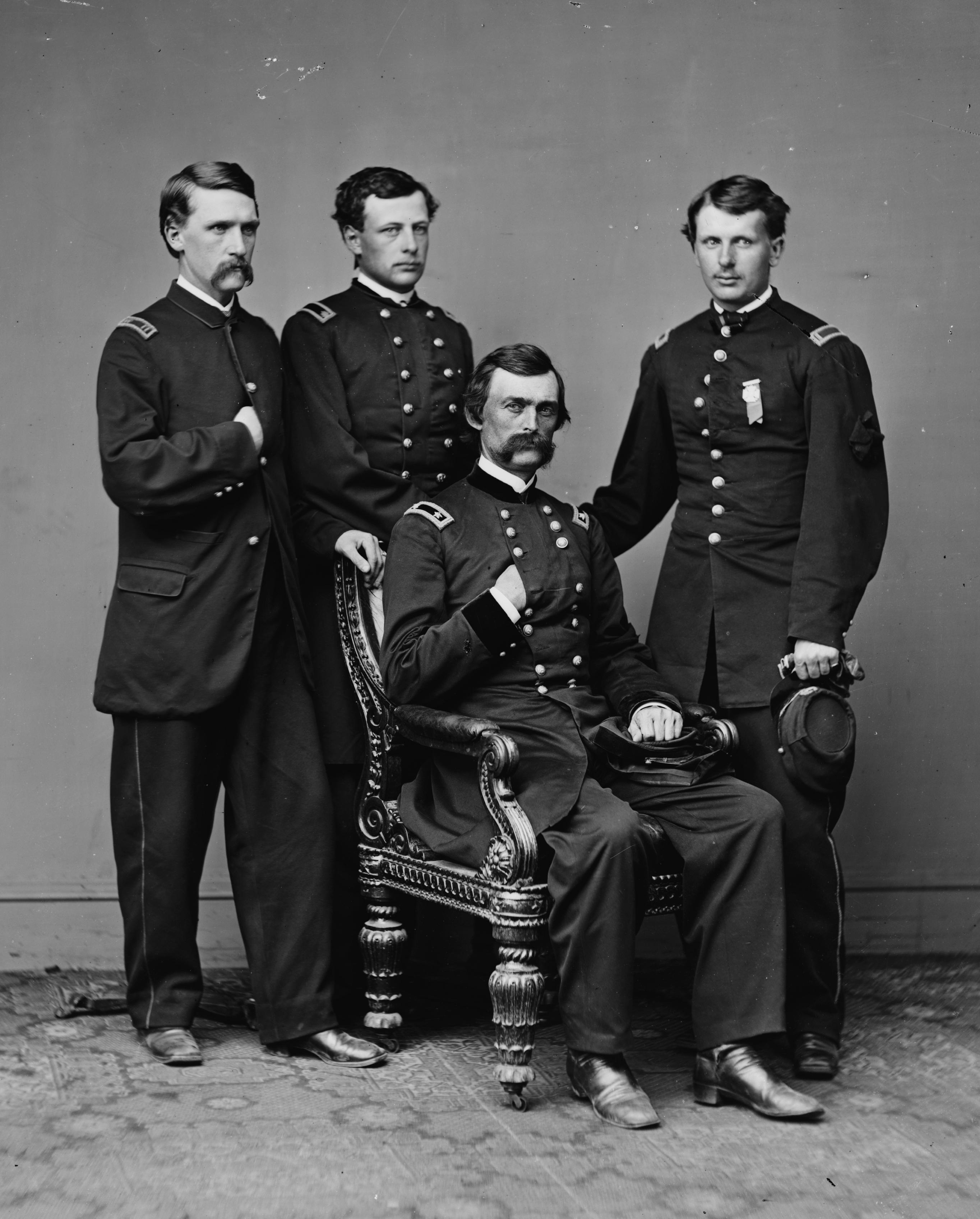
General Griffin and his staff

Assigned command of a division in the V Corps, he served at the Battle of Fredericksburg where his command lost heavily in the failed assault on Marye's Heights and during the Chancellorsville Campaign, where they were largely held in reserve. Stricken with illness, he turned over command of the division to a subordinate and did not accompany it during the early part of the Gettysburg campaign. Arriving as the Battle of Gettysburg was winding down, his return was widely celebrated by his men.

The popular officer led the division during the Bristoe Campaign, but was absent during the Mine Run Campaign when Joseph J. Bartlett commanded the division.

Griffin participated in most of the major battles of the Army of the Potomac in 1864, including the Overland Campaign and Siege of Petersburg. On December 12, 1864, President Abraham Lincoln nominated Griffin for appointment as a brevet major general of volunteers, to rank from August 1, 1864, and the United States Senate confirmed the appointment on February 14, 1865.

Griffin assumed command of V Corps during its final campaign and was present when Robert E. Lee surrendered at Appomattox Court House. In August, he was assigned command of the district of Maine, with his headquarters in Portland.

On July 12, 1865, Griffin was appointed major general of volunteers to rank from April 2, 1865. On July 17, 1866, President Andrew Johnson nominated Griffin for appointment as a brevet major general in the regular army, to rank from March 13, 1865, for his service at the Battle of Five Forks and the United States Senate confirmed the appointment on July 23, 1866.

== Postwar ==
Griffin mustered out of the volunteer service in January 1866 and was given the regular army rank of colonel in command of the 35th US Infantry. He briefly commanded the Department of Maine before being sent west to Galveston, Texas. He served as assistant commissioner of the Freedmen's Bureau for Texas in 1867, serving under Philip H. Sheridan.

He became entangled in political issues and registered both black and white voters under the Reconstruction Acts in the spring of that year. He strictly enforced the ironclad oath of allegiance (forcing men to publicly swear that they had never served the Confederacy) as the basis for jury selection. Dissatisfied with the performance of appointed Governor James W. Throckmorton, Griffin persuaded General Sheridan to remove him from office and replace him with a Republican and loyal Unionist, Elisha M. Pease. Together, they used their power and position to remove several Democratic state officeholders who had supported the Confederacy, replacing them with other Unionists.

Griffin was assigned command of the Fifth Military District, replacing Sheridan, and was ordered to report to New Orleans. However, before he could leave for Louisiana and his new headquarters, he died in September 1867 when Texas was struck by a yellow fever epidemic. He is buried at Oak Hill Cemetery in Washington, D.C.

Fort Griffin on the Texas frontier was later named in his honor.

== See also ==
- List of American Civil War generals (Union)

== Notes ==
Military offices
Preceded by George Meade	Commander of the Fifth Army Corps; January 26, 1863 – February 1, 1863	Succeeded by George Sykes
Preceded by Gouverneur K. Warren	Commander of the Fifth Army Corps; April 1, 1865 – June 28, 1865	Succeeded by none (end of war)
