= 5th U.S. Artillery, Battery D =

5th U.S. Light Artillery, Battery "D"
- Active: 1861–1865
- Country: United States
- Allegiance: Union
- Branch: Field Artillery Branch (United States)
- Engagements: Siege of Yorktown; Seven Days Battles; Battle of Beaver Dam Creek; Battle of Gaines's Mill; Battle of Malvern Hill; Battle of Antietam; Battle of Fredericksburg; Battle of Chancellorsville; Battle of Gettysburg; Bristoe Campaign; Mine Run Campaign; Battle of the Wilderness; Battle of Spotsylvania Court House; Battle of North Anna; Battle of Totopotomoy Creek; Battle of Cold Harbor; Siege of Petersburg; Battle of Globe Tavern; Appomattox Campaign; Battle of Lewis's Farm; Battle of White Oak Road; Battle of Five Forks; Battle of Appomattox Court House

Battery "D" 5th Regiment of Artillery ("West Point Battery") was a light artillery battery that served in the Union Army during the American Civil War.

== Service ==
The battery was organized on January 7, 1861, at the U.S. Military Academy at West Point, and was known as the "West Point Battery". It was initially commanded by Lt. Charles Griffin, with four guns and 70 men, and left West Point on January 31, 1861. On July 4, 1861, it was formally designated as Battery D, 5th U.S. Artillery. The battery fought in the first battle of Bull Run on July 21, 1861.

The battery was attached to Porter's Division, Army of the Potomac, October 1861 to March 1862. Artillery, 1st Division, III Corps, Army of the Potomac, to May 1862. Artillery, 1st Division, V Corps, Army of the Potomac, to May 1863. Artillery Brigade, V Corps, to December 1863. Camp Barry, Washington, D.C., XXII Corps, to March 1864. Artillery Brigade, V Corps, to November 1864. Consolidated with Battery "G", 5th U.S. Light Artillery, November 1864. Artillery Reserve, Army of the Potomac, to June 1865. Department of Washington, XXII Corps, to October 1865.

== Detailed service ==
Rockville Expedition June 10-July 7, 1861. Duty in the defenses of Washington until March 1862. Lewinsville, Va., September 11, 1861. Reconnaissance to Lewinsville September 25. Edward's Ferry October 22. Ordered to the Virginia Peninsula March 1862. Howard's Mills April 4. Warwick Road April 5. Siege of Yorktown April 5-May 4. Hanover Court House May 27. Operations about Hanover Court House May 27–29. Seven Days Battles before Richmond June 25-July 1. Mechanicsburg June 26. Gaines's Mill June 27. Turkey Bridge June 30. Malvern Hill July 1. At Harrison's Landing until August 16. Moved to Fort Monroe, then to Alexandria August 16–23. Maryland Campaign September 6–22. Battle of Antietam September 16–17. Shepherdstown Ford September 19. Reconnaissance to Smithfield, Va., October 16–17. Kearneysville and Shepherdstown October 16–17. Battle of Fredericksburg, Va., December 12–15. Expedition from Potomac Creek to Richards and Ellis Fords, Rappahannock River, December 29–30. Chancellorsville Campaign April 27-May 6. Battle of Chancellorsville May 1–5. Gettysburg Campaign June 11-July 24. Battle of Gettysburg July 1–3. Bristoe Campaign October 9–22. Advanced to line of the Rappahannock November 7–8. Rappahannock Station November 7. Mine Run Campaign November 26-December 2. At Camp Barry, Washington, D.C., until March 1864. Rapidan Campaign May 4-June 12. Battle of the Wilderness May 5–7. Spotsylvania Court House May 8–21. North Anna River May 22–26. On line of the Pamunkey May 26–28. Totopotomoy May 28–31. Cold Harbor June 1–12. Bethesda Church June 1–3. Siege of Petersburg June 16, 1864 to April 2, 1865. Weldon Railroad August 18–21, 1864. Appomattox Campaign March 28-April 9, 1865. Junction of Quaker and Boydton Roads and Lewis' Farm March 29. White Oak Road March 31. Battle of Five Forks April 1. Appomattox Court House April 9. Surrender of Lee and his army. Moved to Washington, D.C., May. Grand Review of the Armies May 23. Duty at Washington, D.C., until October 1865.

== Commanders ==
- Captain Charles Griffin
- 1st Lieutenant Henry W. Kingsbury - succeeded Cpt Griffin
- 1st Lieutenant Charles E. Hazlett - succeeded 1Lt Kingsbury; killed in action at the Battle of Gettysburg
- 1st Lieutenant Benjamin F. Rittenhouse - commanded after Cpt Hazlett was killed in action at the Battle of Gettysburg
- 1st Lieutenant William E. Van Reed - succeeded 1Lt Rittenhouse
- 1st Lieutenant Jacob B. Rawles - succeeded 1Lt Van Reed

== See also ==
- List of United States Regular Army Civil War units
- 5th Air Defense Artillery Regiment
