= Battle of Antietam order of battle: Confederate =

American Civil War order of battle

The following Confederate States Army units and commanders fought in the Battle of Antietam of the American Civil War. The Union order of battle is listed separately. Order of battle compiled from the army organization during the campaign, the casualty returns and the reports.

== Abbreviations used ==
=== Military rank ===
- Gen = General
- MG = Major General
- BG = Brigadier General
- Col = Colonel
- Ltc = Lieutenant Colonel
- Maj = Major
- Cpt = Captain
- Lt = Lieutenant

=== Other ===
- (w) = wounded
- (mw) = mortally wounded
- (k) = killed in action
- (c) = captured

== Army of Northern Virginia ==
Gen Robert E. Lee

=== Right Wing ===
MG James Longstreet

Division	Brigade	Regiments and Others
McLaws' Division; MG Lafayette McLaws	Kershaw's Brigade BG Joseph B. Kershaw	2nd South Carolina: Col John D. Kennedy (w), Maj Franklin Gaillard; 3rd South Carolina: Col James D. Nance; 7th South Carolina: Col David W. Aiken (w), Cpt John S. Hard; 8th South Carolina: Ltc Axalla J. Hoole
McLaws' Division; MG Lafayette McLaws	Cobb's Brigade Ltc Christopher C. Sanders; Ltc William MacRae	16th Georgia: Ltc Philip Thomas; 24th Georgia: Maj Robert E. McMillan (w); Cobb's (Georgia) Legion: Ltc Luther Glenn; 15th North Carolina: Ltc William MacRae
McLaws' Division; MG Lafayette McLaws	Semmes' Brigade BG Paul J. Semmes	10th Georgia: Maj Willis C. Holt (w), Cpt William Johnston (w), Cpt Philologus H. Loud (w); 53rd Georgia: Ltc Thomas Sloan (mw), Cpt Samuel W. Marshborne; 15th Virginia: Cpt Emmett M. Morrison (w), Cpt Edward J. Willis; 32nd Virginia: Col Edgar B. Montague
McLaws' Division; MG Lafayette McLaws	Barksdale's Brigade BG William Barksdale	13th Mississippi: Ltc Kennon McElroy; 17th Mississippi: Ltc John C. Fiser; 18th Mississippi: Maj James C. Campbell (w), Ltc William H. Luse; 21st Mississippi: Cpt John Sims, Col Benjamin G. Humphreys
McLaws' Division; MG Lafayette McLaws	Artillery Maj Samuel P. Hamilton; Col Henry C. Cabell	Manly's (1st North Carolina, Battery A) Battery: Cpt Basil C. Manly; Pulaski (Georgia) Artillery: Cpt John P. W. Read; Richmond (Fayette) Artillery: Cpt Miles C. Macon; Richmond Howitzers, 1st Company: Cpt Edward S. McCarthy; Troup (Georgia) Artillery: Cpt Henry H. Carlton
Anderson's Division; MG Richard H. Anderson (w); BG Roger A. Pryor	Wilcox's Brigade Col Alfred Cumming (w); Maj Hilary A. Herbert; Cpt James M. Crow	8th Alabama: Maj Hilary A. Herbert; 9th Alabama: Maj Jeremiah H. Johnston (w), Cpt James M. Crow; 10th Alabama: Cpt George C. Whatley (k); 11th Alabama: Maj John C. C. Sanders
Anderson's Division; MG Richard H. Anderson (w); BG Roger A. Pryor	Mahone's Brigade Col William A. Parham	6th Virginia: Cpt John R. Ludlow; 12th Virginia; 16th Virginia; 41st Virginia; 61st Virginia
Anderson's Division; MG Richard H. Anderson (w); BG Roger A. Pryor	Featherston's Brigade Col Carnot Posey	12th Mississippi: Col William H. Taylor; 16th Mississippi: Cpt Abram M. Feltus; 19th Mississippi: Col Nathaniel H. Harris (w); 2nd Mississippi Battalion: Maj William S. Wilson (mw)
Anderson's Division; MG Richard H. Anderson (w); BG Roger A. Pryor	Armistead's Brigade BG Lewis A. Armistead (w); Col James G. Hodges	9th Virginia: Cpt William J. Richardson; 14th Virginia: Col James G. Hodges; 38th Virginia: Col Edward C. Edmonds; 53rd Virginia: Cpt William G. Pollard (k); 57th Virginia
Anderson's Division; MG Richard H. Anderson (w); BG Roger A. Pryor	Pryor's Brigade BG Roger A. Pryor; Col John C. Hately (w)	14th Alabama: Maj James A. Broome; 2nd Florida: Col William D. Ballantine (w), Lt Henry C. Geiger; 5th Florida: Col John C. Hately (w), Ltc Thomas B. Lamar (w), Maj Benjamin F. Davis; 8th Florida: Ltc Georges A. G. De Coppens (k), Cpt Richard A. Waller (k), Cpt William Baya; 3rd Virginia: Col Joseph Mayo, Jr. (w), Ltc Alexander D. Callcote
Anderson's Division; MG Richard H. Anderson (w); BG Roger A. Pryor	Wright's Brigade BG Ambrose R. Wright (w); Col Robert H. Jones (w); Col William Gibson	44th Alabama: Ltc Charles A. Derby (k), Maj William F. Perry; 3rd Georgia: Cpt Reuben B. Nisbit (w), Cpt John T. Jones; 22nd Georgia: Col Robert H. Jones (w), Cpt Lawrence D. Lallerstedt (w); 48th Georgia: Col William Gibson
Anderson's Division; MG Richard H. Anderson (w); BG Roger A. Pryor	Artillery Maj John S. Saunders	Donaldsonville (Louisiana) Artillery: Cpt Victor Maurin; Norfolk (Virginia) Artillery (Huger's Battery): Lt Charles R. Phelps; Moorman's (Virginia) Battery: Cpt Marcellus N. Moorman; Portsmouth (Virginia) Artillery: Cpt Cary F. Grimes (k); Dixie (Virginia) Artillery: Cpt William H. Chapman
Jones' Division; BG David R. Jones	Toombs' Brigade BG Robert Toombs (w); Col Henry L. Benning	2nd Georgia: Ltc William R. Holmes (k), Maj Skidmore Harris (w), Cpt Abner M. Lewis; 15th Georgia: Col William T. Millican (mw), Cpt Thomas H. Jackson; 17th Georgia: Cpt John A. McGregor; 20th Georgia: Col John B. Cumming
Jones' Division; BG David R. Jones	Drayton's Brigade BG Thomas F. Drayton	50th Georgia: Ltc Francis Kearse; 51st Georgia; Phillips' (Georgia) Legion: Maj Richard "Robert" Thomas Cook; 15th South Carolina: Col William D. DeSaussure; 3rd South Carolina Battalion: Cpt George M. Gunnels
Jones' Division; BG David R. Jones	Pickett's Brigade BG Richard B. Garnett	8th Virginia: Col Eppa Hunton; 18th Virginia: Maj George C. Cabell; 19th Virginia: Lt William N. Wood; 28th Virginia: Cpt William L. Wingfield; 56th Virginia: Cpt John B. McPhail, Jr.
Jones' Division; BG David R. Jones	Kemper's Brigade BG James L. Kemper	1st Virginia: Cpt George F. Newton, Maj William H. Palmer; 7th Virginia: Maj Arthur Herbert; 11th Virginia: Cpt Robert Miller Mitchell, Jr.; 17th Virginia: Col Montgomery D. Corse (w); 24th Virginia: Col William R. Terry
Jones' Division; BG David R. Jones	Jenkins' Brigade Col Joseph Walker	1st South Carolina (Volunteers): Ltc Daniel Livingston (w); 2nd South Carolina Rifles: Col Robert A. Thompson; 5th South Carolina: Cpt Thomas C. Beckham; 6th South Carolina: Cpt Edward B. Cantey (w); 4th South Carolina Battalion: Lt W. T. Field; Palmetto (South Carolina) Sharpshooters: Cpt Alfred H. Foster (w), Cpt Franklin W. Kirkpatrick
Jones' Division; BG David R. Jones	Jones' Brigade Col George T. Anderson	1st Georgia (Regulars): Col William J. Magill (w), Cpt Richard A. Wayne; 7th Georgia: Col George H. Carmical; 8th Georgia: Col John R. Towers; 9th Georgia: Ltc John C. L. Mounger (w); 11th Georgia: Maj Francis H. Little
Jones' Division; BG David R. Jones	Artillery	Wise (Virginia) Artillery: Cpt James S. Brown
Walker's Division; BG John G. Walker	Walker's Brigade Col Van H. Manning (w); Col Edward D. Hall	3rd Arkansas: Cpt John W. Reedy; 27th North Carolina: Col John R. Cooke (w); 46th North Carolina: Col Edward D. Hall, Ltc William A. Jenkins; 48th North Carolina: Col Robert C. Hill; 30th Virginia: Ltc Robert S. Chew (w); French's (Virginia) Battery: Cpt Thomas B. French
Walker's Division; BG John G. Walker	Ransom's Brigade BG Robert Ransom, Jr.	24th North Carolina: Ltc John L. Harris; 25th North Carolina: Col Henry M. Rutledge; 35th North Carolina: Col Matt W. Ransom; 49th North Carolina: Ltc Leroy M. McAfee; Branch's (Virginia) Battery: Cpt James R. Branch
Hood's Division; BG John B. Hood	Hood's Brigade Col William T. Wofford	18th Georgia: Ltc Solon Z. Ruff; Hampton's (South Carolina) Legion: Ltc Martin W. Gary; 1st Texas: Ltc Philip A. Work; 4th Texas: Ltc Benjamin F. Carter; 5th Texas: Cpt Ike N. M. Turner
Hood's Division; BG John B. Hood	Whiting's Brigade Col Evander M. Law	4th Alabama: Cpt Lawrence H. Scruggs (w), Cpt William M. Robbins; 2nd Mississippi: Col John M. Stone (w), Lt William C. Moody; 11th Mississippi: Ltc Samuel F. Butler (mw), Maj Taliaferro S. Evans (k); 6th North Carolina: Maj Robert F. Webb (w)
Hood's Division; BG John B. Hood	Artillery Maj Bushrod W. Frobel	German (South Carolina) Artillery: Cpt William K. Bachman; Palmetto (South Carolina) Artillery: Cpt Hugh R. Garden; Rowan (North Carolina) Artillery: Cpt James Reilly
Reporting directly	Evans' Brigade BG Nathan G. Evans; Col Peter F. Stevens (w)	17th South Carolina: Col Fitz W. McMaster; 18th South Carolina: Col William H. Wallace; 22nd South Carolina: Maj Miel Hilton; 23rd South Carolina: Lt E. R. White; Holcombe (South Carolina) Legion: Col Peter F. Stevens; Macbeth (South Carolina) Artillery: Cpt Robert Boyce
Reserve Artillery	Washington (Louisiana) Artillery Col James B. Walton	1st Company: Cpt Charles W. Squires; 2nd Company: Cpt John B. Richardson; 3rd Company: Cpt Merritt B. Miller; 4th Company: Cpt Benjamin F. Eshleman
Reserve Artillery	Lee's Battalion Col Stephen D. Lee	Ashland (Virginia) Artillery: Cpt Pichegru Woolfolk, Jr.; Bedford (Virginia) Artillery: Cpt Tyler C. Jordan; Brooks (South Carolina) Artillery (Rhett's Battery): Lt William Elliott; Eubank's (Virginia) Battery: Cpt John L. Eubank; Madison (Louisiana) Light Artillery: Cpt George V. Moody; Parker's (Virginia) Battery: Cpt William W. Parker

=== Left Wing ===
MG Thomas J. Jackson

Chief of Artillery: Col Stapleton Crutchfield

Escort:

- 4th Virginia Cavalry, Company H: Cpt Robert Randolph
- White's Virginia Cavalry (3 companies): Cpt Elijah V. White

Division	Brigade	Regiments and Others
Ewell's Division; BG Alexander Lawton (w); BG Jubal A. Early	Lawton's Brigade Col Marcellus Douglass (k); Maj John H. Lowe; Col John H. Lamar	13th Georgia: Cpt D. A. Kidd; 26th Georgia; 31st Georgia: Ltc John T. Crowder (w), Maj John H. Lowe; 38th Georgia: Cpt William H. Battey (k), Cpt Peter Brennan; 60th Georgia: Maj Waters B. Jones; 61st Georgia: Col John H. Lamar, Maj Archibald P. McRae (k)
Ewell's Division; BG Alexander Lawton (w); BG Jubal A. Early	Early's Brigade BG Jubal A. Early; Col William Smith (w)	13th Virginia: Cpt Frank V. Winston; 25th Virginia: Cpt Robert D. Lilley; 31st Virginia; 44th Virginia: Cpt David W. Anderson (w); 49th Virginia: Col William Smith, Ltc Jonathan C. Gibson (w); 52nd Virginia: Col Michael G. Harman; 58th Virginia
Ewell's Division; BG Alexander Lawton (w); BG Jubal A. Early	Trimble's Brigade Col James A. Walker (w)	15th Alabama: Cpt Isaac B. Feagin; 12th Georgia: Cpt James G. Rogers (k), Cpt John T. Carson; 21st Georgia: Maj Thomas C. Glover (w), Cpt James C. Nisbit; 21st North Carolina: Cpt F. P. Miller (k); 1st North Carolina Battalion Sharpshooters
Ewell's Division; BG Alexander Lawton (w); BG Jubal A. Early	Hays' Brigade BG Harry T. Hays	5th Louisiana: Col Henry Forno; 6th Louisiana: Col Henry B. Strong (k); 7th Louisiana: Col. Davidson Bradfute Penn; 8th Louisiana: Ltc Trevanion D. Lewis (w); 14th Louisiana
Ewell's Division; BG Alexander Lawton (w); BG Jubal A. Early	Artillery Maj Alfred R. Courtney	Johnson's (Virginia) Battery: Cpt John R. Johnson; Louisiana Guard Battery: Cpt Louis E. D'Aquin
A. P. Hill's Light Division; MG Ambrose P. Hill	Branch's Brigade BG Lawrence O. Branch (k); Col James H. Lane	7th North Carolina: Col Edward G. Haywood; 18th North Carolina: Ltc Thomas J. Purdie; 28th North Carolina: Col James H. Lane, Maj William J. Montgomery; 33rd North Carolina: Ltc Robert F. Hoke; 37th North Carolina: Cpt William G. Morris
A. P. Hill's Light Division; MG Ambrose P. Hill	Gregg's Brigade BG Maxcy Gregg (w)	1st South Carolina (Provisional Army): Col Daniel H. Hamilton, Sr.; 1st South Carolina Rifles: Ltc James M. Perrin (w); 12th South Carolina: Col Dixon Barnes (mw), Maj William H. McCorkle; 13th South Carolina: Col Oliver E. Edwards; 14th South Carolina: Ltc William D. Simpson
A. P. Hill's Light Division; MG Ambrose P. Hill	Field's Brigade Col John M. Brockenbrough	40th Virginia: Ltc Fleet W. Cox; 47th Virginia: Ltc John W. Lyell; 55th Virginia: Maj Charles N. Lawson; 22nd Virginia Battalion: Maj Edward P. Tayloe
A. P. Hill's Light Division; MG Ambrose P. Hill	Archer's Brigade BG James J. Archer; Col Peter Turney	5th Alabama Battalion: Cpt Charles M. Hooper; 19th Georgia: Maj James H. Neal; 1st Tennessee (Provisional Army): Col Peter Turney; 7th Tennessee: Lt George A. Howard; 14th Tennessee: Col William McComb (w), Ltc James W. Lockert
A. P. Hill's Light Division; MG Ambrose P. Hill	Pender's Brigade BG William D. Pender	16th North Carolina: Ltc William A. Stowe; 22nd North Carolina: Maj Christopher C. Cole; 34th North Carolina: Ltc John McDowell; 38th North Carolina
A. P. Hill's Light Division; MG Ambrose P. Hill	Artillery Ltc R. Lindsay Walker	Pee Dee (South Carolina) Artillery: Cpt David G. McIntosh; Crenshaw's (Virginia) Battery: Cpt William G. Crenshaw; Fredericksburg (Virginia) Artillery: Cpt Carter M. Braxton; Purcell (Virginia) Artillery: Cpt William R. J. Pegram
Jackson's Division; BG John R. Jones (w); BG William E. Starke (k); Col Andrew J. Grigsby	Winder's Brigade Col Andrew J. Grigsby; Ltc Robert D. Gardner (w); Maj Hazael J. Williams	4th Virginia: Ltc Robert D. Gardner; 5th Virginia: Maj Hazael J. Williams, Cpt E. L. Curtis (w); 27th Virginia: Cpt Frank C. Wilson; 33rd Virginia: Cpt Jacob Golladay (w), Lt David Walton
Jackson's Division; BG John R. Jones (w); BG William E. Starke (k); Col Andrew J. Grigsby	Taliaferro's Brigade Col Edward T. H. Warren; Col James W. Jackson (w); Col James L. Sheffield	47th Alabama: Col James W. Jackson, Maj James M. Campbell; 48th Alabama: Col James L. Sheffield; 23rd Virginia Ltc Simeon T. Walton (w); 37th Virginia: Ltc John F. Terry (w)
Jackson's Division; BG John R. Jones (w); BG William E. Starke (k); Col Andrew J. Grigsby	Jones' Brigade Cpt John E. Penn (w); Cpt A. C. Page (w); Cpt Robert W. Withers	21st Virginia: Cpt A. C. Page; 42nd Virginia: Cpt Robert W. Withers, Cpt D. W. Garrett; 48th Virginia: Cpt John H. Candler; 1st Virginia Battalion: Lt Charles A. Davidson
Jackson's Division; BG John R. Jones (w); BG William E. Starke (k); Col Andrew J. Grigsby	Starke's Brigade BG William E. Starke; Col Jesse M. Williams (w); Col Leroy A. Stafford (w); Col Edmund Pendleton	1st Louisiana: Ltc Michael Nolan (w), Cpt William E. Moore; 2nd Louisiana: Col Jesse M. Williams; 9th Louisiana: Col Leroy A. Stafford, Ltc William R. Peck; 10th Louisiana: Cpt Henry D. Monier; 15th Louisiana: Col Edmund Pendleton; Coppens' (First Louisiana Zouaves) Battalion: Cpt M. Alfred Coppens
Jackson's Division; BG John R. Jones (w); BG William E. Starke (k); Col Andrew J. Grigsby	Artillery Maj Lindsay M. Shumaker	Alleghany (Virginia) Artillery: Cpt John C. Carpenter; Baltimore (Maryland) Artillery: Cpt John B. Brockenbrough; Danville (Virginia) Artillery: Cpt George Wooding; Hampden (Virginia) Artillery: Cpt William H. Caskie; Lee (Virginia) Battery: Cpt Charles I. Raine; Rockbridge (Virginia) Artillery: Cpt William T. Poague
D. H. Hill's Division; MG Daniel H. Hill	Ripley's Brigade BG Roswell S. Ripley (w); Col George P. Doles	4th Georgia: Col George P. Doles, Maj Robert S. Smith (k), Cpt William H. Willis; 44th Georgia: Cpt John C. Key; 1st North Carolina: Ltc Hamilton A. Brown; 3rd North Carolina: Col William L. De Rosset (w), Maj Stephen D. Thruston (w)
D. H. Hill's Division; MG Daniel H. Hill	Rodes' Brigade BG Robert E. Rodes (w)	3rd Alabama: Col Cullen A. Battle; 5th Alabama: Maj Edwin L. Hobson; 6th Alabama: Col John B. Gordon (w), Ltc James N. Lightfoot (w); 12th Alabama: Cpt E. Tucker (k), Cpt W. L. Maroney (w), Cpt Adolph Proskauer (w); 26th Alabama: Col Edward A. O'Neal (w)
D. H. Hill's Division; MG Daniel H. Hill	Garland's Brigade Col Duncan K. McRae (w)	5th North Carolina: Cpt Thomas M. Garrett; 12th North Carolina: Cpt Shugan Snow; 13th North Carolina: Ltc Thomas Ruffin, Jr. (w), Cpt Joseph H. Hyman; 20th North Carolina: Col Alfred Iverson, Jr.; 23rd North Carolina: Col Daniel H. Christie
D. H. Hill's Division; MG Daniel H. Hill	Anderson's Brigade BG George B. Anderson (mw); Col Risden T. Bennett (w)	2nd North Carolina: Col Charles C. Tew (k), Cpt Gideon M. Roberts; 4th North Carolina: Col Bryan Grimes, Cpt William T. Marsh (k), Cpt Daniel P. Latham (k); 14th North Carolina: Col Risden T. Bennett; 30th North Carolina: Col Francis M. Parker (w), Maj William W. Sillers
D. H. Hill's Division; MG Daniel H. Hill	Rains' (old) Brigade Col Alfred H. Colquitt	13th Alabama: Col Birkett D. Fry (w), Ltc William H. Betts (w); 6th Georgia: Ltc James M. Newton (k), Maj Philemon Tracy (mw), Lt Eugene P. Bennett; 23rd Georgia: Col William P. Barclay (k), Ltc Emory F. Best (w), Maj James H. Huggins (w); 27th Georgia: Col Levi B. Smith (k), Ltc Charles T. Zachry (w), Cpt William H. Rentfro; 28th Georgia: Maj Tully Graybill (w), Cpt Nehemiah J. Garrison (w), Cpt George W. Warthen
D. H. Hill's Division; MG Daniel H. Hill	Artillery Maj Scipio Pierson	Hardaway's (Alabama) Battery: Cpt Robert A. Hardaway; Jefferson Davis (Alabama) Artillery: Cpt James W. Bondurant; Jones' (Virginia) Battery: Cpt William B. Jones; King William (Virginia) Artillery: Cpt Thomas H. Carter (w)

=== Artillery Reserve ===
Division	Battalions	Batteries
Artillery Reserve; BG William N. Pendleton	Brown's Battalion Col J. Thompson Brown	Powhatan (Virginia) Artillery: Cpt Willis J. Dance; Richmond (Virginia) Howitzers, 2nd company: Cpt David Watson; Richmond (Virginia) Howitzers, 3rd company: Cpt Benjamin H. Smith, Jr.; Salem (Virginia) Artillery: Cpt Abraham Hupp; Williamsburg (Virginia) Artillery: Cpt John A. Coke
Artillery Reserve; BG William N. Pendleton	Cutts' Battalion Ltc Allen S. Cutts	Blackshears' (Georgia) Battery: Cpt James A. Blackshear; Irwin (Georgia) Artillery: Cpt John Lane; Lloyd's (North Carolina) Battery: Cpt Whitmel P. Lloyd; Patterson's (Georgia) Battery: Cpt George M. Patterson; Ross' (Georgia) Battery: Cpt Hugh M. Ross
Artillery Reserve; BG William N. Pendleton	Jones' Battalion Maj Hilary P. Jones	Morris (Virginia) Artillery: Cpt Richard C. M. Page; Orange (Virginia) Artillery: Cpt Jefferson Peyton; Turner's (Virginia) Battery: Cpt William H. Turner; Long Island (Virginia) Battery: Cpt Abram Wimbish
Artillery Reserve; BG William N. Pendleton	Nelson's Battalion Maj William Nelson	Amherst (Virginia) Artillery: Cpt Thomas J. Kirkpatrick; Fluvanna (Virginia) Artillery: Cpt John J. Ancell; Huckstep's (Virginia) Battery: Cpt Charles T. Huckstep; Johnson's (Virginia) Battery: Cpt. Marmaduke Johnson; Milledge (Georgia) Artillery: Cpt John Milledge
Artillery Reserve; BG William N. Pendleton	Miscellaneous Batteries	Cutshaw's (Virginia) Battery; Magruder (Virginia) Artillery; Rice's (Virginia) Battery: Cpt William H. Rice

=== Cavalry ===
Division	Brigade	Regiments and Others
Stuart's Division; MG James E.B. Stuart	Hampton's Brigade BG Wade Hampton	1st North Carolina: Col Laurence S. Baker; 2nd South Carolina: Col Matthew C. Butler; 10th Virginia; Cobb's (Georgia) Legion: Ltc Pierce M. B. Young (w), Maj William G. Delony; Jeff Davis (Mississippi) Legion: Ltc William T. Martin
Stuart's Division; MG James E.B. Stuart	Lee's Brigade BG Fitzhugh Lee	1st Virginia: Ltc Luke T. Brien; 3rd Virginia: Ltc John T. Thornton (mw), Cpt Thomas Owens; 4th Virginia: Col Williams C. Wickham; 5th Virginia: Col Thomas L. Rosser; 9th Virginia
Stuart's Division; MG James E.B. Stuart	Robertson's Brigade Col Thomas T. Munford	2nd Virginia: Ltc Richard H. Burks; 6th Virginia; 7th Virginia: Cpt Samuel B. Myers; 12th Virginia: Col Asher W. Harman; 17th Virginia Battalion
Stuart's Division; MG James E.B. Stuart	Horse Artillery Cpt John Pelham	Chew's (Virginia) Battery: Cpt R. Preston Chew; Hart's (South Carolina) Battery: Cpt James F. Hart; Pelham's (Virginia) Battery: Cpt John Pelham
