= Battle of Gettysburg order of battle: Confederate =

The Confederate order of battle during the Battle of Gettysburg includes the American Civil War officers and men of the Army of Northern Virginia (multiple commander names indicate command succession during the three-day battle (July 1–3, 1863)). Order of battle compiled from the army organization during the battle, the casualty returns and the reports.

== Abbreviations used ==
=== Military rank ===
- Gen = General
- LTG = Lieutenant General
- MG = Major General
- BG = Brigadier General
- Col = Colonel
- Ltc = Lieutenant Colonel
- Maj = Major
- Cpt = Captain
- Lt = Lieutenant

=== Other ===
- (w) = wounded
- (mw) = mortally wounded
- (k) = killed in action
- (c) = captured

== Army of Northern Virginia ==
General Robert E. Lee, Commanding

General Staff:

- Chief of Staff and Inspector General: Col Robert H. Chilton
- Chief of Artillery: BG William N. Pendleton
- Medical Director: Dr. Lafayette Guild
- Chief of Ordnance: Ltc Briscoe G. Baldwin
- Chief of Commissary: Ltc Robert G. Cole
- Chief Quartermaster: Ltc James L. Corley
- Judge Advocate General: Maj Henry E. Young
- Military Secretary and Acting Asst. Chief of Artillery: Col Armistead L. Long
- Asst. Inspector General: Col Henry L. Peyton
- Asst. Inspector General and Asst. Adjutant General: Maj Henry E. Young
- Asst. Inspector General and Asst. Adjutant General: Maj Giles B. Cook
- Aide de Camp and Asst. Adjutant General: Maj Walter H. Taylor
- Aide de Camp and Asst. Military Secretary: Maj Charles Marshall
- Aide de Camp and Asst. Inspector General: Maj Charles S. Venable
- Aide de Camp: Maj Thomas M. R. Talcott
- Aide de Camp: Lt George W. Peterkin
- Engineer: Col William P. Smith
- Engineer: Cpt Samuel R. Johnston

General Headquarters:

- Escort: 39th Virginia Cavalry Battalion (companies A & C)

=== First Corps ===
LTG James Longstreet, Commanding

General Staff:

- Chief of Staff: Ltc Moxley Sorrel (w)
- Signal Officer: Cpt Jacob H. Manning
- Quartermaster: Maj Samuel P. Mitchell
- Commissary and subsistence: Maj Raphael J. Moses
- Asst. Adjutant General & Asst. Inspector General: Maj Osmun Latrobe
- Asst. Adjutant General & Assistant Inspector General: Maj John Walter Fairfax
- Ordnance Officer: Lt. Col. Peyton T. Manning
- Engineer: Maj John J. Clarke
- Aide de Camp: Cpt Thomas J. Goree
- Medical Director: Dr. John S. D. Cullen

Division	Brigade	Regiments and Others
McLaws' Division; MG Lafayette McLaws	Kershaw's Brigade: BG Joseph B. Kershaw	2nd South Carolina: Col John D. Kennedy (w), Ltc Franklin Gaillard, Maj William Wallace (w); 3rd South Carolina: Ltc David Langston (k), Maj Robert C. Maffett, Col James D. Nance; 7th South Carolina: Col David W. Aiken, Ltc Elbert Bland (w); 8th South Carolina: Col John W. Henagan, Maj D. M. McCleod (mw); 15th South Carolina: Col William D. de Saussure (mw), Maj William M. Gist; 3rd South Carolina Battalion: Ltc William G. Rice, Maj D. B. Miller (w)
McLaws' Division; MG Lafayette McLaws	Barksdale's Brigade BG William Barksdale (mw); Col Benjamin G. Humphreys	13th Mississippi: Col James W. Carter (k), Ltc Kennon McElroy (w), Maj John M. Bradley (mw); 17th Mississippi: Col William D. Holder (w), Ltc John C. Fiser (w), Acting Maj Andrew J. Pulliam (w), Acting Maj Richard E. Jones (k), Cpt Gwen R. Cherry; 18th Mississippi: Col Thomas M. Griffin (w), Ltc William H. Luse (c), Maj George B. Gerald; 21st Mississippi: Col Benjamin G. Humphreys
McLaws' Division; MG Lafayette McLaws	Semmes' Brigade BG Paul J. Semmes (mw); Col Goode Bryan	10th Georgia: Col John B. Weems (w); 50th Georgia: Col William R. Manning, Ltc Francis Kearse (k); 51st Georgia: Col Edward Ball, Maj Henry M. Dunwoody (k); 53rd Georgia: Col James P. Simms (w), Cpt I. M. D. Bond (k), Cpt Sheridan Brown (w)
McLaws' Division; MG Lafayette McLaws	Wofford's Brigade BG William T. Wofford	16th Georgia: Ltc Henry P. Thomas; 18th Georgia: Ltc Solon Z. Ruff; 24th Georgia: Col Robert McMillan; Cobb's (Georgia) Legion: Ltc Luther J. Glenn, Maj Thomas Camak (k); Phillips' (Georgia) Legion: Ltc Elihu S. Barclay; 3rd Georgia Sharpshooter Battalion: Ltc Nathan Hutchins
McLaws' Division; MG Lafayette McLaws	Cabell's Artillery Battalion Col Henry C. Cabell; Maj Samuel P. Hamilton	1st North Carolina Artillery, Battery A: Cpt Basil C. Manly; Pulaski (Georgia) Artillery: Cpt John C. Fraser (mw), Lt William J. Furlong; 1st Richmond Howitzers: Cpt Edward S. McCarthy (w), Lt Robert M. Anderson; Troup (Georgia) Artillery: Cpt Henry H. Carlton (w), Lt C. W. Motes
Pickett's Division; MG George E. Pickett	Garnett's Brigade BG Richard B. Garnett (k); Maj Charles S. Peyton (w)	8th Virginia: Col Eppa Hunton (w), Ltc Norborne Berkeley (w&c), Maj Edmund Berkeley (w); 18th Virginia: Ltc Henry A. Carrington (w&c); 19th Virginia: Col Henry Gantt (w), Ltc John T. Ellis (mw), Maj Charles S. Peyton; 28th Virginia: Col Robert C. Allen (k), Ltc William Watts, Maj Nathaniel C. Wilson (mw); 56th Virginia: Col William D. Stuart (mw), Ltc P. P. Slaughter
Pickett's Division; MG George E. Pickett	Kemper's Brigade BG James L. Kemper (w&c); Col Joseph Mayo, Jr	1st Virginia: Col Lewis B. Williams, Jr (mw), Ltc F. G. Skinner, Maj Francis H. Langley (w); 3rd Virginia: Col Joseph Mayo Jr, Ltc Alexander D. Callcote (k), Maj William H. Pryor; 7th Virginia: Col Waller T. Patton (mw&c), Ltc Charles C. Flowerree; 11th Virginia: Maj Kirkwood Otey (w), Cpt James R. Hutter (w&c), Cpt John Holmes Smith (w), Cpt Robert W. Douthat; 24th Virginia: Col William R. Terry (w), Maj Joseph A. Hambrick (w), Cpt William N. Bentley
Pickett's Division; MG George E. Pickett	Armistead's Brigade BG Lewis A. Armistead (mw&c); Ltc William White (w); Maj Joseph R. Cabell; Col William R. Aylett	9th Virginia: Maj John C. Owens (mw), Cpt James J. Phillips; 14th Virginia: Col James G. Hodges (k), Ltc William White (w), Maj Robert H. Poore (mw); 38th Virginia: Col Edward C. Edmonds (k), Ltc Powhatan B. Whittle (w&c), Maj Joseph R. Cabell; 53rd Virginia: Col William R. Aylett (w), Ltc Rawley W. Martin (w&c), Maj John C. Timberlake (c), Cpt Henry Edmunds; 57th Virginia: Col John B. Magruder (mw&c), Ltc Benjamin H. Wade (mw), Maj Clement R. Fontaine
Pickett's Division; MG George E. Pickett	Dearing's Artillery Battalion Maj James Dearing; Maj John P. W. Read (w)	Fauquier (Virginia) Artillery: Cpt Robert M. Stribling; Hampden (Virginia) Artillery: Cpt William H. Caskie; Richmond Fayette (Virginia) Artillery: Cpt Miles C. Macon; Blount's (Virginia) Battery: Cpt Joseph G. Blount
Hood's Division; MG John Bell Hood (w); BG Evander M. Law	Law's Brigade BG Evander M. Law; Col James L. Sheffield	4th Alabama: Ltc Laurence H. Scruggs; 15th Alabama: Col William C. Oates, Ltc Isaac B. Feagin (w&c); 44th Alabama: Col William F. Perry (w), Ltc John H. Jones, Maj George W. Cary; 47th Alabama: Ltc Michael J. Bulger (w&c), Maj James M. Campbell; 48th Alabama: Col James L. Sheffield, Ltc W. M. Hardwick (w), Maj C. B. St. John (w), Cpt T. J. Eubanks (w)
Hood's Division; MG John Bell Hood (w); BG Evander M. Law	Robertson's Brigade BG Jerome B. Robertson (w); Ltc Philip A. Work	3rd Arkansas: Col Van H. Manning (w), Ltc Robert S. Taylor, Maj John W. Reedy; 1st Texas: Ltc Philip A. Work, Maj Frederick S. Bass; 4th Texas: Col John C. G. Key (w), Ltc Benjamin F. Carter (mw), Maj John P. Bane; 5th Texas: Col Robert M. Powell (w&c), Ltc King Bryan (w), Maj Jefferson C. Rogers
Hood's Division; MG John Bell Hood (w); BG Evander M. Law	Anderson's Brigade BG George T. Anderson (w); Ltc William Luffman (w)	7th Georgia: Col William W. White; 8th Georgia: Col John R. Towers; 9th Georgia: Ltc John C. Mounger (k), Maj William M. Jones (w), Cpt George Hillyer; 11th Georgia: Col Francis H. Little (w), Ltc William Luffman, Maj Henry D. McDaniel; 59th Georgia: Col William A. Jackson Brown (w), Maj Bolivar H. Gee (w), Cpt M. G. Bass
Hood's Division; MG John Bell Hood (w); BG Evander M. Law	Benning's Brigade BG Henry L. Benning	2nd Georgia: Ltc William T. Harris (k), Maj William S. Shepherd; 15th Georgia: Col Dudley M. Du Bose, Ltc Stephen Z. Hearnsberger (c); 17th Georgia: Col Wesley C. Hodges; 20th Georgia: Col John A. Jones (k), Ltc James D. Waddell
Hood's Division; MG John Bell Hood (w); BG Evander M. Law	Henry's Artillery Battalion Maj Mathias W. Henry; Maj John C. Haskell	Branch (North Carolina) Battery: Cpt Alexander C. Latham; Charleston German (South Carolina) Artillery: Cpt William K. Bachman; Palmetto (South Carolina) Light Artillery: Cpt Hugh R. Garden; Rowan North Carolina Artillery: Cpt James Reilly
Artillery Reserve; Col James B. Walton	Alexander's Artillery Battalion Col Edward P. Alexander (w)	Ashland (Virginia) Artillery: Cpt Pichegru Woolfolk, Jr (w), Lt James Woolfolk; Bedford (Virginia) Artillery: Cpt Tyler C. Jordan; Brooks (South Carolina) Artillery: Cpt William W. Fickling; Madison Louisiana Light Artillery: Cpt George V. Moody; Richmond (Virginia) Battery: Cpt William W. Parker; Bath (Virginia) Battery: Cpt Osmond B. Taylor
Artillery Reserve; Col James B. Walton	Washington (Louisiana) Artillery Battalion; Maj Benjamin F. Eshleman	First Company: Cpt Charles W. Squires; Second Company: Cpt John B. Richardson; Third Company: Cpt Merritt B. Miller; Fourth Company: Cpt Joseph Norcom (w), Lt H. A. Battles

=== Second Corps ===
LTG Richard S. Ewell, Commanding

General Staff:

- Supernumerary: MG Isaac R. Trimble
- Chief of Staff: Ltc Charles J. Faulkner
- Asst. Adjutant General: Maj Alexander S. Pendleton
- Asst. Adjutant General: Maj George C. Brown
- Aide de Camp: Cpt James P. Smith
- Aide de Camp: Lt Thomas T. Turner
- Asst. Adjutant General & Asst. Inspector General: Col Abner Smead
- Asst. Inspector General: Maj Benjamin H. Green
- Asst. Quartermaster: Maj John A. Harman
- Commissaries and subsistence: Maj Wells J. Hawks
- Engineer: Cpt Henry B. Richardson (w&c)
- Topographical engineer: Cpt Jedediah Hotchkiss
- Ordnance: Maj William Allen
- Signal Officer: Cpt Richard E. Wilbourn
- Medical Director: Dr. Hunter H. McGuire
- Escort: Randolph's Company Virginia Cavalry, Cpt William F. Randolph
- Provost Guard: 1st North Carolina Battalion Sharpshooters

Division	Brigade	Regiments and Others
Early's Division; MG Jubal A. Early	Hays' Brigade BG Harry T. Hays	5th Louisiana: Maj Alexander Hart (w), Cpt T. H. Biscoe; 6th Louisiana: Ltc Joseph Hanlon; 7th Louisiana: Col Davidson Bradfute Penn; 8th Louisiana: Col Trevanian D. Lewis (k), Ltc Alcibiades DeBlanc (w), Maj German A. Lester; 9th Louisiana: Col Leroy A. Stafford
Early's Division; MG Jubal A. Early	Smith's Brigade BG William Smith	31st Virginia: Col John S. Hoffman; 49th Virginia: Ltc Jonathan C. Gibson; 52nd Virginia: Ltc James H. Skinner (w)
Early's Division; MG Jubal A. Early	Hoke's Brigade Col Isaac E. Avery (mw); Col Archibald C. Godwin	6th North Carolina: Maj Samuel McD. Tate; 21st North Carolina: Col William W. Kirkland, Maj James Beall; 57th North Carolina: Col Archibald C. Godwin, Ltc Hamilton C. Jones
Early's Division; MG Jubal A. Early	Gordon's Brigade BG John B. Gordon	13th Georgia: Col James M. Smith; 26th Georgia: Col Edmund N. Atkinson; 31st Georgia: Col Clement A. Evans (w); 38th Georgia: Ltc William L. McLeod (k), Lt. John Oglesby (k), Lt. W.F. Goodwin (k); 60th Georgia: Cpt Walters B. Jones; 61st Georgia: Col John H. Lamar, Maj Peter Brenan (k)
Early's Division; MG Jubal A. Early	Jones' Artillery Battalion Ltc Hilary P. Jones	Charlottesville (Virginia) Artillery: Cpt James McD. Carrington; Courtney (Virginia) Artillery: Cpt William A. Tanner; Louisiana Guard Battery: Cpt Charles A. Green; Staunton (Virginia) Artillery: Cpt Asher W. Garber
Early's Division; MG Jubal A. Early	Cavalry	35th Virginia Battalion: Ltc Elijah V. White
Johnson's Division; MG Edward Johnson	Steuart's Brigade BG George H. Steuart	1st Maryland Battalion: Ltc James R. Herbert (w), Maj William W. Goldsborough (w&c), Cpt James P. Crane; 1st North Carolina: Ltc Hamilton A. Brown; 3rd North Carolina: Maj William M. Parsley; 10th Virginia: Col Edward T. H. Warren; 23rd Virginia: Ltc Simeon T. Walton; 37th Virginia: Maj Henry C. Wood
Johnson's Division; MG Edward Johnson	Stonewall Brigade BG James A. Walker	2nd Virginia: Col John Q. A. Nadenbousch; 4th Virginia: Maj William Terry; 5th Virginia: Col John H. S. Funk, Ltc H. J. Williams (w); 27th Virginia: Ltc Daniel M. Shriver; 33rd Virginia: Cpt Jacob B. Golladay
Johnson's Division; MG Edward Johnson	Nicholls' Brigade Col Jesse M. Williams	1st Louisiana: Ltc Michael Nolan (k), Cpt Edward D. Willett; 2nd Louisiana: Ltc Ross E. Burke (w&c); 10th Louisiana: Maj Thomas N. Powell; 14th Louisiana: Ltc David Zable; 15th Louisiana: Maj Andrew Brady
Johnson's Division; MG Edward Johnson	Jones' Brigade BG John M. Jones (w); Ltc Robert H. Dungan	21st Virginia: Cpt William P. Moseley; 25th Virginia: Col John C. Higginbotham (w), Ltc J. A. Robinson, Maj Robert D. Lilley; 42nd Virginia: Ltc Robert W. Withers (w), Cpt Samuel H. Saunders; 44th Virginia: Maj Norvell P. Cobb (w), Cpt Thomas R. Buckner; 48th Virginia: Ltc Robert H. Dungan, Maj Oscar White; 50th Virginia: Ltc Logan H. N. Salyer, Maj L. J. Perkins
Johnson's Division; MG Edward Johnson	Andrews' Artillery Battalion Maj Joseph W. Latimer (mw); Cpt Charles I. Raine	1st Maryland Battery: Cpt William F. Dement; Alleghany (Virginia) Artillery: Cpt John C. Carpenter; Chesapeake (Maryland) Artillery: Cpt William D. Brown (mw), Lt Walter S. Chew; Lee (Virginia) Battery: Cpt Charles I. Raine, Lt William W. Hardwicke
Rodes' Division; MG Robert E. Rodes	Daniel's Brigade BG Junius Daniel	32nd North Carolina: Col Edmund C. Brabble, Ltc David G. Cowand, Maj Henry G. Lewis (w&c); 43rd North Carolina: Col Thomas S. Kenan (w&c), Ltc William G. Lewis; 45th North Carolina: Ltc Samuel H. Boyd (w&c), Maj John R. Winston (w&c), Cpt A. H. Gallaway (w), Cpt James A. Hopkins; 53rd North Carolina: Col William A. Owens, Ltc James T. Morehead, Jr. (w&c), Maj James J. Iredell; 2nd North Carolina Battalion: Ltc Hezekiah L. Andrews (k), Maj John M. Hancock (w&c), Cpt Van Brown
Rodes' Division; MG Robert E. Rodes	Doles' Brigade BG George P. Doles	4th Georgia: Ltc David R. E. Winn (k), Maj William H. Willis; 12th Georgia: Col Edward S. Willis, Maj Isaac Hardeman (w); 21st Georgia: Col John T. Mercer, Ltc Thomas W. Hooper, Maj Thomas C. Glover; 44th Georgia: Col Samuel P. Lumpkin (w&c), Maj William H. Peebles
Rodes' Division; MG Robert E. Rodes	Iverson's Brigade BG Alfred Iverson, Jr.	5th North Carolina: Cpt Speight B. West (w), Cpt Benjamin Robinson (w); 12th North Carolina: Ltc William Davis, Maj Robert W. Alston; 20th North Carolina: Ltc Nelson Slough (w), Maj John S. Brooks (w), Cpt Lewis T. Hicks; 23rd North Carolina: Col Daniel H. Christie (mw), Ltc Robert D. Johnston (w), Maj Charles C. Blacknall (w&c), Cpt Abner D. Peace (w), Cpt William H. Johnston (w), Cpt Vines E. Turner
Rodes' Division; MG Robert E. Rodes	Ramseur's Brigade BG Stephen D. Ramseur	2nd North Carolina: Maj Daniel W. Hurtt (w), Cpt James T. Scales; 4th North Carolina: Col Bryan Grimes, Ltc James M. Wood, Maj Edwin A. Osborne; 14th North Carolina: Col Risden T. Bennett (w), Maj Joseph H. Lambeth; 30th North Carolina: Col Francis M. Parker (w), Maj William W. Sellers
Rodes' Division; MG Robert E. Rodes	Rodes' (old) Brigade Col Edward A. O'Neal	3rd Alabama: Col Cullen A. Battle, Ltc Charles M. Forsyth, Maj Robert M. Sands; 5th Alabama: Col Josephus M. Hall, Maj Eugene Blackford; 6th Alabama: Col James N. Lightfoot (w), Maj Isaac F. Culver (w), Cpt Milledge L. Bowie; 12th Alabama: Col Samuel B. Pickens, Maj Adolph Proskauer; 26th Alabama: Ltc John C. Goodgame
Rodes' Division; MG Robert E. Rodes	Carter's Artillery Battalion Ltc Thomas H. Carter	Jefferson Davis (Alabama) Artillery: Cpt William J. Reese; King William (Virginia) Artillery: Cpt William P. P. Carter; Morris (Virginia) Artillery: Cpt Richard C. M. Page (w), Lt Samuel H. Pendleton; Orange (Virginia) Artillery: Cpt Charles W. Fry
Artillery Reserve; Col J. Thompson Brown	First Virginia Artillery Battalion Cpt Willis J. Dance	2nd Richmond (Virginia) Howitzers: Cpt David Watson; 3rd Richmond (Virginia) Howitzers: Cpt Benjamin H. Smith, Jr.; Powhatan (Virginia) Artillery: Lt John M. Cunningham; Rockbridge (Virginia) Artillery: Cpt Archibald Graham; Salem (Virginia) Artillery: Lt Charles B. Griffin
Artillery Reserve; Col J. Thompson Brown	Nelson's Artillery Battalion; Ltc William Nelson	Amherst (Virginia) Artillery: Cpt Thomas J. Kirkpatrick; Fluvanna (Virginia) Artillery: Cpt John L. Massie; Milledge's Georgia Battery: Cpt John Milledge, Jr.

=== Third Corps ===
LTG Ambrose P. Hill, Commanding

General Staff:

- Chief of Staff: Maj William H. Palmer
- Assistant Adjutant General: Cpt William N. Stark
- Signal Officer: Cpt Richard H. T. Adams
- Aide-de-camp: Cpt Murray Forbes Taylor

Division	Brigade	Regiments and Others
Anderson's Division; MG Richard H. Anderson	Wilcox's Brigade BG Cadmus M. Wilcox	8th Alabama: Ltc Hilary A. Herbert; 9th Alabama: Cpt Joseph H. King (w); 10th Alabama: Col William H. Forney (w&c), Ltc James E. Shelley; 11th Alabama: Col John C. C. Sanders (w), Ltc George E. Tayloe, Maj Richard J. Fletcher (w); 14th Alabama: Col Lucius Pinckard (w&c), Ltc James A. Broome
Anderson's Division; MG Richard H. Anderson	Mahone's Brigade BG William Mahone	6th Virginia: Col George T. Rogers; 12th Virginia: Col David A. Weisiger; 16th Virginia: Col Joseph H. Ham, Maj John T. Woodhouse (w); 41st Virginia: Col William A. Parham; 61st Virginia: Col Virginius D. Groner
Anderson's Division; MG Richard H. Anderson	Wright's Brigade BG Ambrose R. Wright; Col William Gibson; BG Ambrose R. Wright	3rd Georgia: Col Edward J. Walker; 22nd Georgia: Col Joseph Wasden (k), Capt Benjamin C. McCurry; 48th Georgia: Col William Gibson (w&c), Capt Matthew R. Hall; 2nd Georgia Battalion: Maj George W. Ross (mw&c), Cpt Charles J. Moffett
Anderson's Division; MG Richard H. Anderson	Perry's Brigade Col David Lang	2nd Florida: Maj Walter R. Moore (w&c); 5th Florida: Cpt Richmond N. Gardner (w); 8th Florida: Ltc William Baya
Anderson's Division; MG Richard H. Anderson	Posey's Brigade BG Carnot Posey (w); Col Nathaniel H. Harris	12th Mississippi: Col William H. Taylor; 16th Mississippi: Col Samuel E. Baker (w); 19th Mississippi: Maj Thomas J. Hardin; 48th Mississippi: Col Joseph M. Jayne
Anderson's Division; MG Richard H. Anderson	Cutts’ Artillery Battalion Maj John Lane	Company A: Cpt Hugh M. Ross; Company B: Cpt George M. Patterson; Company C: Cpt John T. Wingfield (w)
Heth's Division; MG Henry Heth (w); BG James J. Pettigrew (w)	Pettigrew's Brigade BG James J. Pettigrew; Col James K. Marshall (k); Maj John T. Jones (w)	11th North Carolina: Col Collett Leventhorpe (w&c), Maj Egbert A. Ross (k), Cpt Francis W. Bird; 26th North Carolina: Col Henry K. Burgwyn, Jr (k), Ltc John R. Lane (w), Maj John T. Jones, Cpt H. C. Albright; 47th North Carolina: Col George H. Faribault (w), Ltc John A. Graves (c), Ltc J. Owens Rogers; 52nd North Carolina: Col James K. Marshall, Ltc Marcus A. Parks (w&c), Maj John Q. Richardson (mw&c)
Heth's Division; MG Henry Heth (w); BG James J. Pettigrew (w)	Heth's (old) Brigade Col John M. Brockenbrough; Col Robert M. Mayo	40th Virginia: Cpt Thomas E. Betts, Cpt R. B. Davis; 47th Virginia: Col Robert M. Mayo, Ltc John W. Lyell; 55th Virginia: Col William S. Christian, Maj Charles N. Lawson; 22nd Virginia Battalion: Maj John S. Bowles
Heth's Division; MG Henry Heth (w); BG James J. Pettigrew (w)	Archer's Brigade BG James J. Archer (w&c); Col Birkett D. Fry (w&c); Ltc Samuel G. Shepard	13th Alabama: Col Birkett D. Fry; 5th Alabama Battalion: Maj Abram S. Van de Graaff; 1st Tennessee (Provisional Army): Ltc Newton J. George (c), Maj Felix G. Buchanan (w), Cpt J. B. Turney; 7th Tennessee: Col John A. Fite (c), Ltc Samuel G. Shepard; 14th Tennessee: Cpt Bruce L. Phillips
Heth's Division; MG Henry Heth (w); BG James J. Pettigrew (w)	Davis' Brigade BG Joseph R. Davis (w); Col Hugh R. Miller (mw&c)	2nd Mississippi: Col John M. Stone (w), Maj John A. Blair (c), Ltc David W. Humphries (k); 11th Mississippi: Acting Col Francis M. Green (w), Maj Reuben O. Reynolds (w); 42nd Mississippi: Col Hugh R. Miller, Cpt Andrew M. Nelson; 55th North Carolina: Col John K. Connally (w), Ltc Maurice T. Smith (mw), Maj Alfred H. Belo (w), Cpt George A. Gilreath (k), Cpt E. Fletcher Satterfield
Heth's Division; MG Henry Heth (w); BG James J. Pettigrew (w)	Garnett's Artillery Battalion Ltc John J. Garnett	Donaldsonville Louisiana Artillery: Cpt Victor Maurin; Huger (Virginia) Artillery: Cpt Joseph D. Moore; Lewis (Virginia) Artillery: Cpt John W. Lewis; Norfolk (Virginia) Blues Artillery: Cpt Charles R. Grandy
Pender's Division; MG William D. Pender (mw); BG James H. Lane; MG Isaac R. Trimble (w&c); BG James H. Lane	McGowan's Brigade Col Abner M. Perrin	1st South Carolina (Provisional Army): Maj Charles W. McCreary; 1st South Carolina Rifles: Cpt William M. Hadden; 12th South Carolina: Col John L. Miller, Maj E. F. Bookter; 13th South Carolina: Ltc Benjamin T. Brockman, Maj Isaac F. Hunt; 14th South Carolina: Ltc Joseph N. Brown (w), Maj Edward Croft (w), Cpt James Boatwright
Pender's Division; MG William D. Pender (mw); BG James H. Lane; MG Isaac R. Trimble (w&c); BG James H. Lane	Lane's Brigade BG James H. Lane; Col Clark M. Avery	7th North Carolina: Cpt J. McLeod Turner (w&c), Cpt James G. Harris; 18th North Carolina: Col John D. Barry; 28th North Carolina: Col Samuel D. Lowe (w), Ltc W. H. A. Speer; 33rd North Carolina: Col Clark M. Avery, Maj Joseph H. Saunders (w&c); 37th North Carolina: Col William M. Barbour, Ltc William G. Morris, Maj O. N. Brown
Pender's Division; MG William D. Pender (mw); BG James H. Lane; MG Isaac R. Trimble (w&c); BG James H. Lane	Thomas' Brigade BG Edward L. Thomas	14th Georgia: Col Robert W. Fulsom; 35th Georgia: Col Bolling H. Holt, Ltc William H. McCulloch; 45th Georgia: Col Thomas J. Simmons, Ltc Washington L. Grice; 49th Georgia: Col Samuel T. Player
Pender's Division; MG William D. Pender (mw); BG James H. Lane; MG Isaac R. Trimble (w&c); BG James H. Lane	Scales' Brigade BG Alfred M. Scales (w); Ltc George T. Gordon; Col William L. J. Lowrance	13th North Carolina: Col Joseph H. Hyman (w), Ltc Henry A. Rogers, Maj Elijah B. Withers; 16th North Carolina: Cpt Leroy W. Stowe; 22nd North Carolina: Col James Conner; 34th North Carolina: Col William Lee J. Lowrance (w), Ltc George T. Gordon (w); 38th North Carolina: Col William J. Hoke (w), Ltc John Ashford (w)
Pender's Division; MG William D. Pender (mw); BG James H. Lane; MG Isaac R. Trimble (w&c); BG James H. Lane	Poague's Artillery Battalion Maj William T. Poague	Albemarle (Virginia) Artillery: Cpt James W. Wyatt; Charlotte (North Carolina) Artillery:Cpt Joseph Graham; Madison (Mississippi) Artillery: Cpt George Ward; Brooke's Virginia Battery: Cpt James V. Brooke
Artillery Reserve; Col Reuben L. Walker	McIntosh's Artillery Battalion Maj David G. McIntosh	Danville (Virginia) Artillery: Cpt Robert S. Rice; Hardaway (Alabama) Artillery: Cpt William B. Hurt; 2nd Rockbridge (Virginia) Artillery: Lt Samuel Wallace; Johnson's Virginia Battery: Cpt Marmaduke Johnson
Artillery Reserve; Col Reuben L. Walker	Pegram's Artillery Battalion Maj William R. J. Pegram; Cpt Ervin B. Brunson	Crenshaw (Virginia) Battery: Cpt William G. Crenshaw; Fredericksburg (Virginia) Artillery: Cpt Edward A. Marye; Letcher (Virginia) Artillery: Cpt Thomas A. Brander; Pee Dee (South Carolina) Artillery: Lt William E. Zimmerman; Purcell (Virginia) Artillery: Cpt Joseph McGraw

=== Cavalry units ===
Division	Brigade	Regiments and Others
Stuart's Division; MG J. E. B. Stuart	Hampton's Brigade BG Wade Hampton (w); Col Laurence S. Baker	1st North Carolina: Col Laurence S. Baker (w), Ltc James B. Gordon; 1st South Carolina: Col John L. Black; 2nd South Carolina: Maj T. J. Lipscomb; Cobb's (Georgia) Legion: Col Pierce M. B. Young, Ltc W. G. Delony (w); Jeff. Davis (Mississippi) Legion: Col Joseph F. Waring, Maj William G. Conner (k); Phillips (Georgia) Legion: Ltc Jefferson C. Phillips
Stuart's Division; MG J. E. B. Stuart	Robertson's Brigade BG Beverly H. Robertson	4th North Carolina: Col Dennis D. Ferebee; 5th North Carolina
Stuart's Division; MG J. E. B. Stuart	Fitzhugh Lee's Brigade BG Fitzhugh Lee	1st Maryland Battalion: Maj Harry Gilmor, Maj Ridgely Brown; 1st Virginia: Maj William A. Morgan; 2nd Virginia: Col Thomas T. Munford, Maj Cary Breckinridge; 3rd Virginia: Col Thomas H. Owen; 4th Virginia: Col Williams C. Wickham; 5th Virginia: Col Thomas L. Rosser
Stuart's Division; MG J. E. B. Stuart	Jenkins' Brigade BG Albert G. Jenkins (w); Ltc Vincent A. Witcher	14th Virginia: Maj Benjamin F. Eakle; 16th Virginia: Col Milton J. Ferguson; 17th Virginia: Col William H. French; 34th Virginia Battalion: Ltc Vincent A. Witcher; 36th Virginia Battalion: Cpt Cornelius T. Smith; Jackson's (Virginia) Battery: Cpt Thomas E. Jackson
Stuart's Division; MG J. E. B. Stuart	William H. F. Lee's Brigade Col John R. Chambliss, Jr.	2nd North Carolina Cavalry: Captain William A. Graham; 9th Virginia: Col Richard L. T. Beale; 10th Virginia: Col James L. Davis (w&c); 13th Virginia: Capt. Benjamin F. Winfield
Stuart's Division; MG J. E. B. Stuart	Jones' Brigade BG William E. Jones	6th Virginia: Maj Cabel E. Flournoy; 7th Virginia: Ltc Thomas Marshall; 11th Virginia: Col Lunsford L. Lomax
Stuart's Division; MG J. E. B. Stuart	Stuart's Horse Artillery Maj Robert F. Beckham	Breathed's (Virginia) Battery: Cpt James Breathed; Chew's (Virginia) Battery: Cpt Roger P. Chew; Griffin's (Maryland) Battery: Cpt William H. Griffin; Hart's (South Carolina) Battery: Cpt James F. Hart; McGregor's (Virginia) Battery: Cpt William M. McGregor; Moorman's (Virginia) Battery: Cpt Marcellus N. Moorman
	Imboden's Command BG John D. Imboden	18th Virginia: Col George W. Imboden; 62nd Virginia: Col George H. Smith; McNeill's Company (Virginia) Partisan Rangers: Cpt John H. McNeill; Staunton (Virginia) Battery: Cpt John H. McClanahan
