= Battle of Gettysburg order of battle =

The order of battle for the Battle of Gettysburg includes:

- Battle of Gettysburg order of battle: Confederate
- Battle of Gettysburg order of battle: Union
