= Battle of Antietam order of battle =

The order of battle for the Battle of Antietam (known also as the Battle of Sharpsburg) includes:

- Battle of Antietam order of battle: Confederate
- Battle of Antietam order of battle: Union
