= Battle of Gloucester =

The Battle of Gloucester may refer to:

- Siege of Gloucester, a siege in England in 1643 during the First English Civil War
- Battle of Gloucester (1775), a land-sea engagement in the harbor of Gloucester, Massachusetts during the American Revolutionary War
- Battle of Gloucester (1777), a minor engagement in Gloucester, New Jersey during the American Revolutionary War
- Siege of Yorktown, which included a minor engagement near Gloucester Point, Virginia late in the American Revolutionary War
- Battle of Gloucester Point (1861), a minor engagement between a Union gunboat and a Virginia (Confederate) shore battery at the beginning of the American Civil War
- Battle of Cape Gloucester, fought in and around Cape Gloucester on the New Guinean island of New Britain in the Pacific theater of the Second World War
