= Henry Forno =

American military officer (1798–1866)

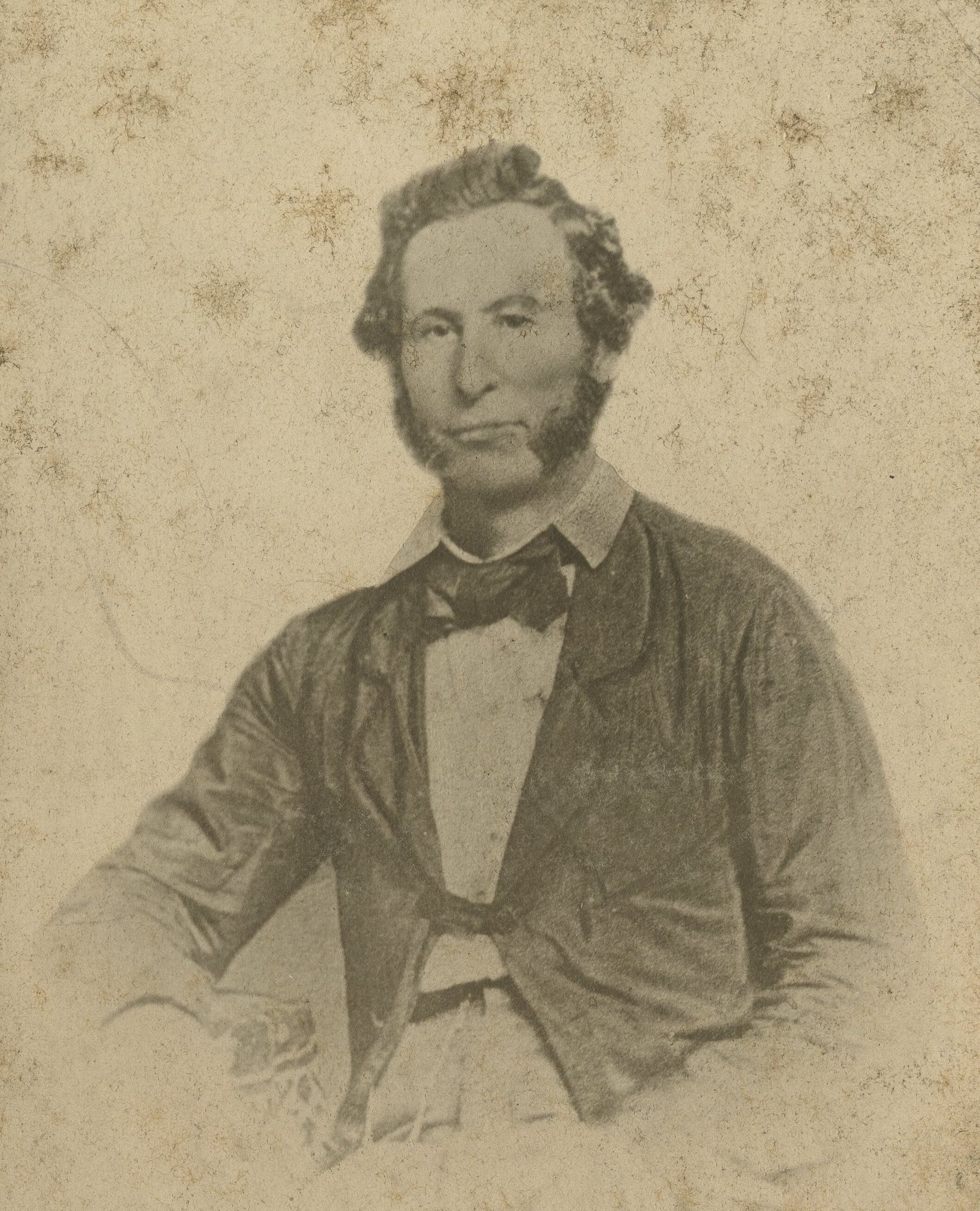
- Born: April 23, 1798; Charleston, South Carolina, U.S.
- Died: January 31, 1866 (aged 67); Amite City, Louisiana, U.S.
- Military career
- Allegiance: Louisiana; United States; Confederate States
- Branch: Louisiana Militia; United States Army; Confederate States Army
- Service years: 1846–1847 (USA); 1861–1865 (CSA)
- Rank: Lieutenant colonel (USA); Colonel (CSA)
- Unit: 1st Louisiana Volunteers
- Commands: 5th Louisiana Infantry Regiment; Thomasville Prison Camp
- Conflicts: Mexican-American War; American Civil War; Northern Virginia Campaign; Second Battle of Bull Run (WIA)

Henry Forno (April 23, 1798 – January 31, 1866) was an American military officer during the Mexican-American War and later a Confederate army officer during the American Civil War. After being wounded in action, he was transferred to command of a Confederate prison camp.

== Army service ==
=== United States Army ===
Forno, who was in the Louisiana militia, served as a United States Volunteers officer from 1846 to 1847 during the Mexican-American War. He was lieutenant colonel of the 1st Louisiana Regiment of Volunteers.

=== Confederate States Army ===
During the American Civil War, Forno served as Colonel of the 5th Louisiana Infantry Regiment during the latter phase of the Northern Virginia Campaign. He fought at the Second Battle of Bull Run during which he was wounded after assuming temporary command of a brigade.

After Bull Run, Forno was posted in Georgia where by late November 1864, he was placed in charge of moving prisoners of war from Savannah to Blackshear. He also served as part of the staff at the infamous Andersonville Prison before Sherman's March to the Sea caused Confederate authorities to relocate Union captives for fear of possible attempts to liberate prisons along the way. Forno was placed in charge of the Thomasville Prison Camp as part of the prisoner relocation process.

During its two and a half week period of operation, the camp's prisoner population was ravaged by smallpox. It was believed victims of the disease were buried in mass graves in the ditch surrounding the prison. The surviving prisoners were returned to Andersonville and the camp itself was burned in the aftermath.

== Post war ==
Forno was killed at age 67 in a locomotive explosion in Amite City, Louisiana.
