= Battle of Meadow Bridge =

Battle of the American Civil War

Coordinates: 37.6125°N 77.4073°W

- Part of the American Civil War
Date	May 12, 1864
Location	Henrico County, Virginia
Result	Union victory

Belligerents
United States (Union)	(Confederate States of America) CSA (Confederacy)

Commanders and leaders
(United States) Philip Sheridan	(Confederate States of America) Fitzhugh Lee (Confederate States of America) James B. Gordon †

Casualties and losses
170	Not reported

The Battle of Meadow Bridge (also known as Meadow Bridges and the Battle of Richmond Heights) was an engagement on May 12, 1864, in Henrico County, Virginia, during Lt. Gen. Ulysses S. Grant's Overland Campaign of the American Civil War. Following their victory at the Battle of Yellow Tavern on May 11, Union cavalry under Maj. Gen. Philip H. Sheridan advanced in the direction of the Confederate capital of Richmond. Caught in the narrow area between the fortifications of Richmond and the rain-swollen Chickahominy River, the Union troopers were subjected to fire from the artillery of Confederate Maj. Gen. Fitzhugh Lee. Michigan cavalry under Brig. Gen. George A. Custer forced a crossing of a damaged railroad bridge, which was quickly rebuilt by engineers, allowing the troopers to escape to safety and continue their raid.

== Background ==
On May 11, 1864, Sheridan and his Union cavalry force, on the second day of a daring raid against Richmond, defeated Maj. Gen. J.E.B. Stuart at the Battle of Yellow Tavern, mortally wounding the storied Confederate cavalier. Sheridan led his troops southward towards Richmond, carefully feeling his way through the abandoned outer defensive works. As darkness fell, a severe thunderstorm drenched the column, but Sheridan kept up his movement down the Brook Pike, not realizing that he was boxing himself into a potential trap. Confederates had left torpedoes (land mines) in the road—many exploded during the passage, killing several horses but not delaying the column further. As dawn broke and the storm subsided, Sheridan found himself only two and half miles from his objective. However, to his dismay, the intermediate defenses in his front swarmed with enemy troops. His left flank was against the swollen Chickahominy, and Confederate cavalry threatened his rear, hoping to capture the Union force.

== Battle ==
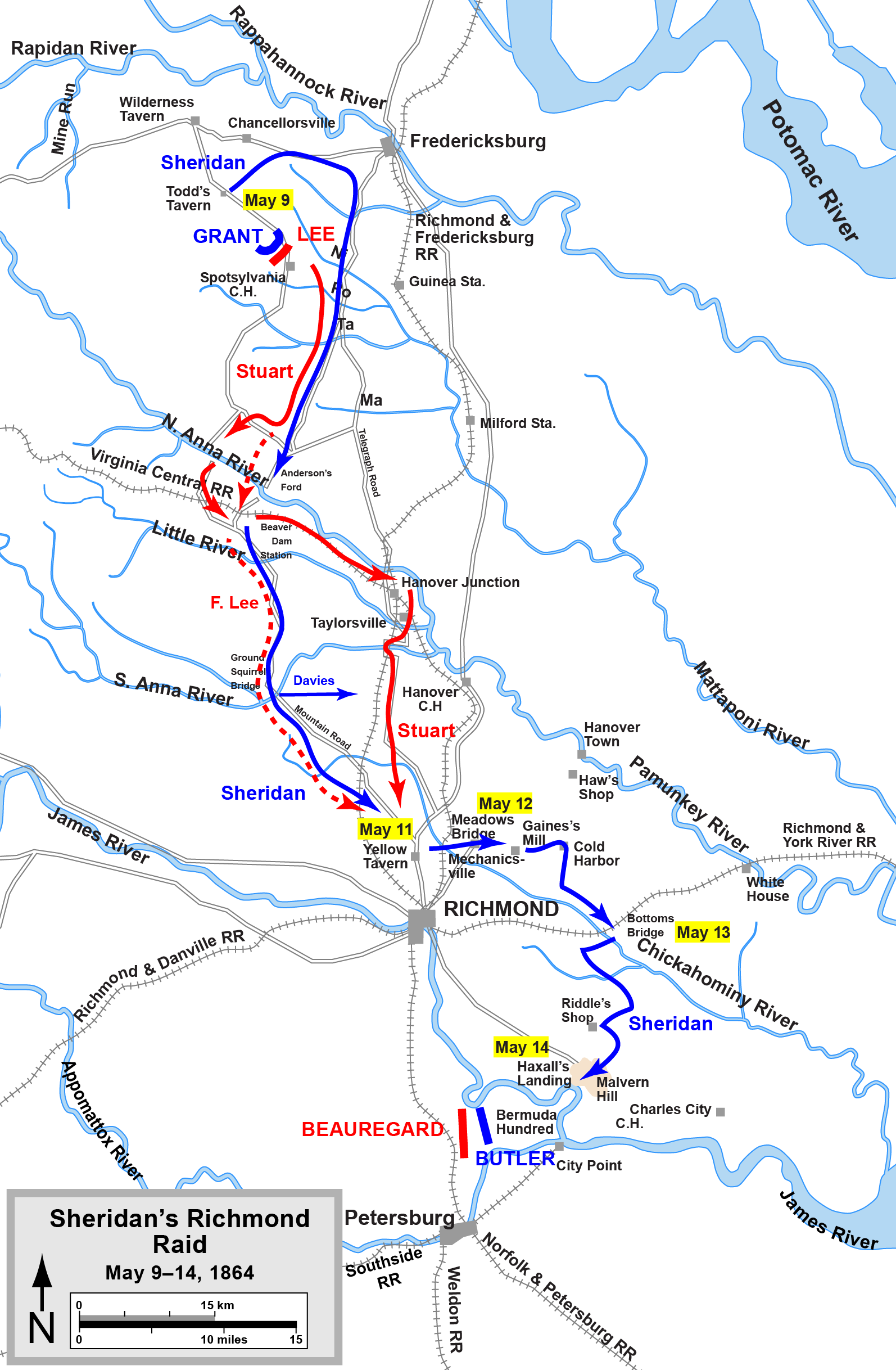
Sheridan's Richmond Raid, including the Battles of Yellow Tavern and Meadow Bridge Confederate Union

Sheridan decided to force a crossing of the river at Meadow Bridge, where the Virginia Central Railroad crossed the river. Confederates had earlier dismantled the flooring on the road part of the bridge, rendering it temporarily useless, although the rest of the bridge was intact. Sheridan assigned the Michigan brigade of Brig. Gen. George A. Custer, part of Brig. Gen. Wesley Merritt's division, to seize the span and the high bluffs beyond. The rest of Sheridan's command had to hold the Confederates at bay while Custer executed his orders. The other two brigades in Merritt's division, commanded by Colonels Thomas C. Devin and Alfred Gibbs, guarded the center of the Union line to protect against Confederate advances out of the Richmond fortifications. On the western end of the Union line, near Brook Church, the division of Brig. Gen. David McM. Gregg had to resist the advance of Brig. Gen. James B. Gordon's brigade. On the eastern end, Brig. Gen. James H. Wilson was to oppose any Confederate advances along Meadow Bridge road and Mechanicsville Pike.

The rearguard of the Gregg's division was assailed on three sides as soon as it was light enough for a brigade of Confederate infantry to sally forth from the fortifications and attack. Soon, other Confederates, including Richmond citizens hastily pressed into military service, joined in the efforts to break through the rear lines. According to the regimental historian of the veteran 1st Pennsylvania Cavalry,

Every effort was made by the enemy to break the lines of our division and push us back into the river and swamp. But as often as he came up, he was driven back with heavy loss. The fighting continued thus, the enemy charging, time after time, only to be hurled back, until about eleven A.M., when, apparently completely disheartened by his repeated repulses, he withdrew...

Wilson's men were initially pushed back in some confusion, but Gregg had concealed a heavy line of skirmishers armed with repeating carbines in a brushy ravine. His men poured forth a destructive fire, halting the final Confederate advances, assisted by some of Wilson's men who turned the flank of the attacking column. Federal horse artillery made sure that the Confederate infantry no longer was a threat, and three mounted cavalry regiments skirmished with approaching enemy cavalry, turning them aside and protecting the rear. Brig. Gen. Gordon was mortally wounded in the fighting and died on May 18.

In the meantime, Custer's 5th Michigan Cavalry used snipers to suppress Confederate rifle fire while several daring dismounted troopers crossed the damaged railroad bridge, hopping from railroad tie to tie while menaced by persistent enemy artillery fire. Followed by the 6th Michigan, they succeeded in the early afternoon in clearing the north bank of the Chickahominy and gaining a foothold on the Confederate side of the river. Custer's men pinned down the remaining threatening enemy units and captured two artillery pieces, while pioneers energetically planked the bridge to provide safe passage for large numbers of men and horses. By mid-afternoon, Merritt's entire division had crossed and engaged the hastily built Confederate works on Richmond Heights, driving the defenders back to Gaines's Mill. By 4 p.m., the rest of Sheridan's cavalry had crossed the river.

Sheridan destroyed the Virginia Central Bridge in his wake to prevent further pursuit. For the balance of the day, Sheridan's men collected their wounded, buried their dead, grazed their horses in the pastures, and eagerly read Richmond newspapers, which two enterprising small boys had brought across the lines and sold to the Union soldiers.

== Aftermath ==
After his men had rested, Sheridan brushed aside the remaining Confederate resistance in the area and marched his column to Mechanicsville, out of harm's way. They bivouacked that night at Gaines's Mill, which was burned the following morning by some of the stragglers; Sheridan ordered a bucket brigade to douse the flames. Upon reaching Bottom's Bridge over the Chickahominy, they found it had also been damaged and rested there for the night while it was repaired. By this time, Sheridan's men were suffering from hunger and it was becoming urgent that they reach Union lines. On May 14, he led his men to Haxall's Landing on the James River, ending his raid.

Sheridan reported 170 casualties for the Meadow Bridges, Mechanicsville, Strawberry Hill, Brook Church (or Richmond Fortifications), engagements, May 12, 1864. Confederate losses are not recorded.

Sheridan's raid was an overall tactical success, having killed Jeb Stuart at Yellow Tavern and beaten Fitzhugh Lee at Meadow Bridge, all with relatively minimal casualties—about 625 men for the entire raid, compared to 800 Confederate. From a strategic standpoint, however, the raid deprived General Grant of the cavalry resources that would have been helpful during the Battle of Spotsylvania Court House and his subsequent advance to the North Anna River, and there are lingering questions about whether Sheridan should have attempted to assault the city of Richmond. In the latter case, Sheridan believed it would not have been worth the risk in casualties and he recognized that the chances of holding the city for more than a brief time would be minimal; any advantages would primarily result from damage to Confederate morale.
