= Willis J. Dance =

Confederate artilleriet (1821–1887)

Willis J. Dance (1821-1887) served as a Confederate artillerist in the American Civil War.

== Pre-War ==
Willis Jefferson Dance was born in Powhatan County, Virginia on June 21, 1821. He was educated at Hampden-Sydney College and from 1837 - 1839, the University of Virginia. In 1860, Dance lived in Eggleston's District in Powhatan County, Virginia, using the Post Office at Powhatan Court House. He was 38 years old and married to Margaret C. Dance, age 37; their only child had died in infancy. Dance had real estate valued at $3,500 and personal property valued a $10,000. He was an attorney and a slave owner.

== Civil War ==
After the outbreak of war, Willis Dance was commissioned captain of the Powhatan Light Artillery on July 16, 1861. He commanded his battery in the Army of Northern Virginia. His battery served in the First Virginia Light Artillery under J. Thompson Brown in the Maryland Campaign at the time of the Battle of Antietam, when the battery guarded a ford near Shepherdstown, West Virginia, and the Battle of Fredericksburg in BG William N. Pendleton’s artillery reserve. At Fredericksburg, Dance's battery sent guns to help Major John Pelham protect the far right of Stonewall Jackson’s corps.

Brown's command served in the artillery reserve of Jackson's corps, under Col Stapleton Crutchfield at the Battle of Chancellorsville. With the death of Jackson, his corps was reorganized with Ltg Richard S. Ewell as commander. Col Brown was promoted to command of the artillery reserve of Ewell's Corps. Dance became acting commander of Brown's artillery battalion in the Gettysburg campaign. Guns from his battalion were engaged on Seminary Ridge on July 2 and 3, 1863 during the Battle of Gettysburg. These batteries were engaged against federal batteries on Cemetery Hill.

Dance returned to battery command after Gettysburg. He was in BG Armistead L. Long’s artillery command in Ewell's corps. The battalion was led by Brown and then by Ltc Robert A. Hardaway in the Bristoe Campaign. In the absence of both officers, Dance briefly led the battalion in the Mine Run Campaign.

Dance commanded his battery in the Overland Campaign and early in the Siege of Petersburg. At the Battle of Spotsylvania, Dance's battery, with much of Hardaway's battalion, was in the second line of Ewell's corps when the federal II Corps broke through the Confederate defenses. Dance's guns were moved up to stall the Union advance while southern infantry was brought to plug the gap.

Capt Dance served in the Richmond defenses with Hardway as his battalion leader. Capt Dance was wounded at the Battle of Chaffin's Farm in September 1864 shortly after the fall of Fort Harrison. His battery was instrumental in preventing the Union Army of the James from expanding its breakthrough of the Confederate defenses. When wounded, Dance was acting commander of Hardaway's battalion. Capt Dance continued with his battery to the end of 1864.

Capt Dance went on sick leave in early 1865. He was promoted to the rank of major on March 1 1865, while convalescing.

== Post war ==
Maj Dance resumed law practice after the war. His nephew Thomas Maurice Miller became a law partner in 1870. Willis Dance died on February 13, 1887. Some of letters from his sister can be found in the Virginia Eppes (Dance) Campbell, Papers, 1858–1865, of the Virginia Historical Society.
