= Battle of Gloucester Point (1861) =

Battle in the American civil war

Coordinates: 37°16′12″N 76°29′55″W

- Part of the Eastern theater of the American Civil War
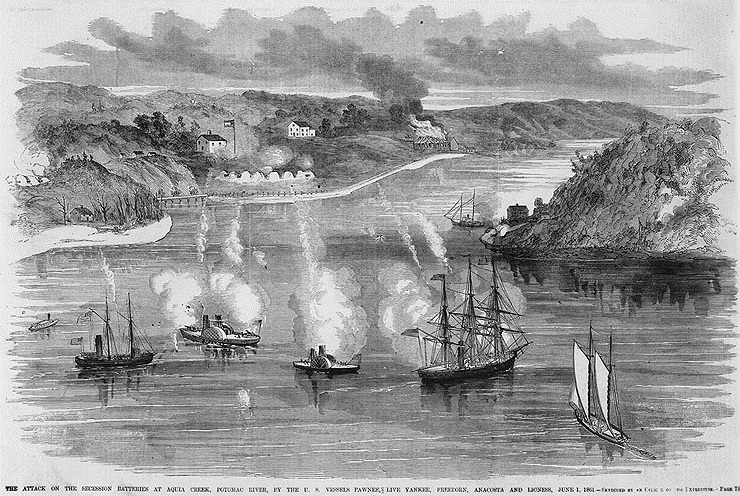
- USS Yankee at the attack on the Confederate Batteries at Aquia Creek, 1 June 1861
Date	May 7, 1861
Location	Gloucester Point, Virginia
Result	Inconclusive

Belligerents
United States (Union)	Virginia

Commanders and leaders
Garrett J. Pendergrast; Thomas O. Selfridge Jr.	William B. Taliaferro; William C. Whittle; John Thompson Brown

Units involved
USS Yankee (1861)	Battery garrison

Strength
1 gunboat	60–70

Casualties and losses
None	None

The Battle of Gloucester Point, Virginia was the first reported exchange of fire in the American Civil War, following the surrender of Fort Sumter. As Lincoln extended the Union blockade to include Virginia, Virginia (soon to be Confederate) forces tried to deny Union access to the local estuaries. On May 7, 1861, Lieutenant Thomas O. Selfridge Jr. commanding the USS Yankee was ordered to reconnoitre the new fortifications at Gloucester Point opposite Yorktown. Shots were exchanged, causing no casualties, Selfridge claiming that his guns were too small to damage the battery, commanded by Lieutenant John Thompson Brown, credited with firing the first cannon shot of the war in Virginia.

== Background ==
On April 15, 1861, the day after the U.S. Army garrison surrendered Fort Sumter to Confederate forces, President Abraham Lincoln called for 75,000 volunteers to suppress the rebellion of the seven Deep South Slave states that had formed the Confederate States of America and to reclaim the federal property that had been seized by the Confederacy. Four Upper South States that permitted slavery, including Virginia, refused to furnish troops for this purpose and immediately began the process of secession from the Union to join the Confederacy.

On April 17, 1861, the delegates previously elected to the Virginia Secession Convention in Richmond, Virginia passed an ordinance of secession from the Union. The ordinance was subject to a ratification vote of the people of the state to be held on May 23, 1861, but the actions of the convention and Virginia's Governor John Letcher effectively took Virginia out of the Union before the vote could be taken, as the convention authorized the governor to call for volunteers to join the military forces of Virginia to defend the state against Federal military action.

On April 22, 1861, Governor Letcher appointed Robert E. Lee as commander in chief of Virginia's army and navy forces. On April 24, 1861, Virginia and the Confederate States agreed that the Virginian forces would be under the overall direction of the Confederate President, pending completion of the process of Virginia joining the Confederate States. As these developments showed that Virginia would complete the process of secession, President Lincoln did not wait for the people's vote before he took action against Virginia, treating it as part of the Confederacy. On April 27, 1861, Lincoln extended the blockade of the seven original Confederate States which he had declared on April 19, 1861, to include the ports of Virginia and North Carolina.

On May 3, 1861, Major General Robert E. Lee of the Virginia forces appointed Colonel William B. Taliaferro commander of defenses at Gloucester Point, Virginia on the York River opposite Yorktown, Virginia. General Lee instructed the colonel to cooperate with Virginia Navy Captain William C. Whittle in the construction and defense of a shore battery to cover the York River at that location. On May 6, 1861, Taliaferro ordered a company of fifty men of the Richmond Howitzers, a Virginia volunteer artillery regiment, with two six-pounder cannons, to report to Gloucester Point to assist in the defense and operation of the shore battery. The artillerymen arrived at Gloucester Point early on May 7, 1861. This force had not yet been formally transferred to the Confederate States Army or Confederate States Navy, but the Virginians were acting in concert with the Confederacy and in its defense.

== Battle ==
In early May 1861, the Union Navy already had learned that rebel Virginia forces were constructing fortifications at Gloucester Point, Virginia on the York River. On May 7, 1861, Union Flag Officer Garrett J. Pendergrast ordered Navy Lieutenant Thomas O. Selfridge Jr. to examine the reported fortifications. On the same day, Lieutenant Selfridge, in command of the USS Yankee, a converted steam tugboat of 328 tons displacement with 2 guns, sailed the Yankee up the York River in a reconnaissance with the purpose of developing intelligence on the fortifications at Gloucester Point. As the Yankee approached to within about 2,000 yards of the shore battery, the battery fired a shot across the boat's bow. The Yankee slowly continued on its course. The battery then fired another shot at the boat.

Lieutenant Selfridge reported that the shore battery fired 12 shots at the Yankee, but in a later account, T. Roberts Baker of the Richmond Howitzers stated that the Virginia force had fired 13 shots. Lt. Selfridge reported that all but 2 of the battery's shots were short. The Yankee fired 4 shots and 2 shells at the battery in return. Selfridge stated that he could not hit the opposing force's guns because of their elevation and because his guns were too small to damage the battery and fortifications in any event. The Yankee's guns were "light 32s". Selfridge opined that the Rebels had 2 "long 32s" and an "8-inch shell". He thought the rebels had a force of about 40 men. In fact, the battery only had smaller "six-pounder" guns on this date.

After this exchange of cannon fire, the Yankee turned around and headed for its base at Hampton Roads near Fort Monroe. Selfridge did not mention damage to the Yankee in his report. T. Roberts Baker of the Virginia force recalled that two shots from the battery hit the Yankee. Neither side reported any of their men as killed or wounded.

Despite Baker's later account that Colonel Taliaferro directed the actions of the Richmond Howitzers at Gloucester Point on May 7, Colonel Taliaferro stated in a report on May 8, 1861, that he arrived at Gloucester Point after the engagement had taken place. He said that Captain Whittle had directed the firing at the Yankee. Whittle denied this. Lieutenant John Thompson Brown of the Richmond Howitzers was in immediate command of the small force of artillerymen who manned the battery at this time. Some sources credit him with firing the first cannon shot of the Civil War in Virginia. Brown was promoted to captain on May 9, 1861.

== Aftermath ==
By May 11, 1861, the Virginians had placed two nine-inch (229 mm) guns at the battery at Gloucester Point and had two more ready for placement there. By June 25, 1861, the Confederates had fourteen heavy guns in place at the battery. The men of the Richmond Howitzers were relieved and moved from Gloucester Point to Yorktown on May 26, 1861. The Richmond Howitzers participated in the Battle of Big Bethel, Virginia on June 10, 1861.

Similar minor engagements between Union gunboats and Virginia shore batteries occurred soon after the action at Gloucester Point at the Battle of Sewell's Point, the Battle of Aquia Creek and the Battle of Pig Point.

The Confederates abandoned the naval batteries at Gloucester Point and Yorktown overnight on May 3–4, 1862. They took this action during the Confederate retreat up the Peninsula toward Richmond during the Peninsula Campaign.

Captain John Thompson Brown ultimately became a colonel. He was commander of the artillery for the 2d Corps of the Army of Northern Virginia at the Battle of Gettysburg. Brown was in charge of a division of three battalions of artillery at the Battle of the Wilderness when he was killed in action on May 6, 1864.
