= Philemon Tracy =

American judge (1831–1862)

Philemon Tracy (June 27, 1831 – September 18, 1862) was an American judge, newspaper editor, and politician.

Tracy was born in Macon, Georgia, the son of Judge Edward Dorr Tracy Sr. His mother, Susan Campbell Tracy, was the sister of John Archibald Campbell, who served on the Supreme Court of the United States from 1853 to 1861, and his brother, Edward Dorr Tracy Jr., was a Confederate general.

He graduated from Yale College in 1850. After leaving college he established himself in the practice of Law in his native town, where he edited the Macon Telegraph and held the position of Probate Judge. In 1860, he was a member of the Georgia Legislature. He afterwards held the post of a Major in the 6th Georgia Volunteer Infantry, and while acting as such in the battles near Richmond, Virginia, in July, 1862, he was severely wounded. He was killed at the battle of Antietam, after being shot in the leg, at the age of 31. His body would then be buried with family in Batavia, New York, where he remains to this day.

He was married to Mrs. Caroline Walker, who died about a year after their marriage, leaving no children.
