= James B. Gordon =

Confederate Army general (1822-1864)

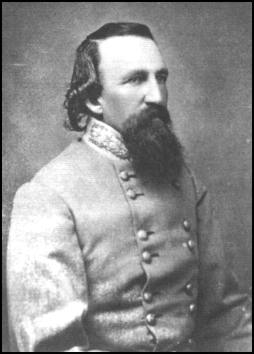
- Born: November 21, 1822; Wilkes County, North Carolina
- Died: May 18, 1864 (aged 41); Richmond, Virginia
- Burial place: St. Paul's Episcopalian Church Cemetery; Wilkesboro, North Carolina
- Military career
- Allegiance: Confederate States of America
- Branch: Confederate States Army Cavalry
- Service years: 1861 – 1864
- Rank: Brigadier General
- Unit: 1st North Carolina Infantry Regiment
- Commands: 1st North Carolina Cavalry Regiment; North Carolina Cavalry Brigade
- Conflicts: American Civil War: Battle of Meadow Bridge †

James Byron Gordon (November 2, 1822 – May 18, 1864) was a brigadier general in the Confederate States Army during the American Civil War. He was killed in action at the Battle of Meadow Bridge.

== Early life ==
Gordon was born in Wilkes County, North Carolina to Nathaniel and Sarah Gwyn Gordon. James B. Gordon was a distant cousin of Confederate General John Brown Gordon. After studying at Emory and Henry College in Emory, Virginia, he returned to Wilkes County and became a successful mercantile businessman and a prominent member of the community. He served several terms as a Wilkes County commissioner and spent one term in the North Carolina state legislature.

== Civil War ==
With the outbreak of the Civil War in 1861, Gordon enlisted as a lieutenant in the "Wilkes County Guards". This unit was merged into the 1st North Carolina Infantry Regiment. Gordon went to the cavalry and was promoted to captain, and then major, of the 1st North Carolina Cavalry Regiment. He served under the command of famed Confederate cavalry general J.E.B. Stuart for most of the war. On November 26, 1861, Gordon led the first charge of his regiment and won praise for his bravery from General Stuart. In early 1862, he was promoted to lieutenant colonel, and a year later was made a full colonel of cavalry.

During the Army of Northern Virginia's retreat after the Battle of Gettysburg in July 1863, Colonel Gordon defeated Union forces at Hagerstown, Maryland, thereby helping the Confederates escape into Virginia. In September 1863, he was promoted to brigadier general and assigned command of the North Carolina Cavalry Brigade. He defeated Union troops in a battle near Culpeper Court House in October 1863, but was seriously wounded shortly afterwards. In May 1864, Gordon joined with other Confederate cavalry units under J.E.B. Stuart to halt the advance of Union Maj. Gen. Philip Sheridan towards Richmond, Virginia, the Confederate capital.

== Death ==
On May 11 Stuart was killed in the Battle of Yellow Tavern, and Gordon assumed the role of defending Richmond. On May 12, 1864, Gordon's cavalry held Sheridan's troops at Meadow Bridge, just north of Richmond, long enough for Confederate reinforcements to arrive and save the city. However, Gordon was mortally wounded in this battle and died within a week. He was buried with full military honors in the cemetery of St. Paul's Episcopal church in Wilkesboro, North Carolina.

== See also ==
- List of American Civil War generals (Confederate)
