= Birkett D. Fry =

Confederate general in the American Civil War

Birkett Davenport Fry
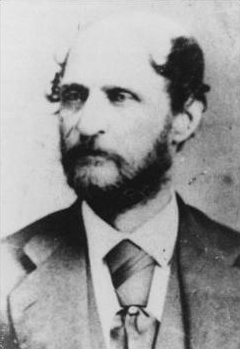
- Born: June 24, 1822; Kanawha County, Virginia, U.S.
- Died: January 21, 1891 (aged 68); Richmond, Virginia, U.S.
- Burial place: Oakwood Cemetery (Montgomery, Alabama)
- Military career
- Allegiance: United States; William Walker’s Nicaragua; Confederate States
- Branch: United States Army; Walker's filibuster army Confederate States Army
- Service years: 1847–1848 (USA); 1861–1865 (CSA)
- Rank: First lieutenant (USA); Brigadier general (CSA)
- Conflicts: Mexican-American War; Walker's Nicaragua Expedition; American Civil War: Peninsula Campaign; Battle of Seven Pines; Battle of Antietam; Battle of Chancellorsville; Battle of Gettysburg; Siege of Petersburg; Battle of Meadow Bridge

Birkett Davenport Fry (June 24, 1822 – January 21, 1891) was an American adventurer, soldier, lawyer, cotton manufacturer, and a Confederate brigadier general in the American Civil War. A survivor of four battle wounds, he commanded one of the lead brigades during Pickett's Charge at the Battle of Gettysburg.

== Early life ==
Fry was born in Kanawha County, Virginia (now West Virginia) on June 24, 1822. He received his education at Virginia Military Institute in Lexington, and attended the United States Military Academy, but did not graduate with the Class of 1846, having failed mathematics and been subsequently dismissed. He then returned to his native Virginia to study law. He resumed his interest in the military with the outbreak of the Mexican–American War, serving as a first lieutenant of voltigeurs (skirmishers).

Following the war, Fry moved to California as a "Forty-Niner." Fry practiced law in Sacramento City and was elected Justice of the Peace, Fourth Ward in 1852. In October 1856, he accompanied the filibusterer, William Walker, during his expedition to Nicaragua as a colonel (and later general) in Walker's mercenary army. Fry returned to California, living there until 1859 when he moved to Alabama and engaged in cotton manufacturing. Fry had married Martha MiCou, whose family were among the owners of the cotton mills in Tallassee, Alabama.

== Civil War ==
With Alabama's secession from the Union, Fry enlisted in the Confederate army and was appointed colonel of the 13th Alabama Infantry. The regiment was transported to Virginia and as part of Brig. Gen. James J. Archer's Brigade (which belonged to A. P. Hill's famous Light Division) fought in the Peninsula Campaign. Colonel Fry was wounded in action at the Battle of Seven Pines. He recovered in time to command his regiment during the Second Manassas Campaign and thereafter in Maryland in the fighting at Antietam, where he was again wounded, suffering a shattered arm.

Fry rejoined his regiment and led it in Archer's Brigade during the 1863 Battle of Chancellorsville, where he suffered a third wound. During the subsequent Gettysburg campaign, Archer's Brigade (with Fry's 13th Alabama) was among the first Confederate units to deploy into battleline and engage the Union cavalry of John Buford at the opening of the Battle of Gettysburg on July 1, 1863. The brigade was hit hard and Fry's men suffered considerable casualties after being driven off McPherson's Ridge by the arrival of the Federal Iron Brigade. General Archer was captured in the action (the first general to be taken prisoner from Lee's Army of Northern Virginia). Fry as the senior colonel assumed command of the brigade of Tennesseans and Alabamians. The shattered command was in reserve on July 2. For reasons that remain unsatisfactory and unclear, Fry's new command was tasked with a key part of the July 3 attack that became famous as Pickett's Charge. He suffered yet another wound that would cost him his leg near the Union lines. Fry was treated in a local field hospital then held as a prisoner of war at Fort McHenry in Baltimore.

There, rumors circulated that Fry had been involved in the August 1862 murder of Union general Robert L. McCook in Alabama. Fry's West Point classmate, John Gibbon, who ironically commanded the troops that had shot Fry at Gettysburg, vouched for his character and the matter was forgotten.

Exchanged in the spring of 1864, Fry was briefly assigned to Robert Ransom's Department of Richmond at the beginning of the Bermuda Hundred Campaign, where he was assigned command of Seth Barton's brigade of Virginians, following that general's dismissal after the Battle of Chester Station. Fry was immediately ordered to move this brigade to Richmond to defend the capital against Philip Sheridan's Federal cavalry, which was thwarted at the Battle of Meadow Bridge on May 12. Fry's brigade then returned to Ransom at Drewry's Bluff, who had in the meantime been reinforced by P.G.T. Beauregard's army arriving from North Carolina. Fry's brigade then fought at the Battle of Proctor's Creek.

Fry subsequently rejoined Lee's Army of Northern Virginia and was assigned command of Archer's former brigade in Henry Heth's division of A.P. Hill's Third Corps for the Battle of Cold Harbor. Fry served during the Siege of Petersburg.

During the final months of the war, Fry was placed in command of a military district in South Carolina and Georgia.

== Postbellum ==
After surrendering in Augusta, Fry emigrated to Cuba at the close of hostilities, lodging in Havana hotels with several other former prominent Confederates, including Jubal A. Early, John C. Breckinridge, Robert A. Toombs, and John B. Magruder, among others. He did not return to the United States until 1868, when he returned to Tallassee, Alabama, as a businessman. He resided at No. 1, King Street, in a house built for Confederate Officers in charge of the Tallassee Armory. His home is still standing and after renovations now serves as the law offices of The Segrest Law Firm. Fry later expanded his business career in Florida, and, in 1881, moved to Richmond, Virginia, where he was president of a cotton mill for a decade.

Fry died in Richmond on January 21, 1891, and was buried in Oakwood Cemetery in Montgomery, Alabama.

== See also ==
- List of American Civil War generals (Confederate)
