= 1st North Carolina Infantry Regiment =

Infantry regiment of the Confederate States Army

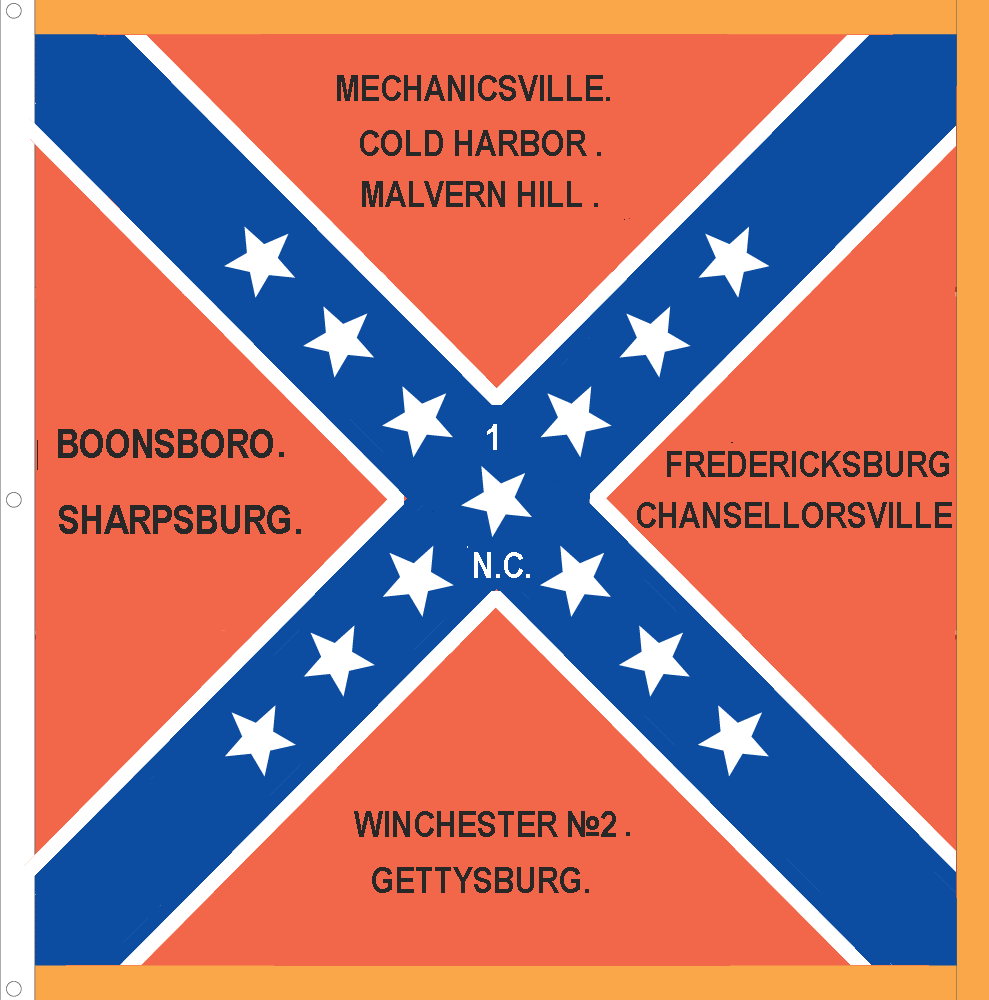
- Regimental flag of the 1st North Carolina
- Active: July, 1861 – April, 1865
- Country: Confederate States of America
- Allegiance: North Carolina
- Branch: Confederate States Army
- Type: Regiment
- Role: Infantry
- Size: ~1,600 (initial); 2,898 (total)
- Engagements: American Civil War

Commanders
- Regimental commanders: Col. Montford S. Stokes; Col. John A. McDowell; Col. Hamilton A. Brown
- Notable members: Brig. Gen. Matt W. Ransom; Brig. Gen. James B. Gordon

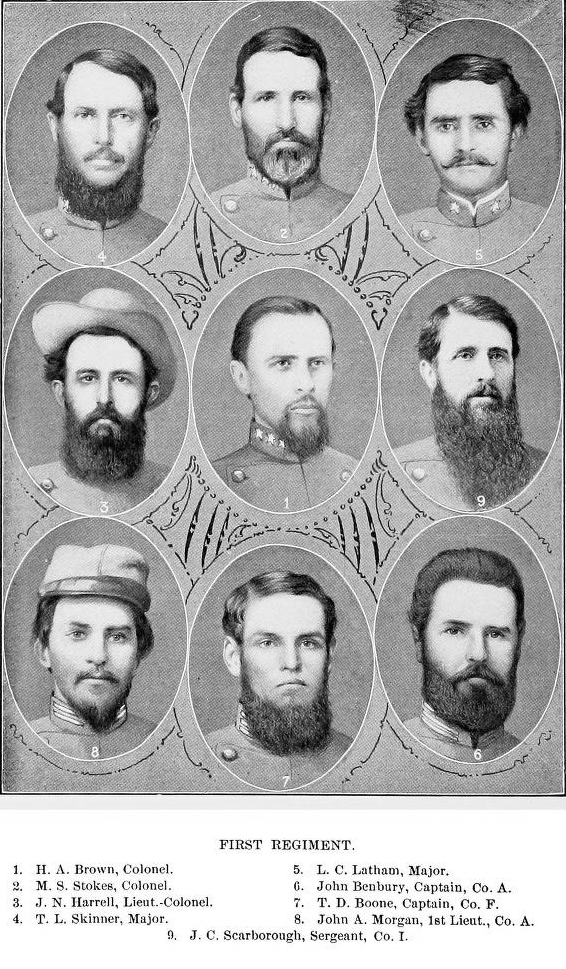
Officers of the 1st North Carolina Infantry

The 1st North Carolina Infantry Regiment was an infantry regiment of the Confederate States Army during the American Civil War. As part of the Army of Northern Virginia it fought in the Eastern Theater until the surrender at Appomattox.

== History ==
The 1st North Carolina Infantry was organized at the race track at Warrenton, North Carolina during the spring of 1861 and mustered in on June 3, 1861, with nearly 1600 officers and men hailing from eleven North Carolina counties. Colonel Montford S. Stokes, a son of North Carolina Governor Montfort

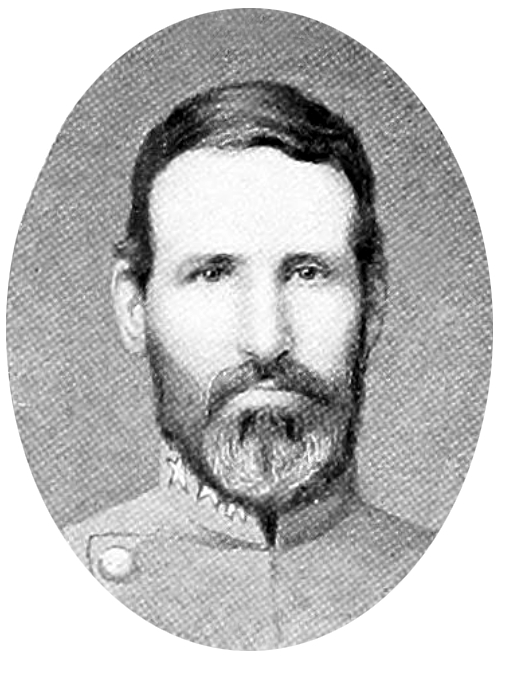
Col. Montfort Sidney Stokes

Stokes, became its commanding officer. He served in the Navy from 1832 to 1839 and also fought as a Major with the North Carolina Volunteers during the Mexican–American War. The other field officers were Lieutenant-Colonel Matt W. Ransom and Major John A. McDowell. The regiment initially served in Department of North Carolina, and after the First Manassas was relocated to Virginia.

The 1st North Carolina joined the Army of Northern Virginia and was brigaded under Brig. Gen. Roswell S. Ripley in the division of Maj. Gen. D.H. Hill.

On June 26, 1862, during the Battle of Beaver Dam Creek the 1st North Carolina suffered its first heavy casualties as fifty-four of their own were killed or mortally wounded and over one hundred wounded. Colonel Stokes was mortally wounded and died on July 14, 1862.

As part of the Second Corps, the 1st North Carolina participated in almost every battle the Army of Northern Virginia fought in the Eastern Theater.

The regiment surrendered with the army at Appomattox on April 9, 1865; fielding 10 officers and 61 enlisted men.

== Organization ==
- Company A (Albemarle Guards) – Chowan County
- Company B (Wilkes Volunteers) – Wilkes County
- Company C (Lillington Rifle Guards) – Harnett County
- Company D – Lincoln and Orange Counties
- Company E – New Hanover County
- Company F (Hertford Greys) – Hertford County
- Company G (Washington Volunteers) – Washington County
- Company H – Martin County
- Company I (Wake Light Infantry) – Wake County
- Company K – Halifax County

== See also ==
- List of North Carolina Confederate Civil War units
