= Adolph Proskauer =

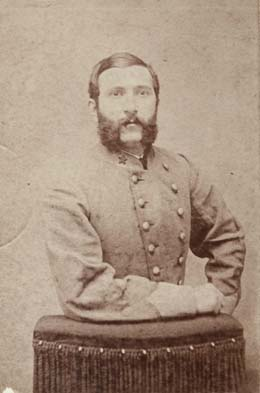
- Born: November 11, 1838; Possibly from City of Breslau in Lower Silesia, Germany (now Wrocław, Poland)
- Died: December 13, 1900 (aged 62); St. Louis, Missouri
- Burial place: New Mount Sinai Cemetery
- Military career
- Allegiance: Confederate States of America
- Branch: Confederate States Army
- Service years: 1861–1865
- Rank: Major
- Unit: 12th Alabama Infantry Regiment
- Conflicts: American Civil War: Battle of Seven Pines; Battle of Malvern Hill; Battle of Boonsboro; Battle of Antietam; Battle of Fredericksburg; Battle of Chancellorsville; Battle of Spotsylvania Court House; Gettysburg campaign; Battle of the Wilderness; Siege of Petersburg

Adolph Proskauer (1838–1900) was a Jewish officer in the army of the Confederate States of America during the United States Civil War. He rose to the rank of major.

Major Adolph Proskauer of Mobile, Alabama was wounded several times. A subordinate officer wrote "I can see him now as he nobly carried himself at Gettysburg, standing coolly and calmly with a cigar in his mouth at the head of the 12th Alabama amid a perfect rain of bullets, shot and shell. He was the personification of intrepid gallantry and imperturbable courage.

His nephew, Joseph M. Proskauer, was a prominent New York attorney, judge, and founding partner of the law firm Proskauer Rose.
