= Robert Ransom =

Robert Ransom Jr.
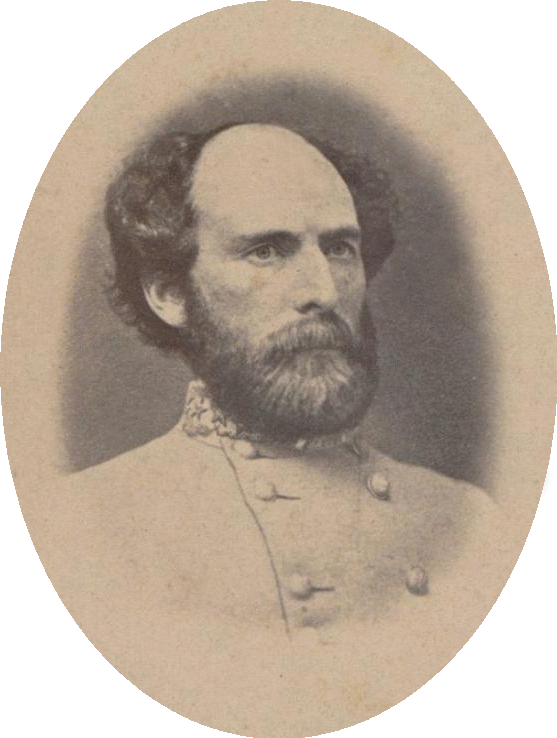
- Born: February 12, 1828; Warren County, North Carolina, US
- Died: January 14, 1892 (aged 63); New Bern, North Carolina, US
- Military career
- Allegiance: United States; Confederate States of America
- Branch: US Army; Confederate States Army
- Service years: 1850 – 1861 (USA); 1861 – 1865 (CSA)
- Rank: Captain (USA); Major General (CSA)
- Conflicts: American Civil War

Robert Ransom Jr. (February 12, 1828 – January 14, 1892) was a major general in the Confederate States Army during the American Civil War. His brother Matt W. Ransom was also a Confederate general officer and U.S. Senator.

== Early life ==
Ransom was born in Warren County, North Carolina, to Robert Ransom Sr. and Priscilla Whitaker Ransom. He graduated from the United States Military Academy at West Point in 1850. Ransom was assigned to the 1st dragoons on July 1, 1850. He attended the cavalry school at Carlisle Barracks in Carlisle, Pennsylvania in 1850–51. On October 9, 1851, he was promoted to second lieutenant. Ransom then performed frontier service in New Mexico from 1851 to 1854. Ransom married Minnie Huntt in 1854. He was assistant instructor of cavalry tactics at West Point from 1854 to 1855. In 1855 he was promoted to first lieutenant and transferred to the 1st U.S. Cavalry. Ransom served as adjutant of the regiment at Fort Leavenworth, Kansas from 1855 to 1857, where he took part in the Sioux expedition and in policing the Kansas disturbances. The next few years saw him in the recruiting service and frontier duty in Arkansas, Kansas and Colorado. He was also promoted to captain. He resigned his commission on January 31, 1861, with the discussion of secession and the sectional crisis that led to the Civil War.

== Civil War ==
He was initially appointed as a captain in the North Carolina cavalry in early 1861 and served with his regiment in Northern Virginia, where he fought in several minor skirmishes. On October 13, 1861, he was appointed to the colonelcy of the 1st North Carolina Cavalry Regiment. He commanded the Confederate forces at the skirmish around Vienna on November 26, 1861, and was afterward returned to North Carolina. On March 1, 1862, Ransom was promoted to brigadier general and fought on the Peninsula attached to Huger's Division.

He led his North Carolina brigade in the September 1862 invasion of Maryland and participated in the capture of Harpers Ferry and the Battle of Antietam. On November 7, he was placed in temporary command of the division and led it through the Battle of Fredericksburg, where Ransom's division had successfully defended Marye's Heights against the attacking Union Army.

In January 1863, Ransom and his brigade were sent back to North Carolina. In May he was promoted to major general and performed duty around Richmond, western Virginia, and eastern Tennessee. In May 1864 he led a division under General P.G.T. Beauregard in the defense of Drewry's Bluff against Union General Benjamin Butler. He was sent to command the cavalry in the Shenandoah Valley in the summer, under the command of General Jubal A. Early, where he participated in the battles of Monocacy and Fort Stevens.

He was relieved of command in August 1864 due to illness and never returned to front line service. He ended the war serving on military courts at administrative posts in Kentucky and at Charleston, South Carolina, before surrendering to Union troops on May 2, 1865.

== Postbellum career ==
Following the war, he was an express agent and city marshal at Wilmington, North Carolina, and then was a farmer until 1878. He then was a civil engineer in charge of Federal river and harbor works at New Bern, North Carolina. In 1881, his first wife died. The couple had nine children. In 1884, he married Katherine DeWitt Lumpkin and they had three children.

== Death ==
Ransom died in New Bern in 1892.

== See also ==
- List of American Civil War generals (Confederate)
