= 11th Alabama Infantry Regiment =

Infantry regiment of the Confederate States Army

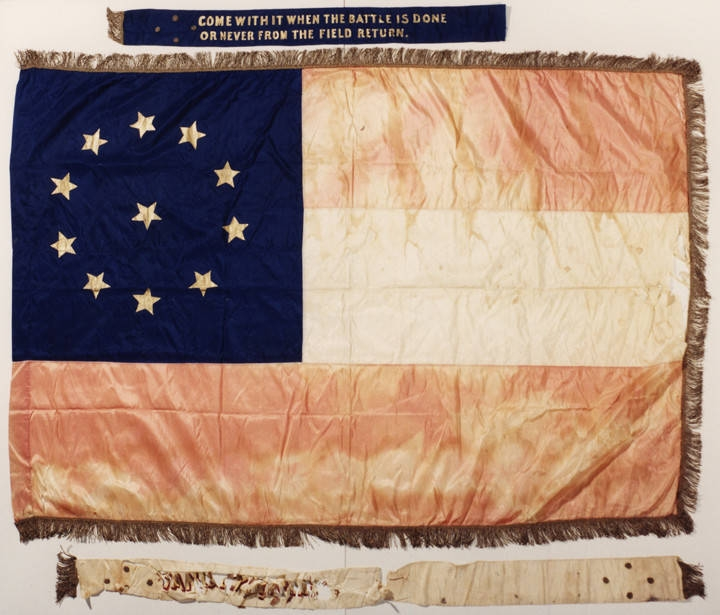
- Flag of Company E, 11th Alabama Infantry
- Active: June 17, 1861, to April 1865
- Country: Confederate States of America
- Allegiance: Confederate States Army
- Branch: Infantry
- Engagements: Battle of Seven Pines; Seven Days Battles; Second Battle of Manassas; Battle of Antietam; Battle of Fredericksburg; Battle of Chancellorsville; Gettysburg; Siege of Petersburg

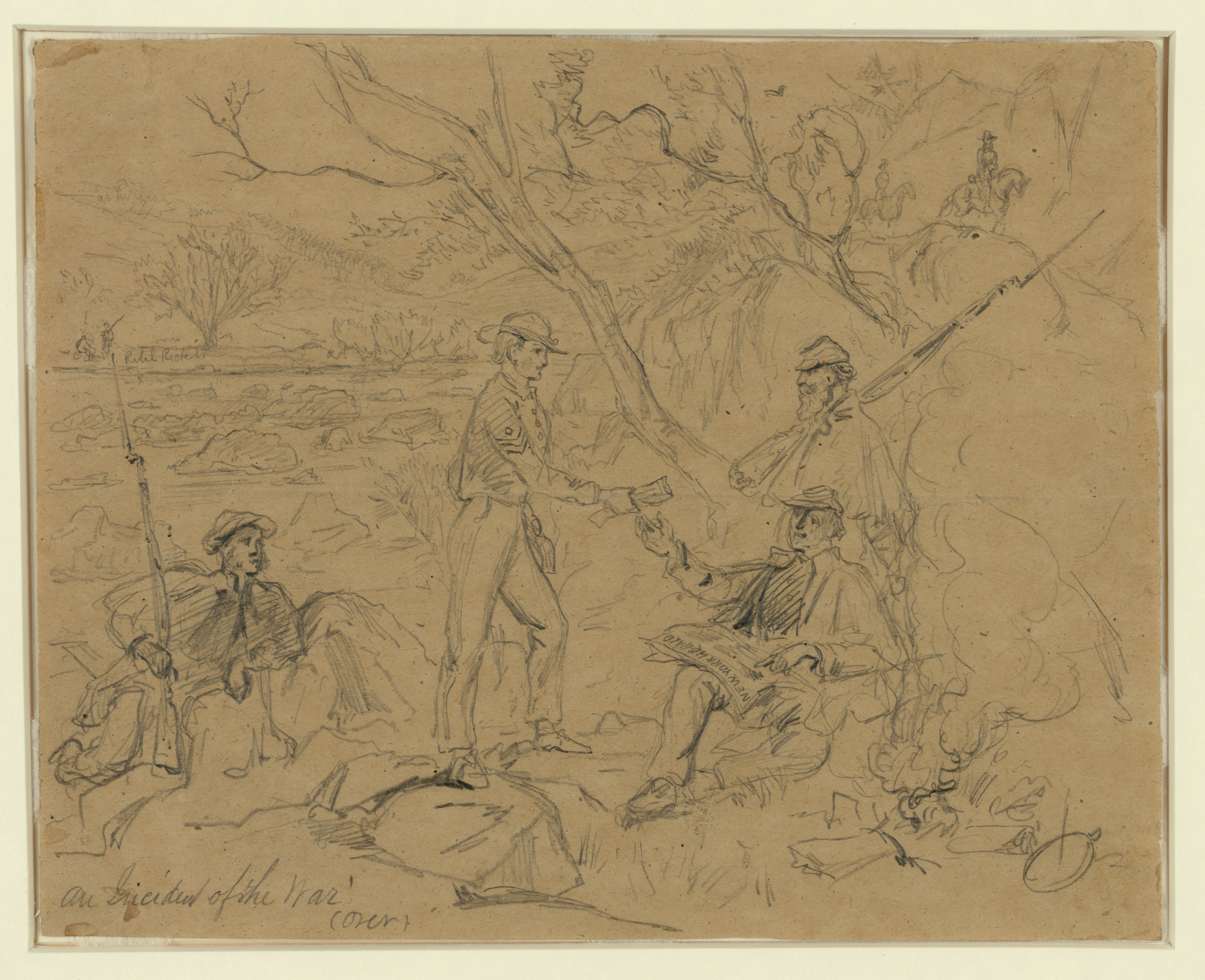
Soldiers in the 11th Alabama Infantry Regiment

The 11th Alabama Infantry Regiment was an infantry regiment that served in the Confederate Army during the American Civil War.

== Service ==
The 11th Alabama Infantry Regiment was mustered in at Lynchburg, Virginia, on June 17, 1861. Some of the companies making up the regiment had been already in service for several months at the time of mustering. The regiment surrendered at Appomattox Court House. The colors of the 11th Alabama Infantry were captured at the Battle of Antietam by the 57th New York Volunteers and was later one of 19 captured rebel flags stored in General McClellan's tent before being delivered to the U.S. War Department in October 1862.

== Total strength and casualties ==
The 11th mustered 1192 men during its existence. The regiment suffered approximately 270 killed in action or mortally wounded and 200 men who died of disease, for a total of approximately 470 fatalities. An additional 170 men were discharged from the regiment and 80 were transferred to other units.

== Commanders ==
- Colonel Sydenham Moore
- Colonel John C. C. Sanders
- Colonel George Edward Tayloe

== See also ==
- List of Confederate units from Alabama
