= John C. C. Sanders =

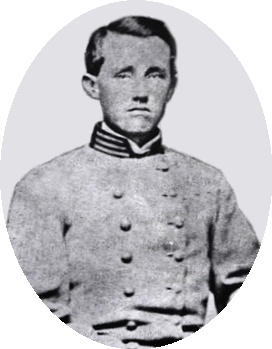
- Born: April 4, 1840; Tuscaloosa, Alabama, U.S.
- Died: August 21, 1864 (aged 24); Petersburg, Virginia, U.S.
- Burial place: Hollywood Cemetery; Richmond, Virginia reburied Greenwood Cemetery, Montgomery, Alabama, 1918
- Military career
- Allegiance: Confederate States of America
- Branch: Confederate States Army
- Service years: 1861–1864
- Rank: Brigadier General
- Commands: 11th Alabama Infantry; Sanders' Brigade
- Conflicts: American Civil War

John Caldwell Calhoun Sanders (April 4, 1840 – August 21, 1864) was one of the Confederate States Army's youngest brigadier generals during the American Civil War (Civil War). He was killed in the Battle of Globe Tavern along the Weldon Railroad during the Siege of Petersburg, Virginia on August 21, 1864.

== Early life ==
John C. C. Sanders was born on April 4, 1840, in Tuscaloosa, Alabama. He grew up in Clinton, Greene County, Alabama. He began studies at the University of Alabama in 1858 but left school to enlist in the Confederate States Army as a private at the outbreak of the Civil War in April 1861.

== American Civil War ==
John C. C. Sanders was elected captain of Company E of the 11th Regiment Alabama Volunteer Infantry on June 11, 1861.

The 11th Alabama Infantry first engaged in combat at the Battle of Seven Pines. During the following Seven Days Battles, after fighting in the Battle of Gaines Mill, Sanders was severely wounded in the leg by a shell fragment at the Battle of Glendale (Frayser's Farm), June 30, 1862, in Henrico County, Virginia. Nonetheless, he returned to command the regiment on August 11, 1862, as he was the senior officer on duty. He was wounded again at the Battle of Second Bull Run on August 30, 1862. Sanders was formally promoted to colonel after the Battle of Antietam (Sharpsburg, Maryland), September 17, 1862, where his face was wounded by stones thrown up by an exploding shell.

Sanders fought at the Battle of Fredericksburg, Battle of Salem Church, and Battle of Gettysburg, where he was wounded in the knee on July 2, 1863. While recovering, he served on court martial duty as the president of the division court martial. He returned to his regiment in time to command them in the Overland Campaign. He commanded Cadmus M. Wilcox's old brigade in Richard H. Anderson's division of III Corps of the Army of Northern Virginia in the Bristoe Campaign and Mine Run Campaign. Thereafter, Brigadier General Abner Monroe Perrin returned to command the brigade, and Sanders returned to command his regiment until Perrin was killed at the Battle of Spotsylvania Court House. Sanders then led his brigade and helped retake the "Mule Shoe" Salient. For his actions and services at Spotsylvania Court House, Sanders was promoted to brigadier general on May 31, 1864, under the section of the Confederate law permitting the appointment of temporary general officers.

Sanders was given command of a brigade of Alabama regiments formerly commanded by Brigadier General Cadmus M. Wilcox. He performed with competence and bravery during the Battle of Cold Harbor and the early engagements of the Siege of Petersburg. As part of Major General William Mahone's division, Sanders's brigade participated in the defense of the Confederate line during the Battle of the Crater, July 30, 1864, where he led his brigade in the Confederate counterattack.

Brigadier General Sanders was killed in action in an engagement along the Weldon Railroad in Virginia which is generally known as Battle of Globe Tavern (also known as the Second Battle of the Weldon Railroad), on August 21, 1864, when he was shot through both thighs and bled to death within a few minutes.

Sanders was buried in Hollywood Cemetery Richmond, Virginia. The Eichers state he was reinterred in Alabama in 1918.

== See also ==
- List of American Civil War Generals (Confederate)
