= 1st North Carolina Cavalry Regiment =

- Active: August 12, 1861 – April, 1865
- Country: Confederate States of America
- Allegiance: North Carolina
- Branch: Confederate States Army
- Type: Regiment
- Role: Cavalry
- Part of: Cavalry Corps, Army of Northern Virginia
- Organized at: Ridgeway, North Carolina
- Engagements: American Civil War: Peninsula Campaign; Battle of Antietam; Gettysburg campaign; Battle of Mine Run; Overland Campaign; Petersburg Campaign; Appomattox Campaign

Commanders
- Notable commanders: Col. Robert Ransom, Jr. Col. Lawrence S. Baker; Col. James B. Gordon; Col. Thomas Hart Ruffin; Col. William H. Cheek

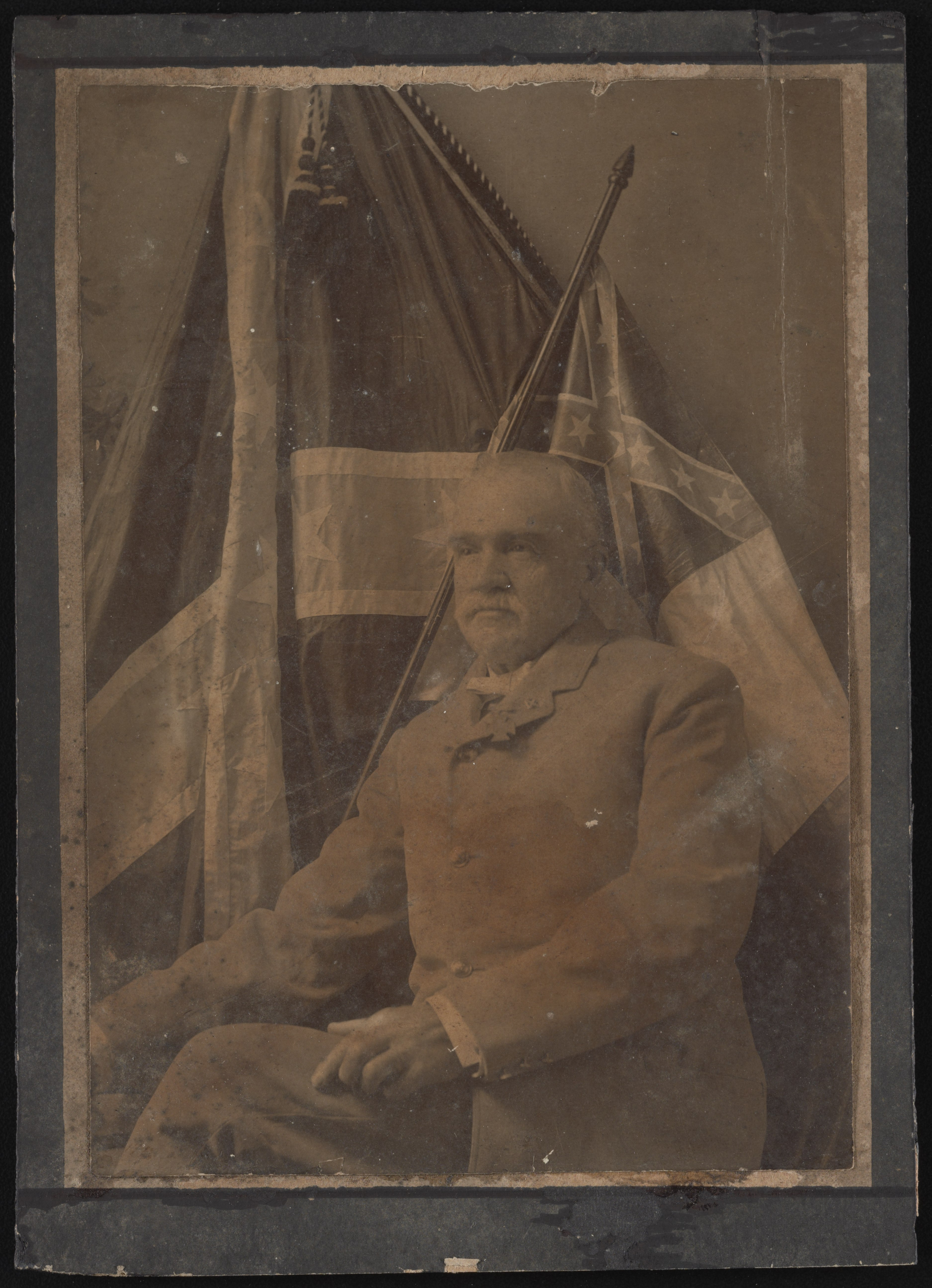
Confederate veteran Private Clark Robertson Starnes of Co. C, 1st North Carolina Cavalry Regiment in uniform with medals and Confederate flags. From the Liljenquist Family Collection of Civil War Photographs, Prints and Photographs Division, Library of Congress

The 1st North Carolina Cavalry Regiment, initially formed as 9th Regiment, North Carolina State Troops, was a cavalry regiment from North Carolina that served in the Confederate States Army during the American Civil War. Raised in 1861 it served all over the Eastern Theater until it surrendered with the Army of Northern Virginia in 1865.

== Companies ==
- Company A - Jefferson, Ashe County
- Company B - Rich Square, Northampton County
- Company C (Mecklenburg Rangers) - Charlotte, Mecklenburg County
- Company D (Watauga Rangers) - Boone, Watauga County
- Company E - Warrenton, Warren County
- Company F (Cabarrus Rangers) - Concord, Cabarrus County
- Company G (Buncombe Rangers) - Asheville, Buncombe County
- Company H - Goldsboro, Wayne County
- Company I - Kenansville, Duplin County
- Company K (Nantahala Rangers) - Franklin, Macon County

== Commanders ==
- Col. Robert Ransom, Jr. (promoted to brigadier general)
- Col. Lawrence S. Baker (promoted to brigadier general)
- Col. James B. Gordon (promoted to brigadier general)
- Col. Thomas Hart Ruffin (mortally wounded, died October 17, 1863)
- Col. William H. Cheek

== See also ==
- List of North Carolina Confederate Civil War units
