= Laurence S. Baker =

Confederate Army general (1830–1907)

Laurence Simmons Baker
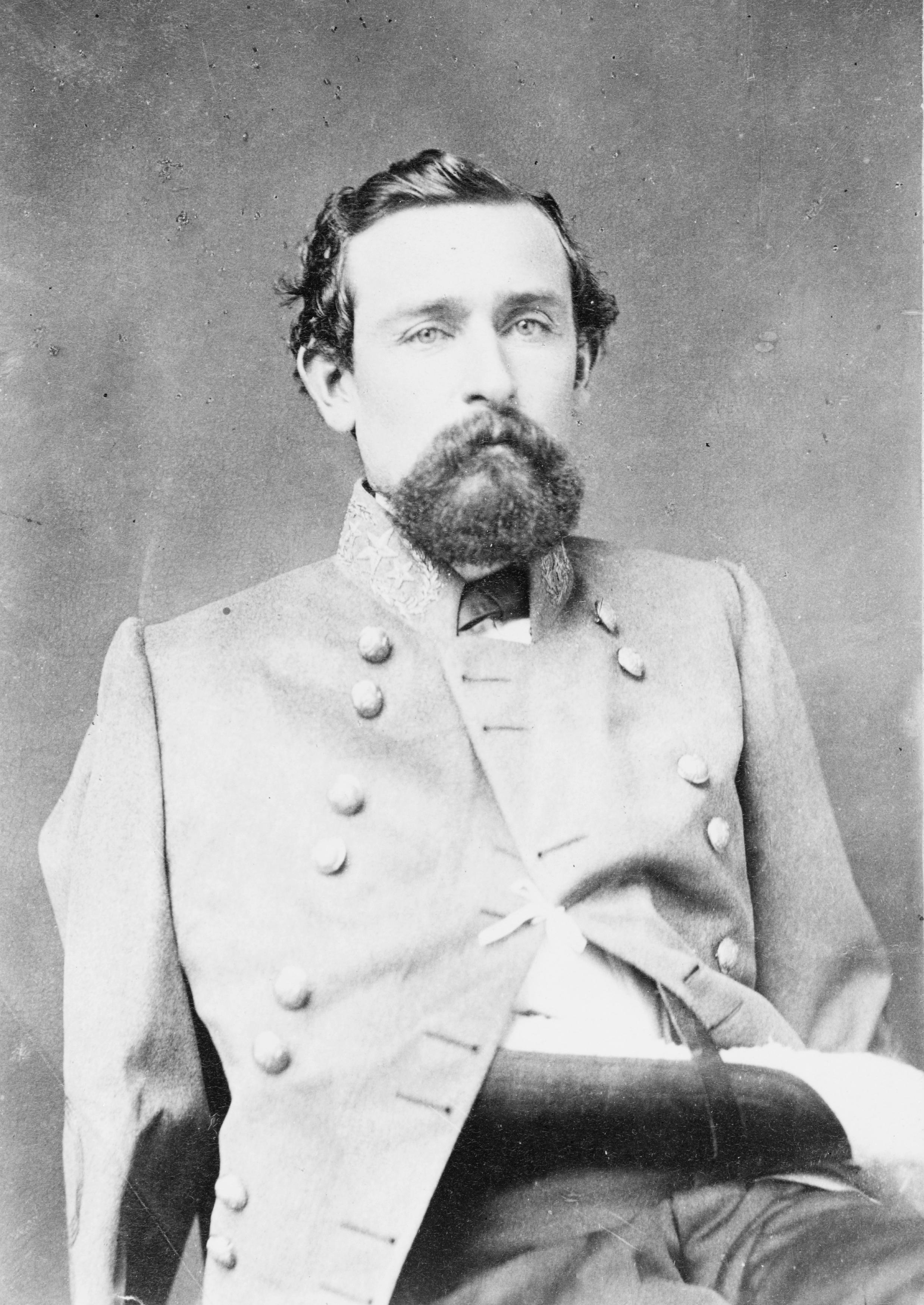
- Laurence Simmons Baker photo taken between 1861 and 1865
- Born: May 15, 1830; Gates County, North Carolina
- Died: April 10, 1907 (aged 76); Suffolk, Virginia
- Burial place: Cedar Hill Cemetery, Suffolk, Virginia
- Military career
- Allegiance: United States of America; Confederate States of America
- Branch: United States Army; Confederate States Army
- Service years: 1851–61 (USA); 1861–65 (CSA)
- Rank: First Lieutenant (USA); Brigadier General (CSA)
- Conflicts: American Civil War: Peninsula Campaign; Seven Days Battle; Second Battle of Bull Run; Battle of Antietam; Battle of Brandy Station; Battle of Gettysburg; Battle of Bentonville
- Other work: farmer, railroad station agent

Laurence Simmons Baker (May 15, 1830 – April 10, 1907) was an officer in the United States Army on the frontier, then later a brigadier general in the Confederate States Army during the American Civil War. His first name was spelled Lawrence in the records of the Confederate War Department and the mistaken spelling has persisted.

== Early life and career ==
Baker was born on the Cole's Hill Plantation in Gates County, North Carolina, the last of five children of Dr. John Burges and Mary Wynns (Gregory) Baker. His great-grandfather and namesake Lawrence Baker had been a general during the American Revolution. After receiving his initial schooling at the Norfolk Academy, he graduated from the United States Military Academy at West Point in 1851, placing 42nd (last in his class). After graduation, he was breveted a second lieutenant earning his full rank on Mar. 31, 1853. He served for nine years in the U.S. Mounted Rifles, assigned to duty on the western frontier and rising to the rank of first lieutenant.

On 13 Mar 1855, Laurence Baker married Elizabeth E. Henderson (1836–1918).

== Civil War ==
In May 1861, he resigned his commission when North Carolina seceded from the Union. Although personally opposed to the concept of secession, Baker was loyal to his state. He became the lieutenant colonel of the 1st North Carolina Cavalry Regiment, and was then promoted to colonel on March 1, 1862, leading the regiment in the 1862 Peninsula Campaign. He saw action at the Seven Days Battle, Second Battle of Bull Run (Second Manassas), and Battle of Antietam (Sharpsburg) later in 1862.

During the Gettysburg campaign, Baker was wounded at the Battle of Brandy Station. However, he capably led his men in a number of small cavalry actions, culminated in the fighting at East Cavalry Field at the Battle of Gettysburg. Baker assumed command of Brig. Gen. Wade Hampton's brigade when that officer was severely wounded by a saber slash. He was promoted to brigadier general on July 23, 1863, in recognition for his valiant service covering the retreat of the Army of Northern Virginia. Eight days later, he was severely wounded in the right arm while resisting a Federal crossing of the Rappahannock River, and was incapacitated for nearly a year.

After recovering enough for administrative duty, Baker was named commander of the Second Military District in his home state of North Carolina, overseeing the defense of vital railroads and supply lines. He briefly led a brigade into Georgia to help defend Savannah, but withdrew before the city surrendered. He also commanded the North Carolina Junior Reserves from 1864 until 1865, a predominantly recruiting and desk position. Despite his still painfully shattered arm, Baker returned to the field during the Carolinas campaign, including the Battle of Bentonville. He and most of his men did not surrender at the end of the war, preferring to try to cut his way through Union lines to join Joseph E. Johnston's army. Instead, he disbanded his brigade and the remaining men dispersed. Baker received his formal parole in Raleigh, North Carolina, in May 1865.

== Postbellum activities ==
After the war, Baker lived at New Bern, North Carolina, for a while before moving to Norfolk, Virginia, as a farmer. After returning to North Carolina, he was engaged in insurance until 1877. The next year, he joined the Seaboard and Roanoke Railroad in Suffolk, VA as a station agent, serving for 29 years. His duties included managing the Western Union telegraph and the Southern Express Co., a shipping company.

He was a member of St. Paul's Episcopal Church in Suffolk, Virginia, and was active in the local camp of the United Confederate Veterans. He died in Suffolk in 1907 and was buried in the city's Cedar Hill Cemetery.

Due to a clerical error in the War Department, in some official military documents, his first name is frequently misspelled as "Lawrence".

== See also ==
- List of American Civil War generals (Confederate)
