= J. Thompson Brown =

American military officer (1835–1864)

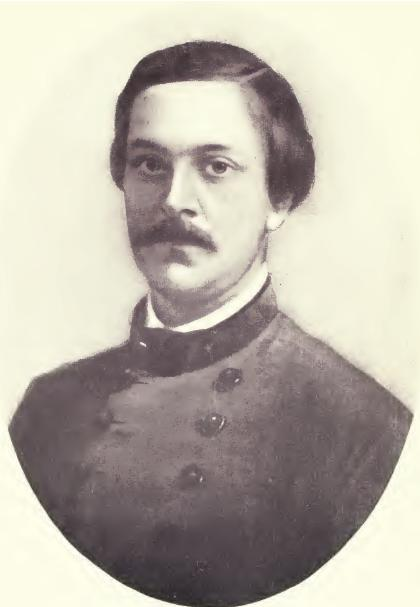
- J. Thompson Brown
- Born: February 6, 1835; Virginia, US
- Died: May 6, 1864 (aged 29); Spotsylvania County, Virginia
- Military career
- Allegiance: Confederate States of America
- Branch: Confederate States Army
- Service years: 1861–64
- Rank: Colonel (CSA)
- Conflicts: American Civil War

John Thompson Brown (February 6, 1835 – May 6, 1864) was an American military officer who served as a Confederate States Army colonel and artillerist in the American Civil War. He participated in the first exchange of cannon fire, in fact the first shots fired, between a Confederate force and a Union force in Virginia during the Civil War. Brown's company of the Virginia (soon to be Confederate) Richmond Howitzers artillery regiment, with Brown in command according to some sources, and a Union force, the gunboat USS Yankee, had a minor engagement at the Battle of Gloucester Point, Virginia on May 7, 1861. Neither side suffered casualties. Brown is credited by some sources with firing the first shot of the Civil War in Virginia at that first, minor engagement in the state. During the war, he advanced from the rank of first lieutenant to the rank of colonel in charge of a division of artillery in the Army of Northern Virginia. He was killed by a sharpshooter at the Battle of the Wilderness, May 6, 1864.

== Early life ==
John Thompson Brown was born in Virginia on February 6, 1835. He married Mary Southall on April 14, 1858. Brown was achieving prominence as a lawyer in Richmond, Virginia before the Civil War.

== Civil War ==
The Richmond Howitzers were organized in 1859 in response to John Brown's raid on Harpers Ferry, Virginia and expanded from volunteers not added to the First Regiment of Virginia Artillery in 1861. Captain (Major as of May 9, 1861) George W. Randolph took charge of the Howitzers Battalion. J. Thompson Brown, although not a trained soldier, was named second lieutenant of the second company. On May 7, 1861, Brown's second company of the battery fired its first shot from Gloucester Point, Virginia in the minor Battle of Gloucester Point, the first reported military action of the war in Virginia. The Howitzers fired against the Union Navy gunboat USS Yankee which was steaming up the York River from Hampton Roads. On May 9, 1861, Brown was elected captain of the second company. A month later, on June 10, 1861, Brown's battery fought at the Battle of Big Bethel, Virginia. Brown became a major in September 1861 and a lieutenant colonel in the spring of 1862.

Brown led the First Virginia Artillery as a battalion in the artillery reserve of the Army of Northern Virginia in the Seven Days Battles. Brown was promoted to the rank of colonel on June 2, 1862. He led the battalion at the Battle of Antietam and the Battle of Fredericksburg. In October 1862, Thompson was assigned to work with Brigadier General William N. Pendleton and Colonel, later Lieutenant General Stephen D. Lee to make recommendations for the reorganization of the army’s artillery. Pendleton recommended that Brown retain his battalion.

In 1863, at the Battle of Chancellorsville, Brown’s battalion served in the artillery brigade of Stonewall Jackson’s corps. Brown distinguished himself by protecting the Confederates involved in Jackson’s flanking movement from a probe by the federal III Corps. After the wounding of Colonel Stapleton Crutchfield, Brown became acting chief of artillery of Jackson’s corps.

During the reorganization of the army after the death of Jackson, Lieutenant General Richard S. Ewell took charge of II Corps. Colonel Brown became the commander of the artillery reserve of the corps. The battalions of Captain Willis J. Dance, formerly Brown’s own, and Lieutenant Colonel William Nelson served under him. Dance's battalion played a part in the Second Battle of Winchester. Their guns reached the field at the Battle of Gettysburg but too late for the fighting on July 1. Dance’s guns were employed on Seminary Ridge and Nelson’s near Benner’s Hill on July 2 and 3. Brown is among those criticized for the failure to get ammunition trains to the front, reducing the number of guns available for the grand bombardment on July 3. Brown’s gunners helped cover the retreat of the army to the Potomac River, reaching Hagerstown, Maryland on July 7. They were assigned on the left of General Robert E. Lee's defensive position near Williamsport, Maryland as the army waited to cross the river. Brown reported on the role of the corps' artillery in the campaign.

Shortly after Gettysburg, Lee named his military secretary, Brigadier General Armistead L. Long, chief of artillery of II Corps. Despite being the senior artillerist of the corps, Brown is not found on record complaining about Long’s promotion. Others, however, thought Long was promoted because of his West Point education. Brown returned to command of his battalion for the Bristoe Campaign and the Mine Run Campaign.

Before the Overland Campaign began, Long divided his corps artillery into two divisions. Brown took command of one. It contained the battalions of Nelson, Lieutenant Colonel Robert A. Hardaway and Lieutenant Colonel Carter M. Braxton. On May 6, 1864, while seeking a position for the guns in his division, Colonel J. Thompson Brown was killed by a sharpshooter. Brigadier Generals Pendleton and Long praised their fallen lieutenant for his character and skill.

William S. White, of the Third Richmond Howitzers, wrote:

Our battalion is called upon to mourn the loss of its former brave and efficient commander. Colonel John Thompson Brown, who fell early this morning shot through the head by a musket ball. Colonel Brown's name and influence were given to the Old Howitzer Company at its very organization, a short time prior to the "John Brown" raid, and upon that bloodless but exciting campaign the writer of this Journal became acquainted with him. At the commencement of the war he was a Second Lieutenant in the old company, and when the Howitzer battalion was formed he was unanimously chosen Captain of our Second Company. Holding that position until the formation of the First Reg-iment Virginia Artillery, he was promoted to a Majority, and then, in the reorganization of the army, in the Spring of 1862, he was made Colonel of that regiment. At Chancellorsville, Winchester, and Gettysburg he commanded, the artillery of our corps. No officer who has fallen during this war will be more deeply deplored by those under his immediate command than John Thompson Brown. His purse, ever open to assist the needy; his kind, warm heart ever eager to assist those in dis- tress; "and his gentle, winning manners won the love of all. Thus another Christian warrior has fallen, and ever will his memory be fondly cherished by those who were wont to look up to him more as a father than as a commanding officer. Peace to his ashes !"
