= Robert A. Hardaway =

American military officer (1829–1899)

Robert Archelaus Hardaway
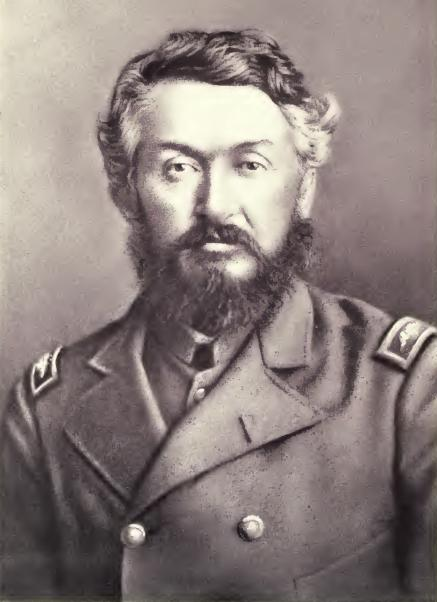
- Robert Archelaus Hardaway
- Born: February 2, 1829; Georgia
- Died: April 27, 1899 (aged 70); Columbus, Muscogee County, Georgia
- Military career
- Allegiance: Confederate States of America
- Branch: Confederate States Army
- Service years: 1861–65 (CSA)
- Rank: Lieutenant Colonel (CSA)
- Unit: Army of Northern Virginia
- Conflicts: American Civil War

Robert Archelaus Hardaway (February 2, 1829 – April 27, 1899) was an artillery officer in the Confederate Army of Northern Virginia during the American Civil War.

== Pre-war ==
Robert Archelaus Hardaway was a native of Georgia – born there Feb. 2, 1829; but he was raised in Alabama. His parents were Robert Stanfield Hardaway and his second wife, Martha Bibb Jarratt. Hardaway was educated at St. Joseph's College (Alabama), and Emory College, later Emory University, in Georgia. Hardaway served with the United States Army during the Mexican War, but the war ended before he could see combat. After that war, he was the superintendent of the Mobile and Girard Railroad. He resided in Macon County, Alabama, before the outbreak of war. Hardaway purchased his father’s plantation in 1857, becoming owner of its 60 slaves. On June 27 of the same year, he married Rebecca Elizabeth Hurt. They had three sons.

== Civil War ==
Hardway began the war as commander of an Alabama battery. It was recruited mostly in three counties, Macon, Russell and Tallapoosa. The battery was sent East, where it was mustered into the Confederate service on June 21, 1861. The battery was posted at Manassas, Virginia, until March, 1862. Hardaway’s command moved to the Virginia Peninsula, where it fought at the Battle of Seven Pines in the division of Maj. Gen. D. H. Hill. The battery took part in the Seven Days Battles. Hill’s division remained near Richmond, Virginia, until it departed to participate in the Maryland Campaign. Hardaway was commended by Confederate commanders for the conduct of his battery in the campaign. Later in the year, serving near Fredericksburg, Virginia, Hardaway’s gunners, using a Whitworth gun (designed by Joseph Whitworth, drove federal gunboats away from Port Royal, Virginia, on December 4, 1862. Both Hill and Stonewall Jackson commended Hardaway for his actions at the Battle of Fredericksburg. Shortly afterward, he was assigned command of an artillery battalion, and Captain William B. Hurt took command of the battery.

Apparently Hardaway was promoted to the rank of major on December 2, 1862, And to lieutenant colonel on Feb. 27, 1864. Col. Stapleton Crutchfield, Jackson’s chief of artillery, objected to the promotion, claiming that Hardaway was a fine gunner but hard on both men and horses. Nonetheless, the promotion of Hardaway went through. As a major, Hardaway became second in command of Lt. Col. John J. Garnett’s artillery battalion, attached to the division of Maj. Gen. Robert H. Anderson. The division fought at the Battle of Chancellorsville directly under the command of General Robert E. Lee. General Lee had Hardaway assemble a group of rifled guns to bombard the federal camps on morning of May 4, 1863. Hardaway became ill with dysentery, missing the Gettysburg campaign. He returned to active duty in time for the Bristoe Campaign in the fall of 1863.

In the Battle of the Wilderness, Hardaway commanded his battalion in the corps of Lt. Gen. Richard S. Ewell in the portion of the artillery contingent led by Col. J. Thompson Brown. The battalion continued in that corps throughout the Overland Campaign. Hardaway’s guns were in the second line of Ewell’s corps at the Battle of Spotsylvania Court House, but some of them were moved up to the line of a gorge to contain the federal breakthrough on May 11. When the corps, led by Jubal Early left to defend Lynchburg, Virginia, Hardaway’s battalion remained behind. It was assigned to the defenses of Richmond, Virginia, reporting to Brig. Gen. Edward Porter Alexander. The battalion played a role in the Battle of Chaffin's Farm and spent much of late 1864 assigned to the defenses of Chaffin's Bluff.

When the corps formerly led by Ewell and Early returned to the defenses of Petersburg, Virginia, with Maj. Gen. John B. Gordon as its commander, Hardaway’s battalion returned to that corps. Hardaway’s gunners served under Gordon in the Appomattox Campaign, firing one of the last shots before Lee’s surrender. Hardaway was paroled on May 10, 1865.

== Post war ==
After the war, returned to his plantation in Georgia. Then he went into railroad work, including as general manager of the East Alabama Railroad, 1869-1872. Hardway was an engineering professor at Auburn University from 1873 to 1881, and at the University of Alabama from 1882 to 1897. In between, he was an engineer for the Central Railroad in Mexico in 1881 and 1882. Hardaway died on April 27, 1899, in Columbus, Georgia.

Hardaway’s papers are at the University of North Carolina libraries as Collection Number 03006.

Hardaway Hall, University of Alabama, which was completed in 1936, was named for Professor Robert A. Hardaway.
