= Second Battle of Bull Run order of battle: Confederate =

The following Confederate States Army units and commanders fought in the Second Battle of Bull Run, called the Second Battle of Manassas by Confederate records, of the American Civil War. The Union order of battle is listed separately. Order of battle compiled from the army organization during the battle, the casualty returns and the reports.

== Abbreviations used ==
=== Military rank ===
- Gen = General
- MG = Major General
- BG = Brigadier General
- Col = Colonel
- Ltc = Lieutenant Colonel
- Maj = Major
- Cpt = Captain
- Lt = Lieutenant

=== Other ===
- (w) = wounded
- (mw) = mortally wounded
- (k) = killed in action
- (c) = captured

== Army of Northern Virginia ==
Gen Robert E. Lee, Commanding

=== Right Wing ===
MG James Longstreet

Division	Brigade	Regiments and Others
Anderson's Division; MG Richard H. Anderson	Armistead's Brigade BG Lewis A. Armistead	9th Virginia: Ltc James Gilliam; 14th Virginia: Col James Hodges; 38th Virginia: Col Edward C. Edmonds; 53rd Virginia: Ltc John Grammar; 57th Virginia: Ltc David Dyer; 5th Virginia Battalion
Anderson's Division; MG Richard H. Anderson	Mahone's Brigade BG William Mahone (w); Col David A. Weisiger	6th Virginia: Col George T. Rogers; 12th Virginia: Col David A. Weisiger; 16th Virginia: Col Charles A. Crump (k); 41st Virginia: Ltc William A. Parham
Anderson's Division; MG Richard H. Anderson	Wright's Brigade BG Ambrose R. Wright	44th Alabama: Ltc Charles A. Derby (w); 3rd Georgia; 22nd Georgia; 48th Georgia
Anderson's Division; MG Richard H. Anderson	Artillery Col Stephen D. Lee	Brooks (South Carolina) Artillery: Lt William Elliot; Ashland (Virginia) Artillery: Cpt Pichegru Woolfolk, Jr.; Bath (Virginia) Artillery: Cpt John L. Eubank; Bedford (Virginia) Artillery: Cpt Tyler C. Jordan; Portsmith (Virginia) Artillery: Lt Thomas J. Oakham; Parker's (Virginia) Battery: Cpt William W. Parker
Jones' Division; BG David R. Jones	Toomb's Brigade Col Henry L. Benning; BG Robert Toombs	2nd Georgia: Ltc William R. Holmes; 15th Georgia: Col William T. Millican; 17th Georgia: Maj John H. Pickett (w), Cpt Augustus C. Jones (k), Cpt Hiram L. French; 20th Georgia: Maj James D. Waddell
Jones' Division; BG David R. Jones	Drayton's Brigade BG Thomas F. Drayton	50th Georgia; 51st Georgia; Phillip's (Georgia) Legion; 15th South Carolina; 3rd South Carolina Battalion
Jones' Division; BG David R. Jones	Jones' Brigade Col George T. Anderson	1st Georgia (Regulars): Maj John D. Walker; 7th Georgia: Col William T. Wilson (mw); 8th Georgia: Ltc John R. Towers; 9th Georgia: Col Benjamin Beck; 11th Georgia: Ltc William Luffman; Wise (Virginia) Artillery
Wilcox's Division; BG Cadmus M. Wilcox	Wilcox's Brigade BG Cadmus M. Wilcox	8th Alabama: Maj Hilary A. Herbert; 9th Alabama: Maj Jere H. J. Williams; 10th Alabama: Maj John H. Caldwell; 11th Alabama: Cpt John C. C. Sanders; Thomas (Virginia) Artillery: Cpt Edwin J. Anderson
Wilcox's Division; BG Cadmus M. Wilcox	Pryor's Brigade BG Roger A. Pryor	14th Alabama: Ltc James A. Broome; 2nd Florida; 5th Florida; 8th Florida; 3rd Virginia: Col Joseph Mayo, Jr.; Donaldsonville (Louisiana) Artillery: Cpt Victor Maurin
Wilcox's Division; BG Cadmus M. Wilcox	Featherston's Brigade BG Winfield S. Featherston	12th Mississippi; 16th Mississippi: Col Carnot Posey; 19th Mississippi; 2nd Mississippi Battalion; Dixie (Virginia) Artillery: Cpt William H. Chapman
Hood's Division; BG John B. Hood	Hood's Brigade BG John B. Hood	18th Georgia: Col William T. Wofford; Hampton's (South Carolina) Legion: Ltc Martin W. Gary; 1st Texas: Ltc Phillip A. Work; 4th Texas: Ltc Benjamin F. Carter; 5th Texas: Col Jerome B. Robertson (w), Cpt King Bryan (w), Cpt Ike N. M. Turner
Hood's Division; BG John B. Hood	Whiting's Brigade Col Evander M. Law	4th Alabama: Ltc Owen K. McLemore; 2nd Mississippi: Col John M. Stone; 11th Mississippi: Col Philip F. Liddell; 6th North Carolina: Maj Robert F. Webb
Hood's Division; BG John B. Hood	Artillery Maj Bushrod W. Frobel	Rowan (North Carolina) Artillery: Cpt James Reilly; German (South Carolina) Artillery: Cpt William K. Bachman; Palmetto (South Carolina) Artillery: Cpt Hugh R. Garden
Kemper's Division; BG James L. Kemper	Kemper's Brigade Col Montgomery D. Corse (w); Col William R. Terry	1st Virginia: Ltc Frederick G. Skinner (w); 7th Virginia: Col Waller T. Patton (w); 11th Virginia: Maj Adam Clement; 17th Virginia: Ltc Morton Marye (w), Maj Arthur Herbert; 24th Virginia: Col William R. Terry
Kemper's Division; BG James L. Kemper	Jenkins' Brigade BG Micah Jenkins (w); Col Joseph Walker	1st South Carolina: Col Thomas J. Glover (k); 2nd South Carolina (Rifles); 5th South Carolina; 6th South Carolina; 4th South Carolina Battalion; Palmetto Sharpshooters: Col Joseph Walker
Kemper's Division; BG James L. Kemper	Pickett's Brigade Col Eppa Hunton	8th Virginia: Ltc Norborne Berkeley; 18th Virginia: Maj George G. Cabell; 19th Virginia: Col John B. Strange; 28th Virginia: Col Robert C. Allen; 56th Virginia: Col William D. Stuart
Kemper's Division; BG James L. Kemper	Artillery	Fauquier (Virginia) Artillery: Cpt Robert M. Stribling; Loudoun (Virginia) Artillery: Cpt Arthur L. Rogers
Reporting directly	Evans' Brigade BG Nathan G. Evans; Col Peter F. Stevens	17th South Carolina: Col John H. Means (mw), Ltc Fitzhugh W. McMaster; 18th South Carolina: Col James M. Gadberry (k), Ltc William H. Wallace; 22nd South Carolina: Col Stephen D. Goodlett (w); 23rd South Carolina: Col Henry L. Benbow (w), Cpt Matthew V. Bancroft; Holcombe Legion: Col Peter F. Stevens, Ltc Francis G. Palmer (w), Maj William J. Crawley; Macbeth (South Carolina) Artillery: Cpt Robert Boyce
Right Wing Reserve Artillery; Col James B. Walton	Washington (Louisiana) Artillery	1st Company: Cpt Charles W. Squires; 2nd Company: Cpt John B. Richardson; 3rd Company: Cpt Merritt B. Miller; 4th Company: Cpt Benjamin F. Eshleman
Right Wing Reserve Artillery; Col James B. Walton	Miscellaneous Batteries	Turner (Virginia) Artillery; Moorman's (Virginia) Battery: Cpt Marcellus N. Moorman; Norfolk (Virginia) Artillery: Cpt Frank Huger

=== Left Wing ===
MG Thomas J. Jackson

Chief of Artillery: Col Stapleton Crutchfield

Division	Brigade	Regiments and Others
Jackson's Division; BG William B. Taliaferro (w); BG William E. Starke	Winder's Brigade Col William S. Baylor (k); Col Andrew J. Grigsby (w)	2nd Virginia: Ltc Lawson Botts (k), Cpt John W. Rowan, Cpt Raleigh T. Colston; 4th Virginia: Ltc Robert D. Gardner; 5th Virginia: Maj Hazael J. Williams; 27th Virginia: Col Andrew J. Grigsby; 33rd Virginia: Col John F. Neff (k), Cpt George Huston
Jackson's Division; BG William B. Taliaferro (w); BG William E. Starke	Jones' Brigade Col Bradley T. Johnson	21st Virginia: Cpt William A. Witcher; 42nd Virginia: Cpt John E. Penn; 48th Virginia: Lt Virginius Dabney (w), Cpt William W. Goldsborough (w); 1st Virginia Battalion: Maj John Seddon, Cpt Octavius C. Henderson
Jackson's Division; BG William B. Taliaferro (w); BG William E. Starke	Taliaferro's Brigade Col Alexander G. Taliaferro	47th Alabama: Col James W. Jackson; 48th Alabama: Col James L. Sheffield; 10th Virginia: Ltc Samuel T. Walker (w); 23rd Virginia; 37th Virginia
Jackson's Division; BG William B. Taliaferro (w); BG William E. Starke	Starke's Brigade BG William E. Starke; Col Leroy A. Stafford	1st Louisiana; 2nd Louisiana: Col Jesse M. Williams; 9th Louisiana: Col Leroy A. Stafford; 10th Louisiana: Ltc William Spencer (k); 15th Louisiana: Col Edmund Pendleton; 1st Louisiana Zouave Battalion: Ltc Georges A. G. De Coppens
Jackson's Division; BG William B. Taliaferro (w); BG William E. Starke	Artillery Maj Lindsay M. Shumaker	Baltimore (Maryland) Artillery: Cpt John B. Brockenbrough; Alleghany (Virginia) Artillery: Lt Joseph Carpenter; Danville (Virginia) Artillery: Cpt George W. Wooding; Cutshaw's (Virginia) Battery: Cpt William E. Cutshaw; Rice's (Virginia) Battery: Cpt William H. Rice; Hampden (Virginia) Artillery: Cpt William H. Caskie; Lee (Virginia) Artillery: Cpt Charles I. Raine; Rockbridge (Virginia) Artillery: Cpt William T. Poague; Winchester (Virginia) Artillery: Lt David R. Barton
A. P. Hill's Light Division; MG Ambrose P. Hill	Branch's Brigade BG Lawrence O. Branch	7th North Carolina: Cpt Robert B. MacRae; 18th North Carolina: Ltc Thomas J. Purdie; 28th North Carolina: Col James H. Lane; 33rd North Carolina: Col Robert F. Hoke; 37th North Carolina: Col William M. Barbour
A. P. Hill's Light Division; MG Ambrose P. Hill	Pender's Brigade BG William D. Pender	16th North Carolina: Cpt Leroy W. Stowe (w); 22nd North Carolina: Maj Christopher C. Cole; 34th North Carolina: Col Richard H. Riddick; 38th North Carolina: Cpt John Ashford
A. P. Hill's Light Division; MG Ambrose P. Hill	Anderson's (old) Brigade Col Edward L. Thomas	14th Georgia: Col Robert W. Folsom; 35th Georgia; 45th Georgia: Maj Washington L. Grice; 49th Georgia: Ltc Seaborn M. Manning
A. P. Hill's Light Division; MG Ambrose P. Hill	Gregg's Brigade BG Maxcy Gregg	1st South Carolina: Maj Edward McGrady Jr. (w), Cpt George W. McCreary; 1st South Carolina (Orr's Rifles): Col J. Foster Marshall (k), Ltc Daniel A. Ledbetter (k), Cpt Joseph J. Norton, Cpt George McD. Miller; 12th South Carolina: Col Dixon Barnes; 13th South Carolina: Col Oliver E. Edwards (w), Cpt David R. Duncan; 14th South Carolina: Col Samuel McGowan (w), Ltc William D. Simpson
A. P. Hill's Light Division; MG Ambrose P. Hill	Archer's Brigade BG James J. Archer	5th Alabama Battalion: Cpt Thomas Bush (k), Lt Charles M. Hooper; 19th Georgia: Cpt Frank M. Johnston; 1st Tennessee (Provisional Army): Col Peter Turney; 7th Tennessee: Maj Samuel G. Shepard; 14th Tennessee: Col William A. Forbes (mw), Maj James W. Lockert
A. P. Hill's Light Division; MG Ambrose P. Hill	Field's Brigade BG Charles W. Field (w); Col John M. Brockenbrough	40th Virginia: Col John M. Brockenbrough; 47th Virginia: Col Robert M. Mayo (w); 55th Virginia: Col Frank Mallory; 22nd Virginia Battalion
A. P. Hill's Light Division; MG Ambrose P. Hill	Artillery Ltc R. Lindsay Walker	Branch (North Carolina) Artillery: Lt John R. Potts; Pee Dee (South Carolina) Artillery: Cpt David G. McIntosh; Crenshaw's (Virginia) Battery: Cpt William G. Crenshaw; Fredericksburg (Virginia) Artillery: Cpt Carter M. Braxton; Letcher (Virginia) Artillery: Cpt Greenlee Davidson; Middlesex (Virginia) Artillery: Lt William B. Hardy; Purcell (Virginia) Artillery: Cpt William R. J. Pegram
Ewell's Division; MG Richard S. Ewell (w); BG Alexander R. Lawton	Lawton's Brigade BG Alexander R. Lawton; Col Marcellus Douglass	13th Georgia: Col Marcellus Douglass; 26th Georgia; 31st Georgia; 38th Georgia; 60th Georgia: Maj Thomas J. Berry; 61st Georgia
Ewell's Division; MG Richard S. Ewell (w); BG Alexander R. Lawton	Trimble's Brigade BG Isaac R. Trimble (w); Cpt William F. Brown (k)	15th Alabama: Maj Alexander A. Lowther; 12th Georgia: Cpt William F. Brown; 21st Georgia: Cpt Thomas C. Glover; 21st North Carolina: Ltc Sanders Fulton (k); 1st North Carolina Battalion Sharpshooter
Ewell's Division; MG Richard S. Ewell (w); BG Alexander R. Lawton	Early's Brigade BG Jubal A. Early	13th Virginia: Col James A. Walker; 25th Virginia: Col George H. Smith (w); 31st Virginia: Col John S. Hoffman; 44th Virginia; 49th Virginia: Col William Smith; 52nd Virginia; 58th Virginia: Col Samuel Letcher
Ewell's Division; MG Richard S. Ewell (w); BG Alexander R. Lawton	Hays' Brigade Col Henry Forno (w); Col Henry B. Strong	5th Louisiana: Maj Bruce Menger; 6th Louisiana: Col Henry B. Strong; 7th Louisiana; 8th Louisiana: Maj Trevanion D. Lewis; 14th Louisiana
Ewell's Division; MG Richard S. Ewell (w); BG Alexander R. Lawton	Artillery	Louisiana Guard Battery: Cpt Louis E. D'Aquin; 1st Maryland Battery: Cpt William F. Dement; Chesapeake (Maryland) Artillery: Cpt William D. Brown; Johnson's (Virginia) Battery: Cpt John R. Johnson; Courtney (Virginia) Artillery: Cpt Joseph W. Latimer; Staunton (Virginia) Artillery: Lt Asher W. Garber

=== Cavalry ===
Division	Brigade	Regiments and Others
Stuart's Division; MG James E. B. Stuart	Robertson's Brigade BG Beverly Robertson	2nd Virginia: Col Thomas T. Munford (w); 6th Virginia: Col Thomas S. Flournoy; 7th Virginia: Col William E. Jones, Cpt Samuel B. Myers; 12th Virginia: Col Asher W. Harman; 17th Virginia Battalion: Maj William Patrick (mw)
Stuart's Division; MG James E. B. Stuart	Lee's Brigade BG Fitzhugh Lee	1st Virginia: Col L. Tiernan Brien; 4th Virginia: Col Williams C. Wickham; 5th Virginia: Col Thomas L. Rosser; 9th Virginia: Col William H. F. Lee
Stuart's Division; MG James E. B. Stuart	Horse Artillery	Virginia Battery (Stuart Horse Artillery): Cpt John Pelham
