= 5th Texas Infantry Regiment =

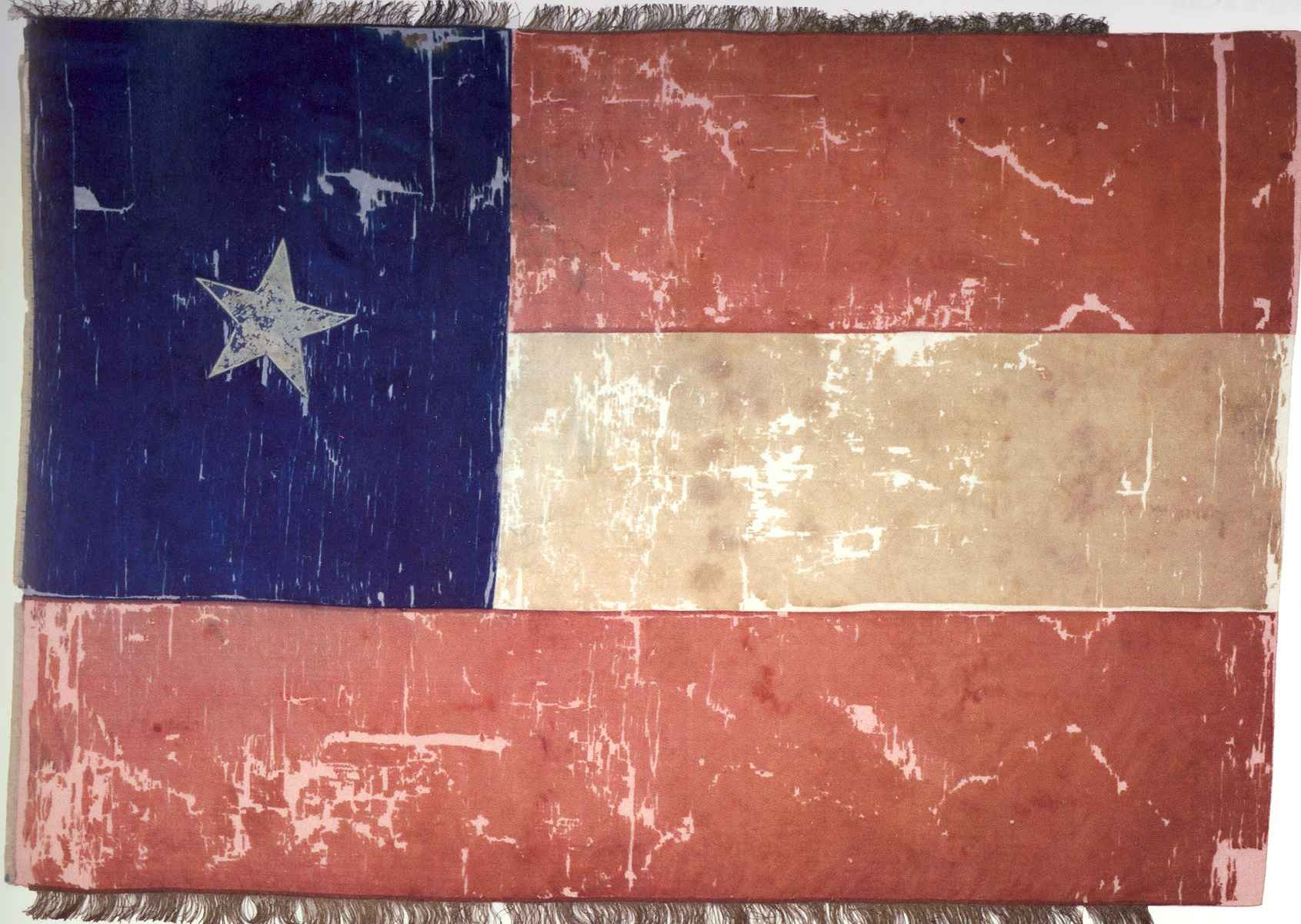
- Regimental flag of the Fifth Texas Infantry
- Active: 30 September 1861 – 9 April 1865
- Country: Confederate States of America
- Allegiance: Confederate States of America, Texas
- Branch: Confederate States Army
- Type: Infantry
- Size: Regiment
- Nickname: Archer's Regiment
- Engagements: American Civil War; Battle of Eltham's Landing (1862); Battle of Seven Pines (1862); Battle of Gaines's Mill (1862); Second Battle of Bull Run (1862); Battle of South Mountain (1862); Battle of Antietam (1862); Battle of Fredericksburg (1862); Battle of Gettysburg (1863); Battle of Chickamauga (1863); Battle of the Wilderness (1864); Battle of Spotsylvania (1864); Battle of Cold Harbor (1864); Siege of Petersburg (1864–65); Battle of Appomattox (1865)

Commanders
- Notable commanders: James J. Archer; Jerome B. Robertson

The 5th Texas Infantry Regiment was a unit of Confederate States Army infantry volunteers created in 1861 that fought in the Army of Northern Virginia during the American Civil War. The unit was part of the famous Texas Brigade. The regiment fought at Eltham's Landing, Seven Pines, Gaines's Mill, Second Bull Run, South Mountain, Antietam, and Fredericksburg in 1862. It fought at Gettysburg and Chickamauga in 1863 and the Wilderness, Spotsylvania, Cold Harbor, and the Siege of Petersburg in 1864. The regiment surrendered to Federal forces on 9 April 1865 after the Battle of Appomattox Court House.

== History ==
=== Formation ===
The Confederate War Department created the 5th Texas Infantry Regiment in October 1861. Colonel James J. Archer was the unit's first commanding officer. The regiment was assigned to the Texas Brigade. Soldiers were recruited from Colorado, Harris, Jefferson, Leon, Liberty, Milam, Montgomery, Polk, Trinity, Walker, and Washington County, Texas. Companies were organized as shown in the table below.

Original Company Organization of the 5th Texas Infantry Regiment
Company	Nickname
A	Bayou City Guards
B	?
C	Leon Hunters
D	Waverly Confederates
E	Dixie Blues
F	Invincibles
G	Milam County Greys
H	Texas Polk Rifles
I	Texas Aides
K	Polk County Flying Artillery

=== 1861–1862 ===
On 7 May 1862, Confederate army commander Joseph E. Johnston ordered John Bell Hood and his Texas brigade to "feel the enemy and gently fall back". The Battle of Eltham's Landing occurred when the Texas brigade bumped into William B. Franklin's Federal troops. With other units of William H.C. Whiting's division in support, Hood's Texans drove their foes back more than a mile. The Confederates inflicted 186 casualties on the Union troops while sustaining only 48 casualties. Later, Johnston asked Hood what the Texans would have done if he had ordered them to charge and drive back the enemy. Hood replied, "I suppose General, they would have driven them into the river, and tried to swim out and capture the gunboats".

James J. Archer

At the Battle of Seven Pines on 31 May–1 June, the Texas Brigade was only lightly engaged, losing a total of 13 wounded. Colonel Archer led the 5th Texas in the action. The Texas Brigade arrived late on the field during the Battle of Gaines's Mill, but played an important part. At this time, the Texas Brigade included the 1st Texas, 4th Texas, 5th Texas, and 18th Georgia Regiments and Hampton's Legion. Before the 7:00 pm attack, Confederate army commander Robert E. Lee asked Hood, "This must be done. Can you break the line?" The Texas Brigade commander replied, "I will try". Charging at the run, Hood's brigade stampeded the Federal first line and its flight carried away the second line also. The Texas Brigade was one of several units that could claim to have been the first to crack the Union front that day. The brigade lost perhaps one man in four during the successful but costly charge. During the Seven Days Battles, Hood's brigade lost 92 killed, 526 wounded, and five missing. On 5 June 1862, Archer received promotion to brigadier general in a Tennessee brigade. Jerome B. Robertson replaced Archer as colonel commanding the 5th Texas.

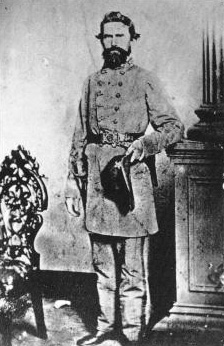
Jerome B. Robertson

The 5th Texas fought in the Second Battle of Bull Run on 28–30 August 1862. On the evening of the 29th, the brigades of Evander M. Law and Hood mounted a reconnaissance in force in which they defeated two Union brigades under John Porter Hatch. Because of the darkness and confusion, Hood's and Law's men were withdrawn to their original positions. The next day at 4:00 pm, James Longstreet and Lee launched a major assault at the Union left flank; it was led by the Texas Brigade. The 1st Texas on the extreme left drifted off and lost touch with the brigade. So the attack was made with the 4th Texas on the left, the 5th Texas on the right, and the 18th Georgia and Hampton's Legion in the center. Hood's brigade smashed Gouverneur K. Warren's 1,000-man brigade. Next, Martin Davis Hardin's Federal brigade tried to block the Texas Brigade's advance. The 5th Texas turned Hardin's left flank and forced the Union brigade to flee. The 4th Texas and 18th Georgia overran a Union artillery battery. Next, Hood's brigade encountered Nathaniel McLean's Union brigade atop Chinn Ridge. At this time, the 4th Texas came under blistering fire and pulled out of the fight while the 5th Texas and the other units took cover in some woods. Nathan George Evans's brigade caught up with Hood's Texans, but their attack was repulsed. A further advance by the 5th Texas was stopped cold. It would take several more Confederate brigades to drive McLean's Federals from their position. The Texas Brigade lost 75 killed, 550 wounded, and 13 missing at Second Bull Run. The 5th Texas suffered 225 casualties in the battle, more than any other Confederate regiment.

The Texas Brigade fought near Fox's Gap during the Battle of South Mountain on 14 September. The Battle of Antietam was fought on 17 September, but on the previous evening Hood's division clashed with Federal troops before being pulled back into reserve. At 7:00 am next morning, after the initial Union attack broke through the Confederate first line, the 2,300 men of Hood's division were thrown into the battle. The division consisted of Law's brigade and the Texas Brigade under the command of William T. Wofford. The 5th Texas advanced to the right into the East Wood along with the 4th Alabama. The 1st Texas charged north into the Miller cornfield where it was nearly wiped out. The 4th Texas defended a fence line facing west and also suffered serious losses. Later, Hood was asked where his division was and he replied, "Dead on the field". The 5th Texas lost 4 killed and 62 wounded out of 175 men taken into battle.

=== 1862–1865 ===
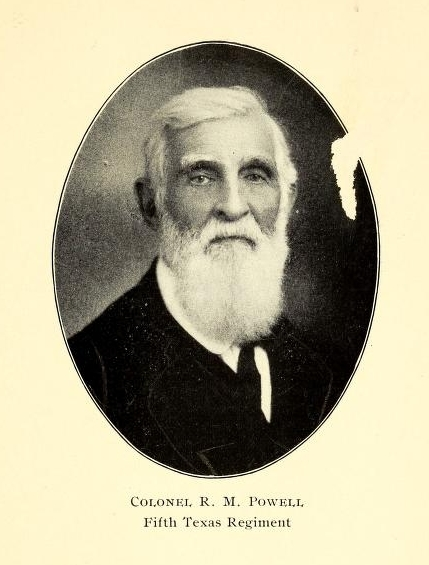
Robert M. Powell

After Antietam, Hood was promoted major general and Robertson took command of the Texas Brigade. Robert M. Powell replaced Robertson as commander of the 5th Texas. Before the Battle of Fredericksburg on 13 December 1862, the Texas Brigade reorganized so that it consisted of the 1st, 4th, and 5th Texas, and the 3rd Arkansas Infantry Regiments. At the same time, Hood's division expanded in size from two to four brigades. The brigade was lightly engaged at Fredericksburg, losing only one killed and four wounded.

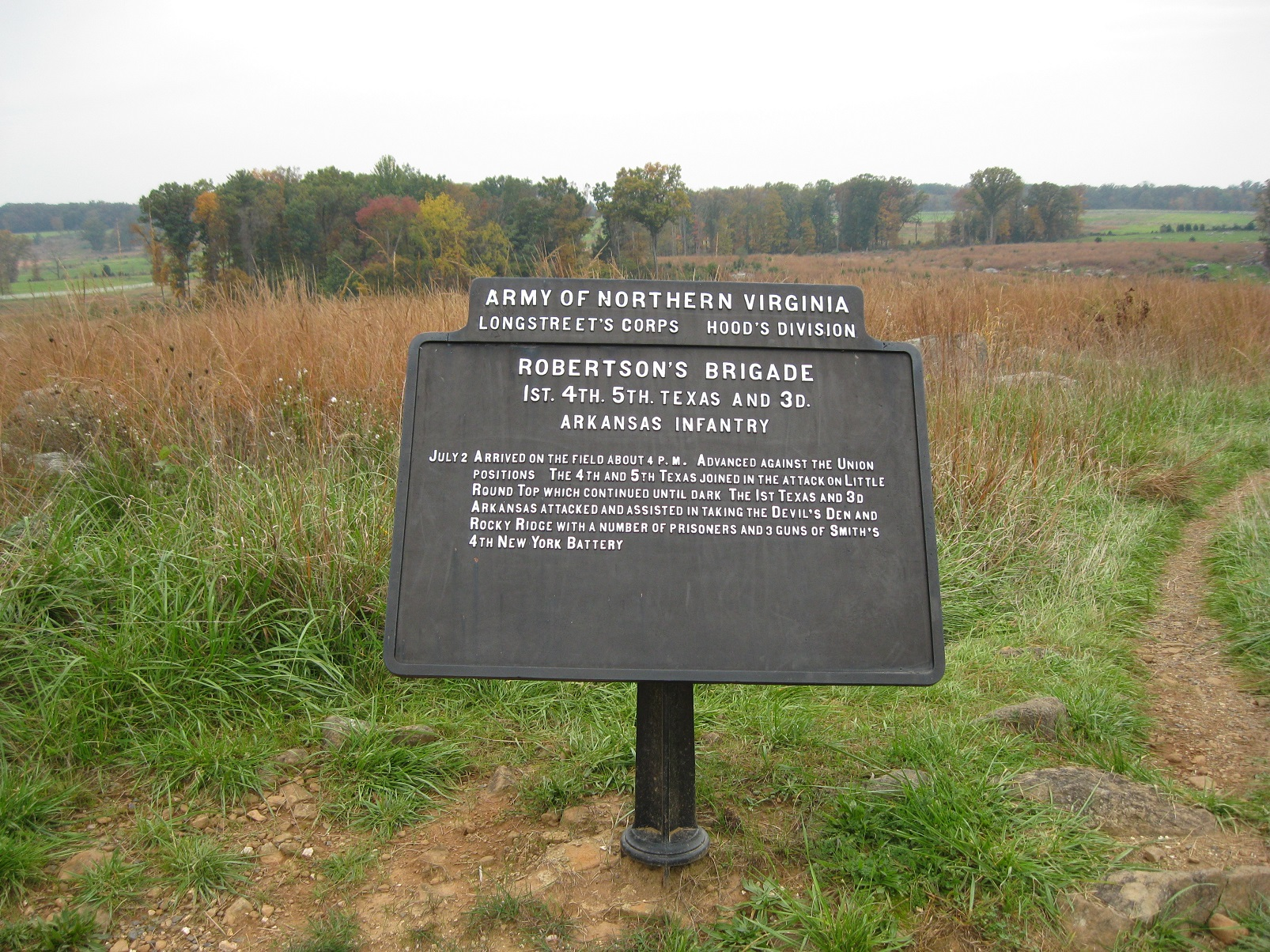
Robertson's Brigade marker at Gettysburg National Military Park shows where its attack was launched.

The 5th Texas was heavily engaged on 2 July 1863 at the Battle of Gettysburg where more than half of its 409 men became casualties. At Gettysburg, Robertson's Texas Brigade deployed on the left of Law's brigade in Hood's first line. Shortly after the attack started, a bursting shell seriously wounded Hood, leaving his division without his guiding hand. Meanwhile, the regiments in the Texas Brigade accidentally became separated. The 3rd Arkansas and 1st Texas on the left moved toward Devil's Den while the 4th and 5th Texas on the right marched toward Little Round Top. Together with the 4th Alabama, the 4th and 5th Texas attacked Little Round Top, but were repulsed by the Federal troops posted there. Some of the Texans got so close to the Federal lines that they were captured when the rest of their regiments retreated. Private William A. Fletcher of the 5th Texas admitted that, after the first attack, he and other troops bolted as soon as they entered the zone of heavy fire where his comrades lay dead or wounded. Later, through a blunder, part of a Union regiment withdrew. But before the Texas and Alabama soldiers could exploit the gap, General Warren plugged it with the 140th New York Regiment and the Confederates were forced to retreat. One soldier of the 5th Texas recalled bitterly that Little Round Top would have been impregnable even if the Federals had been armed with rocks. At Gettysburg, Robertson's brigade sustained losses of 84 killed, 393 wounded, and 120 missing, a total of 597 casualties.

The Texas Brigade shifted to the Western theater with Longstreet's corps where it fought at the Battle of Chickamauga on 19–20 September 1863. Robertson's Texas Brigade was heavily engaged on the first day. From left to right, the regiments were the 3rd Arkansas, 1st, 4th and 5th Texas. Robertson's brigade drove the opposing Union troops back to the Viniard House on the Lafayette Road. When they tried to advance farther they were stopped by John T. Wilder's Union brigade armed with Spencer repeating rifles. After severe fighting, Robertson finally pulled his brigade back to a ridge to the east of the road. On the second day, the Texas Brigade was part of the assault column that drove through a gap and routed the Union right wing. After the breakthrough, Robertson's brigade veered to the northeast across the Dyer Field toward a Union battery. Without warning, it was struck by Charles Garrison Harker's Union brigade which appeared out of the forest and blasted the 4th Texas on the brigade's right flank. Longstreet's brigades had just been issued with brand-new blue jackets - a poor choice of color. While the 4th Texas scattered to the rear, another Confederate brigade mistakenly started firing at Robertson's men from a different direction. Harker's Union troops then moved forward and fired on the 5th Texas, which had fallen behind and was dashing to catch up with the brigade. The 5th Texas turned to face the threat, but it was forced to retreat with the rest of Robertson's brigade. At Chickamauga, the Texas Brigade lost 78 killed, 457 wounded, and 35 missing, a total of 570 casualties.

The 5th Texas was present but not engaged at the Battle of Wauhatchie on the night of 28–29 October 1863. While the other three regiments of Robertson's brigade took part in the fighting, the 5th Texas guarded a bridge in the rear. Longstreet's corps was involved in the Siege of Knoxville before returning to Virginia after January 1864. During the operations around Knoxville, Robertson's brigade lost nine killed, 18 wounded, and six missing. Colonel Powell led the 5th Texas.

The Texas Brigade led by John Gregg fought in the Battle of the Wilderness on 5–7 May 1864. The brigade was part of Charles W. Field's division in Longstreet's Corps and Lieutenant Colonel King Bryan commanded the 5th Texas. On the second day, the II Corps broke through the Confederate front just as Longstreet's corps arrived on the battlefield. General Lee attempted to lead the counterattack, but the men of the Texas Brigade shouted, "We won't go on unless you go back". Gregg's 800-strong brigade blunted the Union advance, but half of the men became casualties. The regiment fought at the Battle of Spottsylvania Court House on 8–21 May and at other battles of the Overland Campaign including the Battle of Cold Harbor in early June. The Texas Brigade commanded by Colonel F. S. Bass fought in the Siege of Petersburg through the end of 1864. By that time Colonel Powell had returned to lead the 5th Texas. After the Battle of Appomattox Court House, Lee's army surrendered on 9 April 1865. On that date, the 5th Texas counted 12 officers and 149 rank and file, the largest unit of the Texas Brigade.

== See also ==
- List of Texas Civil War Confederate units
- Texas in the American Civil War
