= 4th Texas Infantry Regiment =

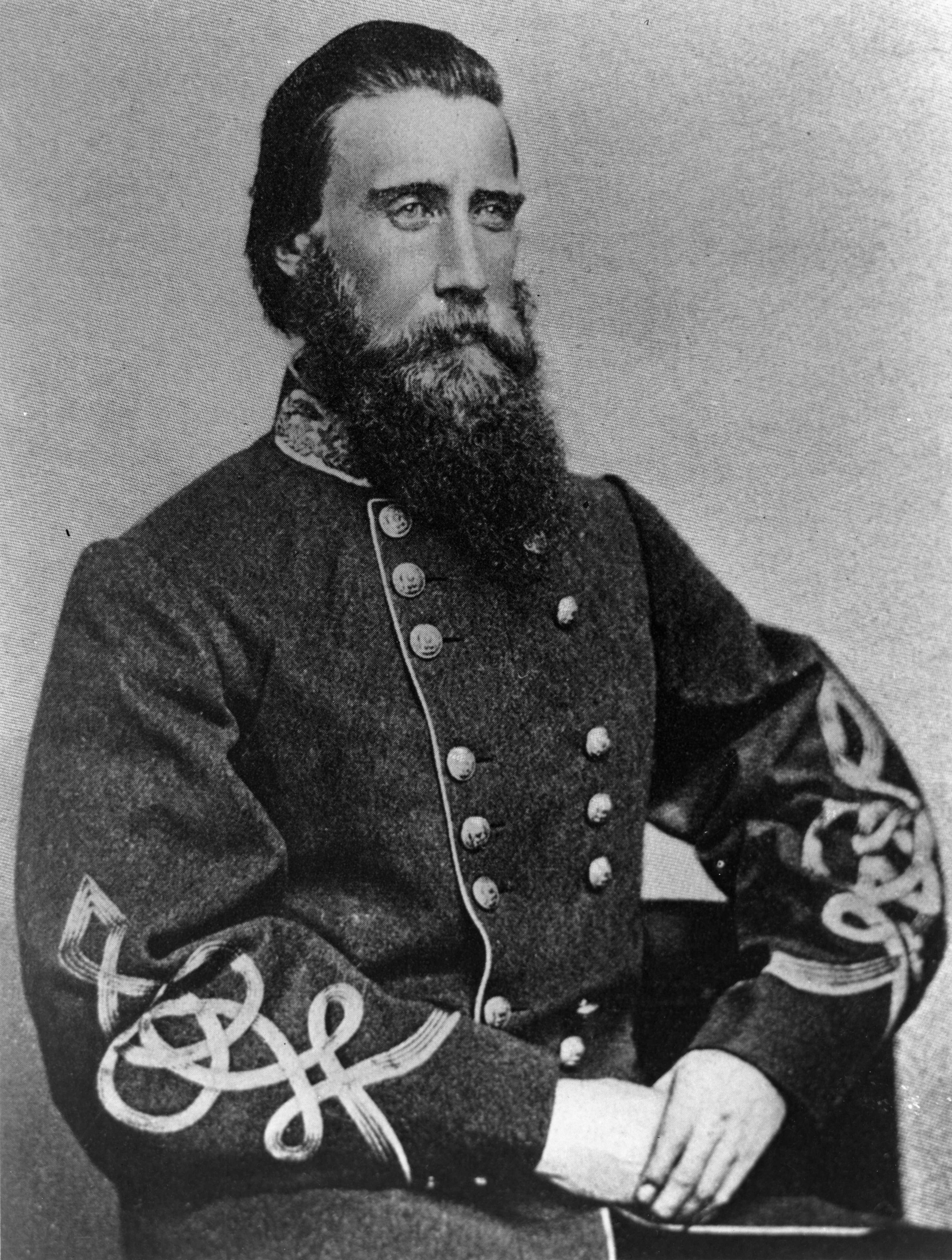
- John Bell Hood was the most famous commanding officer of the 4th Texas Infantry Regiment.
- Active: 30 September 1861 – 9 April 1865
- Country: Confederate States of America
- Allegiance: Confederate States of America, Texas
- Branch: Confederate States Army
- Type: Infantry
- Size: Regiment
- Nickname: Hood's Regiment
- Engagements: American Civil War; Battle of Eltham's Landing (1862); Battle of Seven Pines (1862); Battle of Gaines's Mill (1862); Second Battle of Bull Run (1862); Battle of South Mountain (1862); Battle of Antietam (1862); Battle of Fredericksburg (1862); Battle of Gettysburg (1863); Battle of Chickamauga (1863); Battle of Wauhatchie (1863); Battle of the Wilderness (1864); Battle of Spotsylvania (1864); Battle of Cold Harbor (1864); Siege of Petersburg (1864–65); Battle of Appomattox (1865)

Commanders
- Notable commanders: John Bell Hood

The 4th Texas Infantry Regiment was a unit of Confederate States Army infantry volunteers that was created in 1861 and fought in the Army of Northern Virginia during the American Civil War. As part of the famous Texas Brigade, the regiment fought at Eltham's Landing, Seven Pines, Gaines's Mill, Second Bull Run, South Mountain, Antietam, and Fredericksburg in 1862. It fought at Suffolk, Gettysburg, Chickamauga and Wauhatchie in 1863 and the Wilderness, Spotsylvania, Cold Harbor, and the Siege of Petersburg in 1864. The regiment surrendered to Federal forces on 9 April 1865 after the Battle of Appomattox Court House.

== History ==
=== Formation ===
In 1861, Governor Edward Clark set up a camp of instruction along the San Marcos River in Hays County. The first units that later became the 4th Texas Infantry enlisted there in April. At first, the term of enlistment was one year, but after the Battle of Fort Sumter on 12 April, the state authorities insisted that units must serve for the duration of the war. In July, 20 infantry companies marched to Harrisburg before being sent to Virginia. On 30 September 1861, a total of 1,187 men in ten companies were organized into the 4th Texas Infantry Regiment (see table below). In a departure from tradition, the soldiers were not allowed to elect their field officers. Instead, the Confederate War Department appointed Robert T. P. Allen, the ex-superintendent of Bastrop Academy as colonel. Allen soon became very unpopular because of his harsh discipline and resigned in October. He was replaced as colonel by John Bell Hood. John F. Marshall, editor of the Texas State Gazette, became lieutenant colonel and Bradfute Warwick, a Virginian, became major.

Recruitment Areas of the 4th Texas Infantry Regiment
Company	Nickname	Recruitment Area
A	Hardeman Rifles	Gonzales County
B	Tom Green Rifles	Travis County
C	Robertson Five Shooters	Robertson County
D	Guadalupe Rangers	Guadalupe County
E	Lone Star Guards	McLennan County
F	Mustang Greys	Bexar County
G	Grimes County Greys	Grimes County
H	Porter Guards	Walker County
I	Navarro Rifles	Navarro County
K	Sandy Point Mounted Rifles	Henderson County

=== 1861–1862 ===
The 4th Texas became part of the Texas Brigade under the command of Louis Wigfall. The brigade moved to Dumfries, Virginia in November 1861 and spent the winter drilling. At this time, hundreds of the soldiers fell sick, which was a common occurrence in newly formed Civil War era military units. In March 1862, Hood was promoted to command the Texas brigade. Marshall became colonel and Captain J. C. G. Key of Company A was promoted major. The regiment's first combat was the Battle of Eltham's Landing on 7 May 1862. Army commander Joseph E. Johnston ordered the Texas Brigade to "feel the enemy gently and fall back". Hood wished to prevent friendly fire accidents, so he ordered the troops to advance with unloaded weapons through thick woods. Suddenly, the Texans stumbled onto an enemy patrol and a Union soldier raised his rifle to shoot Hood. John Deal, a private in the 4th Texas, shot the Federal. Luckily for Hood, Deal had ignored orders and loaded his weapon. In the skirmish, Hood's brigade drove the Union soldiers back one mile and inflicted 186 casualties for the loss of only 48 Texans.

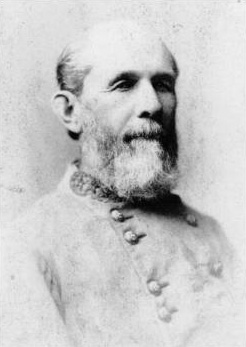
William T. Wofford

The Texas Brigade was lightly engaged at the Battle of Seven Pines on 31 May–1 June, losing only 13 men wounded. The Texas Brigade consisted of the 1st Texas, 4th Texas, 5th Texas, and 18th Georgia Regiments and Hampton's Legion. During the Seven Days Battles, the brigade's losses were 92 killed, 526 wounded, and five missing. The Texas Brigade arrived late in the day during the Battle of Gaines's Mill. Just before 7:00 pm, Confederate army commander Robert E. Lee asked Hood, "This must be done. Can you break the line?" The Texas Brigade commander answered, "I will try". Hood split his brigade into two wings and placed them on either side of Evander M. Law's brigade. Hood dismounted and marched to the assault with the 4th Texas. The Texas Brigade broke the Union first line and its flight carried away the second line also. The Texas Brigade was one of the few units that claimed to have been the first to crack the Union line that day. Law's and Hood's brigades lost 1,018 casualties during the successful charge. The 4th Texas took 500 men into battle and sustained losses of 21 killed, 63 wounded, and one captured. Marshall and Warwick were killed and Key was wounded. Another source stated that there were 253 casualties in the 4th Texas at Gaines's Mill, roughly half the regiment.

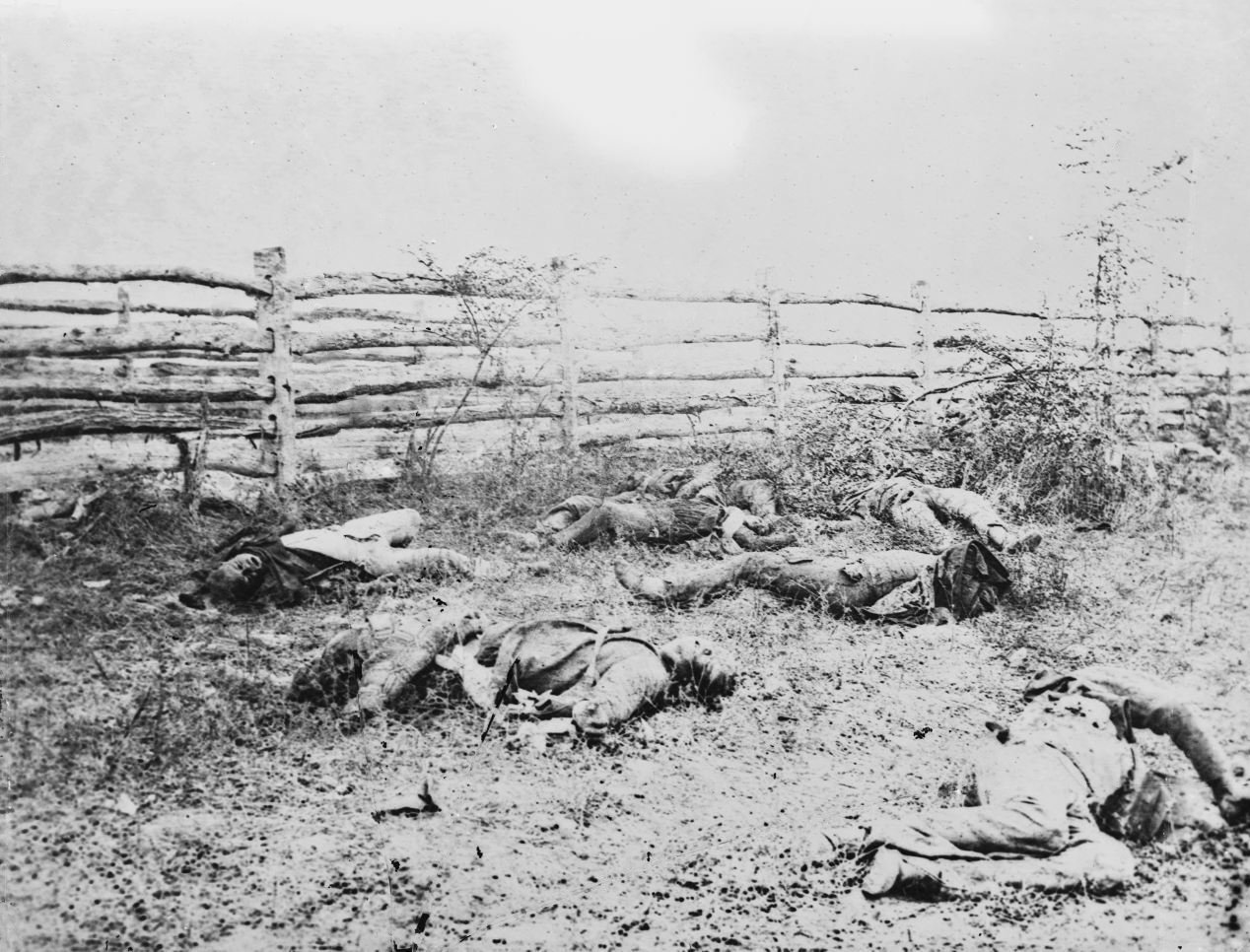
Dead Confederate soldiers lying near the Hagerstown Road on the Antietam battlefield.

The 4th Texas fought at the Second Battle of Bull Run on 28–30 August 1862. On the evening of the 29th, the brigades of Law and Hood staged a reconnaissance in force in which they drove back two Union brigades under John Porter Hatch. Because of the darkness, Hood's and Law's men were soon withdrawn to their original positions. The next day at 4:00 pm, Lee and James Longstreet mounted a major attack on the Union left flank. The Texas Brigade led the assault. The 1st Texas on the extreme left lost touch with the brigade. Therefore, the attack was made with the 4th Texas on the left, the 5th Texas on the right, and the 18th Georgia and Hampton's Legion in the center. Hood's brigade quickly smashed Gouverneur K. Warren's 1,000-man brigade. Next, Martin Davis Hardin's Union brigade tried to stop the Texas Brigade's advance but it was beaten. The 4th Texas and 18th Georgia captured a Union artillery battery. Next, Hood's brigade came up against Nathaniel McLean's Federal brigade atop Chinn Ridge. At this time, the 4th Texas came under withering fire, so Lieutenant Colonel B. F. Carter withdrew the regiment behind a ridge where it found the wayward 1st Texas. The 5th Texas and the other units took cover in some woods. Nathan George Evans's brigade caught up with Hood's Texans, but their joint attack on McLean's Federals was repelled. It would take several more Confederate brigades to defeat McLean's brigade. The Texas Brigade lost 75 killed, 550 wounded, and 13 missing at Second Bull Run. The 4th Texas had 11 killed and 20 wounded.

The 4th Texas was at the Battle of South Mountain on 14 September 1862 where it lost six killed and two wounded. At the Battle of Antietam on 17 September the regiment suffered its worst losses of the war, losing 57 killed, 130 wounded, and 23 captured, a total of 210 casualties. Another source listed 11 killed and 110 wounded, a total of 121. The Texas Brigade was led by William T. Wofford since Hood was appointed to lead the division. The 4th Texas participated in a skirmish the evening before Antietam. At 7:00 am the following day, after the initial Union attack broke through the Confederate first line, the 2,300 men of Hood's division charged into the battle. The division consisted of Law's brigade and the Texas Brigade under the command of William T. Wofford. The 5th Texas advanced to the right into the East Wood along with the 4th Alabama. The rest of Hood's division charged into the Miller cornfield, throwing back the Federal units there. The 1st Texas rushed to the northern edge of the cornfield where it confronted a fresh Union battle line and was nearly destroyed. The 4th Texas swung left to defend a fence line against Federals attacking from the west, and also suffered terrible losses. Later, Hood was asked where his division was and he answered, "Dead on the field".

=== 1862–1865 ===
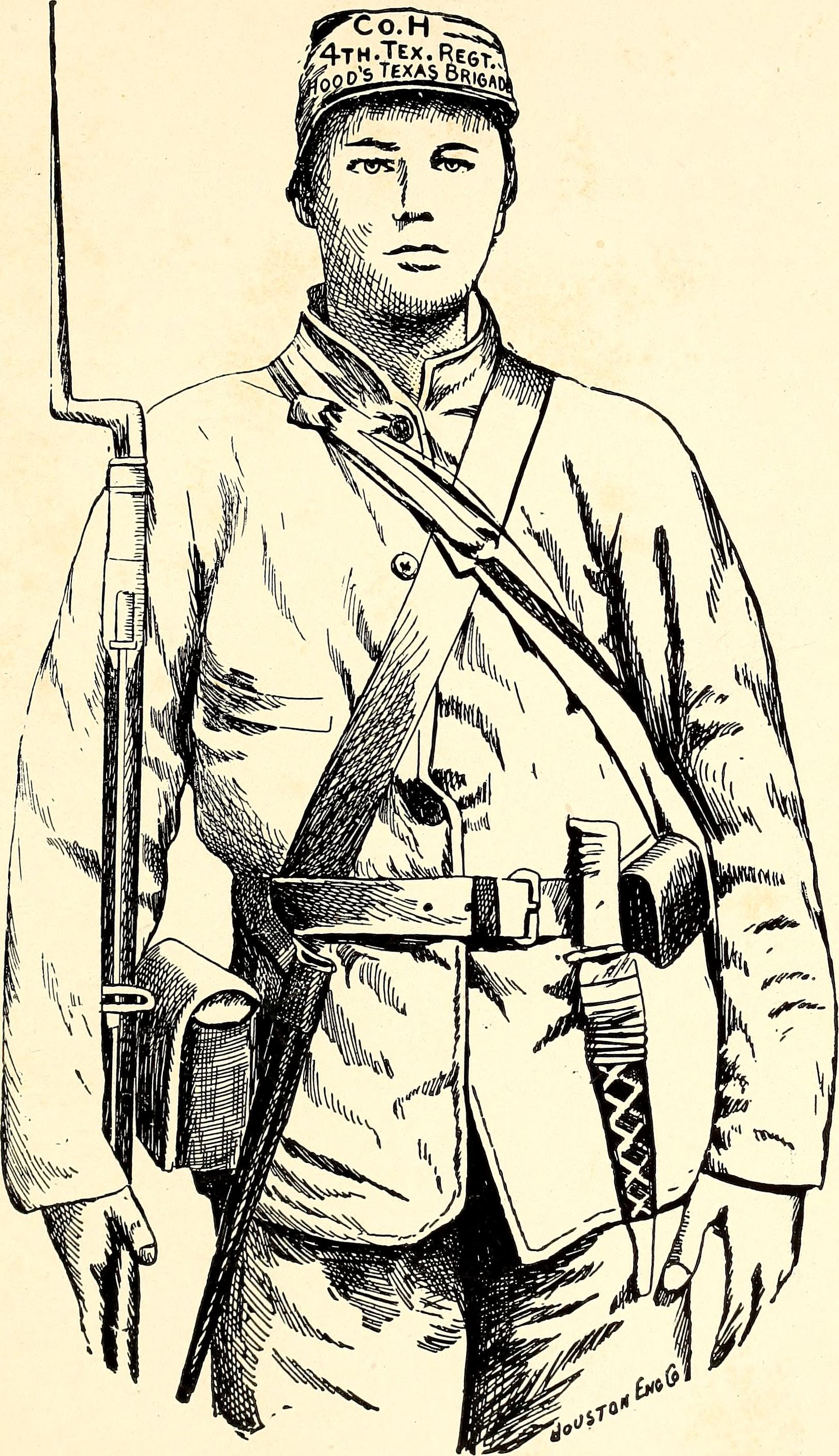
Frank Bowden Chilton, Company H, 4th Texas Inf.

Before the Battle of Fredericksburg on 13 December, the Texas Brigade underwent a reorganization, so that it included the 1st, 4th, and 5th Texas, and the 3rd Arkansas Infantry Regiments. The brigade was lightly engaged in the battle, losing only one killed and four wounded. At the same time, Hood's division was expanded from two to four brigades. The Texas Brigade missed the Battle of Chancellorsville in May 1863.

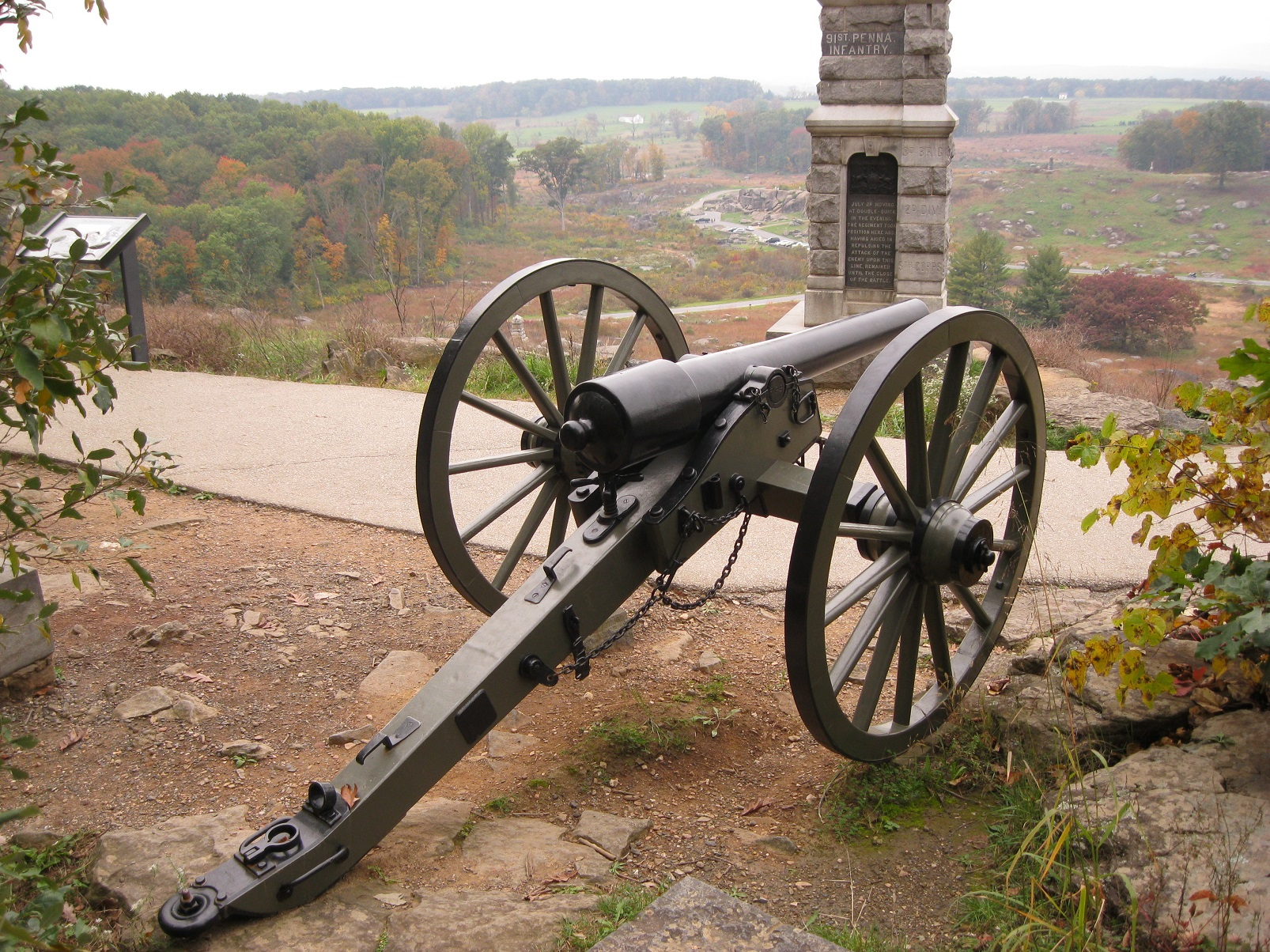
Coming from the left-center of the photo, the 4th Texas attacked Union troops defending Little Round Top at Gettysburg.

The 4th Texas was heavily engaged on 2 July 1863 at the Battle of Gettysburg where it lost 25 killed, 57 wounded, and 58 captured. Lieutenant Colonel Carter was fatally wounded. At Gettysburg, the Texas Brigade was led by Jerome B. Robertson and was placed on the left of Law's brigade in Hood's first line. A member of the 4th Texas recorded that the Texas Brigade suffered casualties during the preliminary artillery bombardment. Soon after the attack started, Hood was badly wounded by a bursting shell, leaving his brigades to fight without his guiding hand. Meanwhile, the regiments in the Texas Brigade became separated. The 3rd Arkansas and 1st Texas on the left headed for Devil's Den while the 4th and 5th Texas on the right advanced toward Little Round Top. Together with the 4th Alabama, the 4th and 5th Texas attacked Little Round Top, but were driven back by the Union troops posted there. Some of the Texans got so close to the Federal lines that they were captured when the rest of their regiments fell back. Later, through a mistaken order, part of a Union regiment retreated. But before the blunder could be fully exploited by the Texans and Alabamians, General Warren plugged the gap with the 140th New York Regiment and the Confederates were forced back again.

The Texas Brigade transferred to the Western theater with Longstreet's corps where it fought at the Battle of Chickamauga on 19–20 September 1863. Lieutenant Colonel John P. Bane led the 4th Texas during the battle. The Texas Brigade under Robertson was heavily engaged on the first day. From left to right, the regiments were the 3rd Arkansas, 1st, 4th and 5th Texas. Robertson's brigade drove the opposing Federal troops back to the Viniard House along the Lafayette Road. Attempts to press farther were stopped by artillery and John T. Wilder's Union brigade armed with Spencer repeating rifles. After bitter fighting, Robertson finally withdrew his brigade to a ridge to the east of the road. On the second day, the Texas Brigade was part of the assault column that burst through a gap and routed the Union right wing. Robertson's brigade veered to the northeast across the Dyer Field in an attempt to capture a Union battery. Suddenly it was struck by Charles Garrison Harker's Union brigade that appeared out of the forest and opened fire on the 4th Texas on the brigade's right flank. "That was the meanest, most unsatisfactory place I struck during the whole war", recalled Sergeant Val Giles. Longstreet's brigades had just been issued with brand-new blue jackets - an unfortunate choice of color. As the 4th Texas went to the rear, another Confederate brigade mistakenly started shooting at Robertson's men from another direction. The Union troops advanced and also blasted the 5th Texas, which had fallen behind and was trying to catch up. The result was that Robertson's brigade was compelled to retreat.

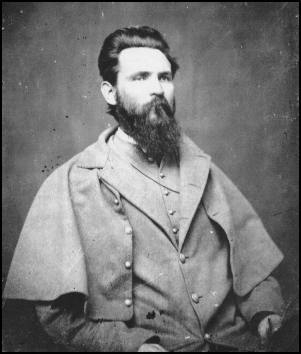
John Gregg

The 4th Texas fought at the Battle of Wauhatchie on the night of 28–29 October 1863. Law's brigade occupied a wooded hill near a road that the Federals used for their supply line. Law borrowed the Texas Brigade to strengthen his defense line, putting the 1st Texas and 3rd Arkansas on his left flank, the 4th Texas on his right, and the 5th Texas guarding a bridge in the rear. The 2,000 Confederates in this line were attacked by Orland Smith's Union brigade, only 700 strong. The first Federal attack was easily repelled but the Union troops returned to the assault. At this time, Law received intelligence that the overall operation failed; he ordered a retreat, but neglected to inform the 4th Texas. Abandoned in the darkness, and confronted by Federals converging on their position, the 4th Texas suddenly panicked and fled. Sergeant J. M. Polley wrote, "the officers and privates of the heretofore invincible 4th Texas stood not upon the order of their going, but ... stampeded and plunged into the shadowy depths behind them. This was the only time the regiment was routed during the war. Longstreet's corps returned to Virginia in April 1864.

Under the command of John Gregg, the Texas Brigade fought in the Battle of the Wilderness on 5–7 May 1864. It formed part of Charles W. Field's division in Longstreet's Corps and Bane was still the commander of the 4th Texas. On the second day, the II Corps broke the Confederate line just as Longstreet's corps reached the battlefield. When General Lee tried to lead the counterattack, the Texas Brigade refused to advance until their army commander went to the rear. The 800 men of Gregg's brigade stopped the Union advance, but half of the men became casualties. The 4th Texas lost 26 killed, 95 wounded, and three captured out of 207 men in the Wilderness. The regiment was lightly engaged at the Battle of Spottsylvania Court House on 8–21 May and also fought at other battles of the Overland Campaign including the Battle of Cold Harbor in early June. The Texas Brigade fought in the Siege of Petersburg and at the end of 1864, it was commanded by Colonel F. S. Bass while Bane still led the 4th Texas.

On 9 April 1865, the 4th Texas had only 15 officers and 143 men when Lee's army surrendered after the Battle of Appomattox Court House. During the war 1,343 soldiers served in the 4th Texas Infantry Regiment. There were 256 killed, 486 wounded (some more than once), 162 captured, 161 died of disease, 251 discharged for illness and other causes, and 51 deserted.

== See also ==
- List of Texas Civil War Confederate units
