= Battle of Bull Run order of battle =

Battle of Bull Run order of battle may refer to:

- First Battle of Bull Run order of battle
- Second Battle of Bull Run order of battle

== See also ==
- Battle of Bull Run (disambiguation)
