= 1st Texas Infantry Regiment =

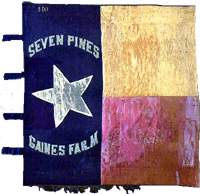
- 1st Texas Infantry Regiment flag
- Active: August 1861 – April 1865
- Country: Confederate States of America
- Allegiance: Army of Northern Virginia
- Branch: Confederate States Army
- Type: Regiment
- Role: Infantry
- Nickname: Ragged Old First
- Engagements: American Civil War: Battle of Eltham's Landing; Seven Days' Battles; First Battle of Rappahannock Station; Second Battle of Bull Run; Battle of South Mountain; Battle of Antietam; Battle of Fredericksburg; Siege of Suffolk; Battle of Gettysburg; Chickamauga Campaign; Battle of Wauhatchie; Knoxville Campaign; Battle of the Wilderness; Battle of Spotsylvania Court House; Battle of North Anna; Battle of Cold Harbor; Siege of Petersburg; Appomattox Campaign

The 1st Texas Infantry Regiment, nicknamed the "Ragged Old First," was an infantry regiment raised in Texas for service in the Confederate States Army during the American Civil War. It fought mostly with the Army of Northern Virginia.

The 1st Texas Infantry Regiment was assembled at Richmond, Virginia, in August, 1861, with ten companies from Marion, Cass, Polk, Houston, Harrison, Tyler, Anderson, Cherokee, Sabine, San Augustine, Newton, and Nacogdoches counties. Later two companies from Galveston and Trinity County were added to the command. Part of Hood's Texas Brigade, it served under Generals Hood, J.B. Robertson, and John Gregg. The regiment fought with the Army of Northern Virginia from Seven Pines to Cold Harbor except when it was detached with Longstreet at Suffolk, Chickamauga, and Knoxville. It was involved in the Petersburg siege north and south of the James River and later the Appomattox Campaign. This unit had 477 effectives in April, 1862 and lost 186 of the 226 engaged at Sharpsburg, a casualty rate of 82.3% percent. This staggering casualty rate was the highest suffered by any regiment, North or South, on a single day, during the entire war. In incurring these losses during ferocious fighting in Miller's cornfield the regiment lost a battle flag which was picked up by federal troops when they re-occupied the cornfield (the First Texas having previously withdrawn without noticing the loss of their flag).

The highest number of casualties, on the other hand, was suffered by the 26th North Carolina Infantry at the Battle of Gettysburg. They suffered 72% casualties out of the 820 engaged. The 1st Texas suffered more than twenty percent of the 426 during the same engagement. It surrendered with 16 officers and 133 men. The field officers were Colonels Frederick S. Bass, Hugh McLeod, Alexis T. Rainey, and Louis T. Wigfall; Lieutenant Colonels Harvey H. Black, Albert G. Clopton, R.J. Harding, and P.A. Work; and Majors Matt. Dale and John R. Woodward.

The 1st Texas also lost a battle flag on April 8, 1865, at Appomattox Court House when it was captured by 1st Lt. Morton A. Read of the 8th New York Cavalry. Read earned the Medal of Honor for this deed.

== Formation ==
After the Battle of Fort Sumter on April 12, 1861, by Confederate Forces under General P. G. T. Beauregard in Charleston, South Carolina. Militia companies started to be raised across the state of Texas. Initially, the Confederate Government wanted the Texas forces to stay to provide defenses for the state, but 10 companies marched off to Richmond without the authorization to do so. These companies constituted the nucleus that became the 1st Texas Infantry Regiment.

Recruitment Areas of the 1st Texas Infantry Regiment
Company	Nickname	Recruitment Area
A	Marion Rifles	Marion County
B	Livingston Guards	Polk County
C	Palmer Guards	Harris County
D	Star Rifles	Cass County
E	Marshall Guards	Harrison County
F	Woodville Rifles	Tyler County
G	Reagan Guards	Anderson County
H	Texas Guards	Anderson County
I	Crockett Southrons	Houston County
K	Texas Invincibles	San Augustine County
L	Lone Star Rifles	Galveston County
M	Sumter Light Infantry	Trinity County

== 1861 ==
By July 8, 1861, enough companies from Texas reached Richmond to form the 1st Texas Infantry Battalion. Because of the Battalion's unauthorized presence at Richmond, the Confederate government allowed the battalion to stay in the region with the condition that the government would pick their regimental officers. The government chose Louis T. Wigfall as lieutenant colonel and Hugh McLeod as major. The battalion was stationed in Richmond until the First Battle of Bull Run, as the Battalion was rushed to the front on a double-header train to reinforce Beauregard's forces along Bull Run (Occoquan River tributary). While en route to the front, the train dashed into a washed-out culvert during a thunderstorm and causing a wreck that killed and wounded 40 men of the battalion. Due to the train wreck, the battalion failed to reach the battle in time. However, the men were able to walk the battlefield and see the aftermath of the fight the day after the battle. The battalion proceeded with General Joseph E. Johnston in his pursuit of the Union Army from Manassas until being positioned on the Confederate right flank at Dumfries, Virginia.

By August 1861, enough companies joined to qualify the battalion to become an infantry regiment. Wigfall was promoted to colonel and McLeod to lieutenant colonel. Captain Alexander T. Rainey of Company A was promoted to major. Initially, the battalion was designated as the Second Texas Infantry Regiment, as another regiment was fully formed in Galveston, Texas before. However, due to Wigfall's political connections to Jefferson Davis, his command was given the honor of being designated as the 1st Texas Infantry Regiment, a grievance the 2nd Texas Infantry Regiment under Colonel John Creed Moore would not forget during their service.

The regiment continued to hold its position along the Dumfries Line for the rest of 1861. On October 22, 1861, the Texas Brigade was created when the 4th Texas Infantry Regiment under John Bell Hood and 5th Texas Infantry Regiment under James J. Archer arrived in Richmond and were brigaded with the 1st Texas Infantry at Dumfries, Virginia. Colonel Wigfall was promoted to brigade command as brigadier general while Lieutenant Colonel McLeod and Major Rainey were both promoted to colonel and lieutenant colonel respectively. Captain Harvey H. Black of Company A was promoted to the position of major. In November 1861, Brigadier General Wigfall was elected as senator of Texas and vacated his position, James J. Archer of 5th Texas assumed temporary command of the brigade. Later that month, the 18th Georgia Infantry Regiment under Colonel William T. Wofford were also added to the brigade. For the rest of the winter of 1861–1862, the 1st Texas Infantry with the rest of the Texas Brigade defended the Dumfries line until Major General George B. McClellan's invasion of the Virginia Peninsula in March 1862.

== 1862 ==
In January 1862, Colonel Hugh McLeod died of pneumonia; Lieutenant Colonel Rainey and Major Black were both promoted to colonel and lieutenant colonel respectively. On March 2, 1862, the regiment moved south with the Army of Northern Virginia to confront McClellan's flank movement at Yorktown, Virginia. The regiment arrived at the Siege of Yorktown (1862) on April 19, where they contributed sharpshooters to harass Yankee scouts and sharpshooters. The Federals quickly learned how effective the Pattern 1853 Enfield were in the hands of the Texans and Georgians of the Texas Brigade. By May 3, 1862, the Confederate forces pulled back from Yorktown and retreat towards Richmond, the Texas Brigade was detailed as the rearguard of William H.C. Whiting's Division. During their retreat up the peninsula, the 1st Texas along with its brigade was sent to confront an amphibious landing made by Brigadier General William B. Franklin's Division at the Battle of Eltham's Landing on May 7, 1862. John Bell Hood, the new commander of the Texas Brigade, drove the Yankees back to their boats during the brigade's first battle of the war and held the position until their baggage trains could pass safely. During the fight, Lieutenant Colonel Black was killed in action.

== Battle of Antietam ==
After subsequent action during the Seven Days, in which the regiment was heavily engaged at Gaines Mill, the Texas Brigade accompanied the Army Of Northern Virginia during the 2nd Bull Run campaign and into Maryland. The brigade saw limited action during the battle of South Mountain but saw heavy action in the subsequent engagement at Sharpsburg. The morning of September 17, 1862, saw the brigade resting in fields north of Sharpsburg. The men had been marching for several days, and had not had much time for a meal. Hence, the Texans were awakened with empty stomachs by artillery fire and the clash of musketry, being forced to leave behind the first hot breakfast they had eaten in days they rushed to the sounds of the heaviest fighting. After arriving at the Dunker Church, the brigade was rushed forward to a cornfield owned by a local farmer by the name of D.R. Miller. The brigade commenced a desperate counterattack to retake the Cornfield, which had been overrun by advancing Federal forces. The Texans clashed with the famed Iron Brigade who, having been heavily engaged earlier in the day, were exhausted and not an effective fighting force. The Iron Brigade quickly broke under the pressure of Hood's fresh, large division and fled. Colonel William T. Wofford quickly pushed the Texas Brigade forward into the void created by his regiments’ raking fire. However, the attack stalled, and the brigade halted and reform. With the order given, the 1st Texas started their advance deeper into the Cornfield. Almost immediately the Texans came under a galling fire from Union artillery, but the Texans kept up their march. The Yankees quickly broke under the Texans' onslaught and fled to the rear. The Texans, ecstatic over their apparent victory pushed on.

The 1st Texas unknowingly advanced to the Cornfields northern fence, only 30 yards away. But before they realized this mistake, a line of blue coated soldiers seemingly appeared out of the ground and delivered a volley into the Texans. Federal soldiers had been waiting for this moment now for some time because the retreating Union soldiers had warned that the enemy was coming right for them. The fire rolled in on the Texans from their right as the 12th Pennsylvania Reserves fired, followed by a volley from the 11th Reserves on the 12th's right. The Texans were still reeling from this shock when another volley swept through the 1st Texas from the far left as the 9th Pennsylvania Reserves fired their volley at the left oblique. The Texans had walked into a firestorm. At first the brave Texans tried to hold their ground under this solid wall of fire, but not even the hardened veterans of the 1st Texas could withstand such a deadly volley. The Texans fell back with the rest of the brigade and did not see any more major action during the battle.

== Battle of Gettysburg ==
On July 2, 1863, Brigadier General Jerome Robertson and his Texas Brigade arrived at Gettysburg around 9:00 a.m. Among the regiments under the command of Robertson was the 1st Texas Infantry. The 1st Texas fought hard during its time at Gettysburg and achieved much for fighting with lesser numbers than the enemy. Lieutenant Colonel Phillip A. Work commanded the 1st Texas and successfully took the major objectives that he was assigned to take.

Robertson and his Texas Brigade arrived at their position on Seminary Ridge, along with the rest of the Confederate forces, and quickly organized his regiments left to right with the 3rd Arkansas Infantry Regiment on the left, then the 1st Texas, 4th Texas, and 5th Texas. Soon after arrival on Seminary Ridge, both Union and Confederate artillery opened fire. According to General R. H. Anderson, the ridge that the enemy forces sat on was about twelve hundred yards away from the ridge that the Confederate forces positioned on. Anderson also mentioned that the area between the two ridges was “slightly undulating, enclosed by rail and plank fences and under cultivation.” For nearly an hour the Confederate troops stood in formation as the Union artillery collided with their lines. The troops of the 1st Texas infantry jumped as the cannon fire hit around them, as did the rest of the Confederate forces, but stood strong in their formation. The order to charge and take the heights was finally issued. As soon as he received the order, Lieutenant Colonel Phillip Work ran to the front of his regiment, pointed to his regiments flag and yelled “Follow the Lone Star Flag to the top of the mountain!”.

Robertson and his Texas Brigade faced many problems almost as soon as they moved off their original position on Seminary Ridge. The Federal batteries in The Peach Orchard area and above Devil's Den increased their fire. Robertson ordered the men to throw down a rail fence that obstructed their path. As soon as this obstruction was out of the way the men moved across Emmitsburg Road and continued forward. Robertson now faced a problem caused by Evander M. Law's Brigade. Robertson had orders to keep his left on Emmitsburg Road and his right on Law's left but Law's Brigade bore too sharply to the right and a large gap formed in the middle of Robertson's forces. The 3rd Arkansas and 1st Texas stubbornly stuck to the Emmitsburg Road while the 4th and 5th Texas regiments stuck with Law's forces. The 3rd Arkansas Infantry Regiment and 1st Texas now advanced to the west branch of Plum Run (Rock Creek) near the Timber's House and the Rose Woods. At this point the gap in Robertson's forces was over one hundred yards. Robertson tried to move his regiments back together but they were already engaged and so it became impossible. Robertson quickly made the decision to stick with the left wing and sent a message to Evander M. Law telling him to watch out for the 4th and 5th Texas.

The 1st Texas Infantry now moved up toward the triangular field and as soon as they were in the open started receiving artillery fire from Smith's battery on Houck's Ridge. The Texans continued moving until they reached a stone wall at the base of the triangular field. The 1st Texas found some safety behind this stone wall because the guns of Smith's battery could not depress far enough to fire on them. The troops formed two lines behind the wall with the front line kneeling behind the wall and the back line standing behind them. The Texans quickly opened fire on Smith's gunners and silenced the guns on the ridge. The men now jumped over the stone wall and rushed forward towards the guns but confusion soon followed. Part way up the hill the regiment heard orders to retreat and so they began to fall back but then received more orders that countermanded the first. Private James Bradfield recalled “No one seemed to know whence it came, nor from whom”. This first rush at the enemy made it within fifty yards of Smith's battery but was quickly repelled by the 124th New York Volunteer Infantry Regiment and Ward's Brigade. Next the Texans regrouped and pushed slowly forward a few feet at a time but they were once again repelled by the artillery atop the ridge and the 124th New York. The 124th now charged into the line of the 1st Texas and drove them back down the rocky slope. The 1st Texas infantry fell back to the southwest wall of the triangular field and held their ground here. As the New Yorkers charged through the open terrain and got within one hundred feet of the wall, the Texans opened fire and “dropped nearly one-quarter of them in their tracks”. The 124th of New York now surged forward once again but they had gone as far as they could go because Brigadier General Henry Benning's Brigade had arrived to support the tired Texans.

Benning began striding back and forth yelling “give them hell boys!”. Benning's left regiment, the 15th Georgia, now pressed up into the 1st Texas line to relieve them. The Texans refused to back down and so the two regiments mixed together, much to the displeasure of Colonel Work. Work didn't want the Georgians disrupting his line and thought that it would be better if Benning had flanked the enemy from the side instead. The two regiments could not be separated in the middle of the battle and so they fought as one single unit for the remainder of the evening. This support from Benning caused the 124th New York to fall back to their original position and the Confederate soldiers pushed forward into the rocks on Devil's Den. The battery atop Devil's Den continued firing for as long as they could but were soon overrun by the pressing Confederate forces. The two comingled regiments of the 1st Texas and the 15th Georgia were soon joined by the 20th Georgia and 44th Alabama and together they took on the combination of the remainder of the 124th New York, the 4th Maine Volunteer Infantry Regiment, and the 99th Pennsylvania Infantry regiments. After a short, close range melee the Confederates pushed off the Union and the capture of Devil's Den was official. The 1st Texas had managed to hold their ground long enough for reinforcements to arrive and it paid off for them greatly. The Confederates had captured the four guns of Smith's battery and took between one hundred forty and two hundred prisoners from their victory but the day wasn't over yet for the 1st Texas Infantry.

Over to the left, the 3rd Arkansas Infantry Regiment had not made any progress and so General Robertson ordered Colonel Work to leave two companies of his men on Houck's Ridge and to move the rest of his regiment to help support the 3rd Arkansas. The 1st Texas moved to support the 3rd Arkansas and when they arrived they were met with even more support from the 11th Georgia Infantry and 59th Georgia. Together these forces moved toward the enemy line in this area but the Federal troops in this area were too strong to move and every attack failed. The Confederates kept up the attack and eventually the growing pressure on the Federal line became so great that Ward's brigade and the 17th Maine Volunteer Infantry Regiment had to fall back. The 1st Texas regiment continued to move across the ridge north of Devil's Den, capturing Union soldiers along the way and eventually got to a position that they could fire at Winslow's battery on Little Round Top. Brooke's Union brigade now advanced through the Wheatfield but Colonel Work and the 1st Texas Regiment were ready and waiting. The 1st Texas and the 15th Georgia were sitting atop Houck's Ridge and as Brooke approached, Colonel Work ordered his regiment to put an enfilading fire into Brooke's men. As the enemy forces grew, the 1st Texas was forced to fall back towards the field. Colonel Work quickly became concerned about his ability to withdraw his troops and so he ordered the color bearer and some of his men to maintain their position while the rest of the regiment moved to the rear. Unfortunately this plan didn't work because the men refused to leave their flag behind and so the men stayed and continued to fight the Federal reinforcements by raking Brooke's left. The 1st Texas continued their fight until the evening then nightfall brought the end to the day's battles.

Around 2:00 A.M. on July 3, the 1st Texas and 3rd Arkansas moved to their right in order to rejoin the rest of Robertson's Brigade. All of the men were exhausted so they tossed down their gear in front of Little Round Top and got whatever sleep they could. Confederate officers feared an attack from the enemy and so they awakened the men to erect breastworks soon after they had fallen asleep. Major John Bane reported that by dawn the breastworks stood two feet high. Robertson's Brigade stayed in this position through the majority of the day and only participated in some skirmishing in their front. Many men were killed or wounded by the sharpshooting that proceeded through the day as well as the cannonade that preceded Pickett's Charge.

Around 3:00 P.M., Colonel Work received an order to move his 1st Texas regiment south to help defend against an anticipated cavalry charge. As the 1st Texas approached the Bushman house they were ordered to knock down part of the wooden fence that obstructed their path. The men proceeded another two hundred yards to take position behind a short stone wall near the edge of the Bushman Woods. Due to many losses from the day before, the 1st Texas didn't have enough men to properly cover the wall and so they deployed in a single thin line along the length of the stone wall. Work sent several units out to his left and right in order to protect against any flanking attacks. On the left flank, the men of the 1st Texas tore down a staked fence and rebuilt it beside the stone wall. Reilly's battery also took position about two hundred fifty yards behind the Texans. The men had just barely completed constructing their breastworks when the 1st West Virginia Volunteer Cavalry Regiment appeared. Private W. T. White of the 1st Texas noted that “they formed line of battle in plain view of us and charged. We held our fire until they were within fifty or sixty yards of us, when, taking deliberate aim, we fired on them, bringing down many men and horses.” The cavalry then retreated to their original position to regroup and then charged once again but were repelled just like the first time. The cavalry continued to charge and at this point the Texans had fired off their guns and so they used the butts of their guns as the cavalry got close. Private James Henderick also stated that many of the cavalry came up within a few feet of the 1st Texas regiment and so the men knocked them off their horses with rocks and whatever else they could find. The 1st Texas continued to kill many of the charging cavalrymen captured over one hundred prisoners. The men of the 1st Texas only got a short reprieve before the 18th Pennsylvania Cavalry arrived and charged their position. The Texans once again repelled the enemy and as Private White stated, “having repulsed the second charge, we felt that we could almost whip all the cavalry the enemy had.” The Union cavalry continued to make demonstrations against the 1st Texas for another two hours but Texan line held strong. As the evening rolled around, Robertson's Brigade received orders to move around the right flank to their original jump off position on Seminary Ridge.

Robertson's brigade was not fully utilized during July 2 and their problems arose almost as soon as they stepped off their position on Seminary Ridge. Even with these problems that their brigade faced, the 1st Texas regiment managed to achieve their major objectives. Colonel Work and the 1st Texas managed to take Devil's Den and Houck's Ridge through utilizing their terrain such as the stone walls of the triangular field. Even with their smaller forces, the 1st Texas managed to take these objectives and it is a testament to those men and their commander. The Texans then continued on to repel a massive Federal cavalry charge when they barely had enough men to cover their position. The use of terrain once again helped the 1st Texas and led them to a victory in their endeavors. This impressive regiment fought hard during their time at the battlefield and finally got a rest when they were ordered to retreat from Gettysburg late the night of July 4.

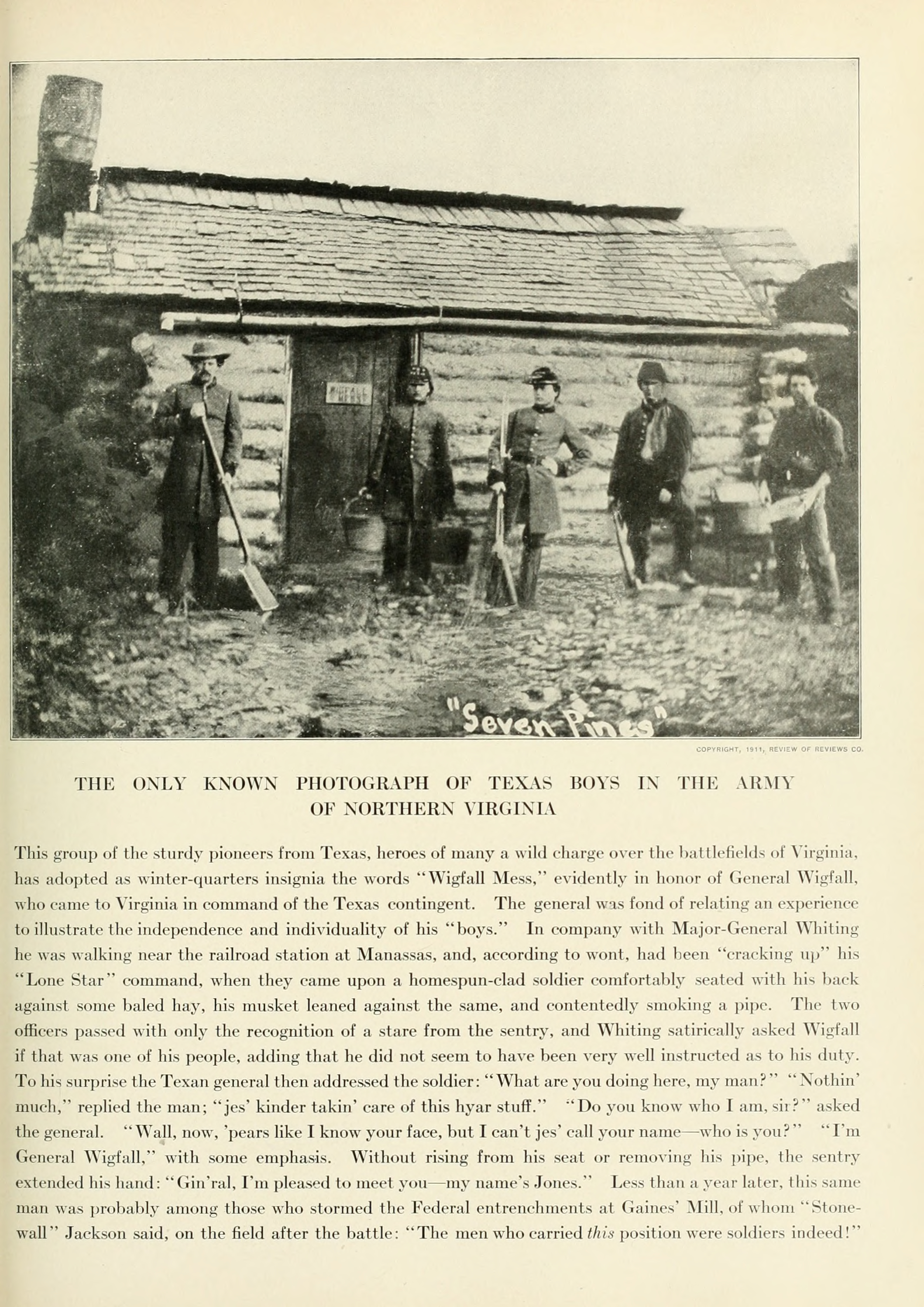
Soldiers of the 1st Texas Infantry pose before cabin labeled "Wigfall Mess"

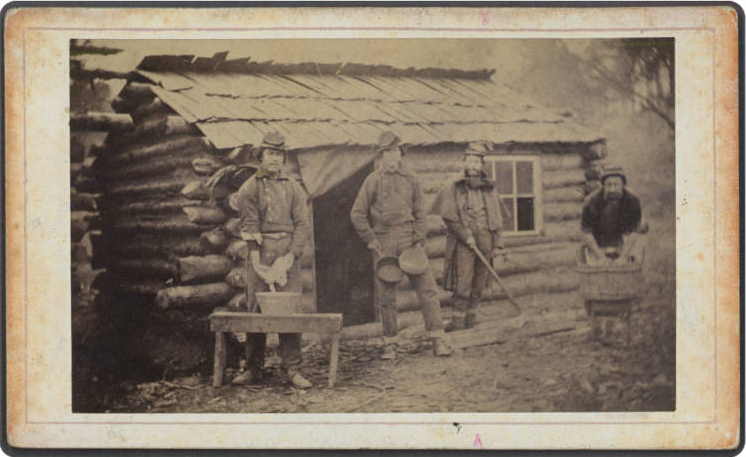
First Texas Infantry camp at Dumfries, Virginia

== See also ==
- Texas Civil War Confederate Units
- 141st Infantry Regiment (United States)
