= Second Battle of Bull Run order of battle =

The order of battle for the Second Battle of Bull Run includes:

- Second Battle of Bull Run order of battle: Confederate
- Second Battle of Bull Run order of battle: Union
