= First Battle of Bull Run order of battle =

The order of battle for the First Battle of Bull Run includes:

- First Battle of Bull Run order of battle: Confederate
- First Battle of Bull Run order of battle: Union
