= 18th Georgia Infantry Regiment =

Infantry regiment of the Confederate States Army

- Georgia State Flag prior to 1879
- Active: April 22, 1861 – April 9, 1865
- Country: Confederate States of America
- Allegiance: Georgia
- Branch: Confederate States Army
- Type: Infantry
- Size: Regiment (~350-400 men)
- Part of: Texas Brigade
- Engagements: Peninsula Campaign Northern Virginia Campaign; Maryland Campaign; Battle of Fredericksburg; Chancellorsville Campaign; Gettysburg campaign Knoxville Campaign; Wilderness Campaign; Siege of Petersburg Appomattox Campaign

Commanders
- Notable commanders: Brig Gen William T. Wofford Col Solon Z. Ruff; Col Joseph Armstrong; LtCol William H. Luse; Capt J. A. Crawford; Capt J. L. Lemon; Capt J. F. Espy Lt Gideon J. Lasseter

The 18th Georgia Infantry Regiment was an infantry regiment in the Confederate Army during the American Civil War. Originally brigaded with the three Texas regiments of John Bell Hood's Texas Brigade, it was transferred to Thomas R.R. Cobb's Georgia Brigade after the Battle of Antietam in late 1862. After General Cobb was mortally wounded at the Battle of Fredericksburg, the original colonel of the 18th Georgia, William T. Wofford, became Brigadier General of the Georgia Brigade.

== Organization ==
The regiment was organized at Camp Brown (located near Smyrna), Cobb County, Georgia, on April 22, 1861, under a special act of the Georgia legislature. (See also Philips' Legion Background and Formation). It was originally designated First Regiment, Fourth Brigade, State Troops under the following officers:

- Colonel William T. Wofford, Cass County
- Lieutenant Colonel Solon Z. Ruff of the Georgia Military Institute, Cobb County
- Major Jefferson Johnson, Floyd County
- Adjutant John C. Griffin, Cobb County.

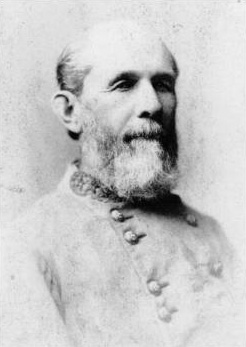
General W.T. Wofford

The volunteers trained at Camp Brown until transferring to Camp MacDonald at Big Shanty in present day Kennesaw; the new, 60-acre facility opened on June 11, 1861. Phillips, founder of the famed Phillips Legion, named the camp in honor of his former law mentor and governor of Georgia Charles J. McDonald.

The regiment drilled for two more months after which the "Fourth Brigade" was broken up and sent north on August 2, 1861. At that time, the 18th Georgia Volunteer Regiment was composed of ten companies of roughly 750 soldiers, mostly from central counties in Georgia.

- Company A: Cobb County — "Acworth Infantry"
- Company B: Newton County — "Newton Rifles"
- Company C: Jackson County — "Jackson County Volunteers"
- Company D: Dougherty County — "Davis Invincibles"
- Company E: Gordon County — "Stephens Infantry"
- Company F: Bartow County — "Davis Guards"
- Company G: Bartow County — "Lewis Volunteers"
- Company H: Bartow County — "Rowland Highlanders"
- Company I: Dooly County — "Dooly Light Infantry"
- Company K: Bartow County — "Rowland Infantry"

== Initial Deployment and Service ==
The 18th Georgia briefly guarded prisoners in Richmond captured at the First Battle of Bull Run (Manassas) and served garrison duty for two weeks in Goldsboro, North Carolina. In November they were sent north to the area of Dumfries, Virginia, along the Potomac River where they were attached to the 1st, 4th and 5th Texas infantry regiments to form a "full" Texas Brigade. For the next year they would be an integral member of the Texas Brigade as it fought from the Peninsula Campaign (May - July 1862) to Antietam.

The regiment was first engaged at the Battle of Eltham's Landing and the Battle of Seven Pines. It served conspicuously during the Seven Days Battle where, along with their Texas compatriots, they broke the line at the Battle of Gaines' Mill, effectively ending Union General McClellan's campaign, and resulting in regimental casualties of 37 killed and 106 wounded.

Two months later, the regiment distinguished itself again at the Second Battle of Bull Run (aka. Battle of Second Manassas) where members captured two stands of colors (those of the 24th and 10th New York Infantry regiments), and where, along with the Texas Brigade, they spearheaded General Longstreet's assault on Union General John Pope's left, nearly wiping out the 5th New York Zouaves and captured a battery of four guns. Regimental casualties were 37 dead and 87 wounded.

Three weeks later, September 1862, the 18th GA fought at the Battle of Antietam losing 14 killed and 30 wounded.

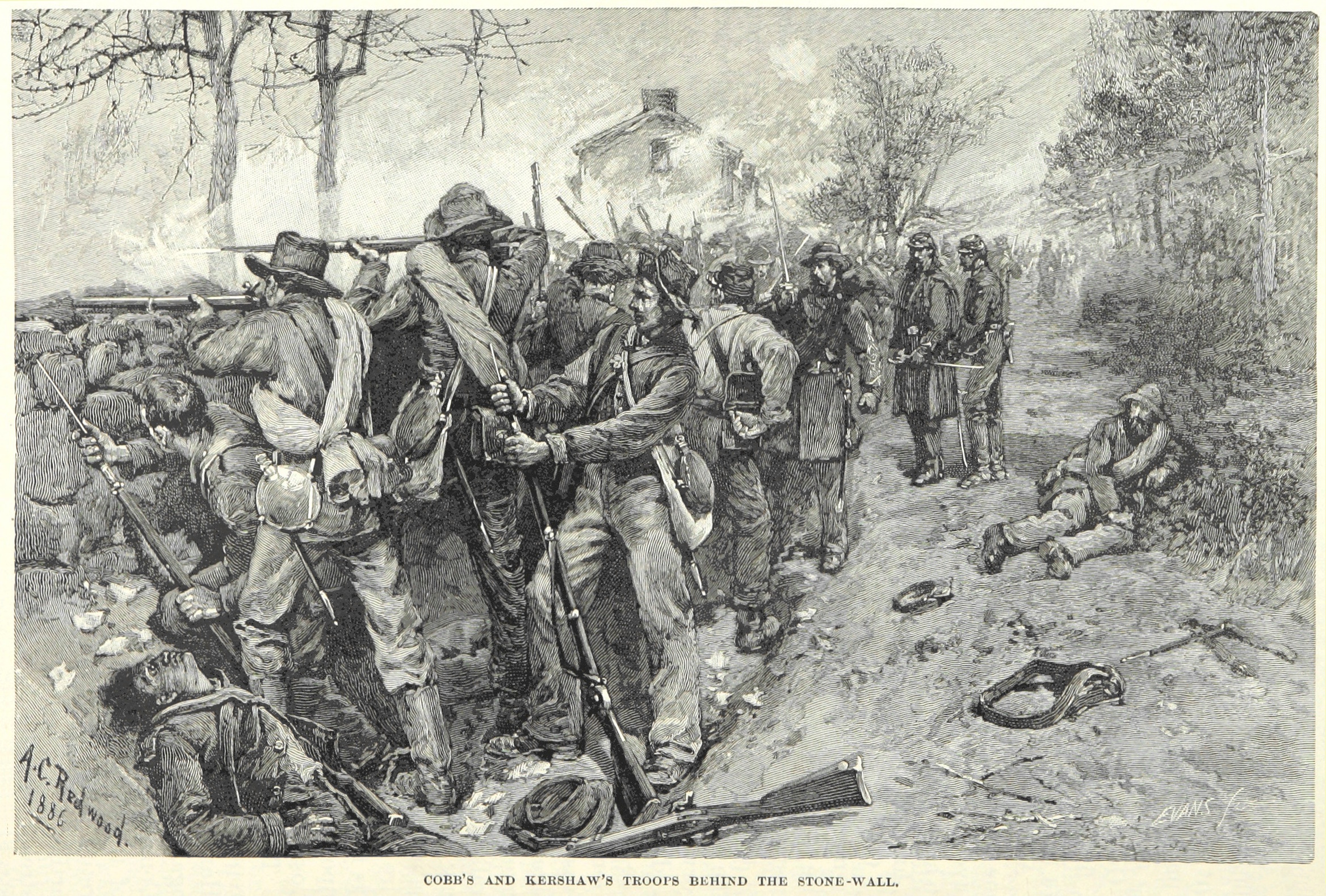
Cobb's and Kershaw's troops behind the stone wall

Under orders of the Confederate States War Department, the 18th Georgia Infantry was transferred from the Texas Brigade to Cobb's Georgia Brigade, McLaws' Division, remaining in Longstreet's Corps. Cobb's Brigade was now composed of the 16th, 24th, and 18th Georgia Regiments, Cobb's Legion, and Phillips' Legion. (The 18th GA remained assigned to Longstreet's Corps until the end of the war.) Now consisting of 160 barefoot men the 18th GA went into camp at Fredericksburg, Virginia. In the ensuing Battle of Fredericksburg, the regiment fought behind the stone wall on Marye's Heights sustaining losses of 14 killed and 30 wounded while inflicting heavy casualties upon the enemy. General Cobb bled to death from wounds sustained during the battle. May 1, Col. Wofford assumed command of the Texas Brigade.

Jackson's Corps, with McLaws' Division on the left flank, remained on the Fredericksburg front until the night of May 1. On that night, Jackson's force (containing the 18th GA) left Fredericksburg to outflank the outflanking Federal army. Thus began the Battle of Chancellorsville. After days of fighting, the 18th GA's casualties totaled 86; 14 killed and 72 wounded.

In June, 1863, Gen. Lee launched his second invasion of the north. Around Gettysburg, on the second day of battle after taking the city, Lee ordered Longstreet's Corps to attack diagonally from Little Round Top northward. The Confederate attack, coming late in the afternoon, saw Longstreet capture the positions west of Little Round Top known as Peach Orchard, Wheat Field, and Devil's Den on the Federal left. But, he failed to seize the vital Little Round Top.

After Gettysburg, the 18th GA retreated to an area near Manassas Gap, in Virginia. They fought a skirmish at Snickers Gap, Virginia on July 23, 1863, and did not see action again until October.

In September 1863, Longstreet's Corps left the Army of Northern Virginia by rail to join the Battle of Chickamauga in northwest Georgia, near Dalton. The corps bolstered the forces of General Braxton Bragg's Army of Tennessee. But, the 18th Georgia did not participate since they arrived on the field the day after the battle. October 28 and 29, 1863 found the 18th Georgia engaged in battles around Wauhatchie, Tennessee.

Bragg sent Longstreet's Corps off, with the 18th GA, in a futile attempt to capture Knoxville on November 5. The 18th Georgia Regiment found itself in a small skirmish on November 15 at Little River, Tennessee. On the 29th, Longstreet attacked Fort Sanders, but his troops were slaughtered in the ditches around the fort. He withdrew, and on December 3 started northward. By December 12, 1863, his forces arrived at Rogersville, and on the 15th he attempted to capture three brigades of Federal cavalry at the Battle of Bean's Station. The attempt failed although it was a Confederate victory.

January 16 and 17, 1864, the 18th Georgia was engaged in operations around Dandridge, Tennessee, east of Knoxville. April 11, Longstreet received orders to return to the Army of Northern Virginia.

By May 5, Longstreet was back in the lines with General Lee. On May 5, 1864, Gen. Longstreet's Corps was hit by the Federals on Old Turnpike and Orange Plank Road in the Battle of the Wilderness. By May 7, the Union had lost and General Grant was looking to maneuver around Lee's forces.

But, on May 8, Grant met heavy resistance at the famous Battle of Spotsylvania Courthouse. By May 12, savage hand-to-hand fighting at Bloody Angle with Longstreet's men in the left flank. May 19, the battle finally ended with Grant being thrown back. The same forces met again, at North Anna River, May 22 – May 26, the Pamunky River, May 26–28, and at the Totopotomy Creek, May 28–31.

Then, at the Battle of Cold Harbor (May 31 - June 12), northeast of Richmond, Grant launched several very heavy attacks against Lee's army, including the 18th Georgia Regiment.

The 18th Georgia Regiment is listed as being engaged in the Assault on Petersburg, June 18, 1864. The siege of Petersburg lasted from June 16, 1864 until April 1865.

August 7, 1864, the unit was reassigned to operations against Sheridan's Campaign in the Shenandoah Valley where the 18th Georgia saw many small battles. August 16, they were engaged at Cedarville, and Guard Hill (Front Royal), Virginia. They next saw action at Bunker Hill, West Virginia September 2 and 3rd. On September 19, they saw action in the Battle of Opequan in Winchester, Virginia. Three days later, on the 22nd, the regiment saw action at the Battle of Fisher's Hill near Strasburg, Virginia. And lastly, on October 19, 1864, the unit saw action in the Battle of Cedar Creek, Middletown, and Belle Grove, Virginia.

November 30, 1864, the 18th GA was reassigned to the Army of Northern Virginia and moved back to Richmond. The siege on Petersburg and Richmond continued until Lee was forced to evacuate both cities April 2 and 3, 1865. An 88 mile (142 km) chase ensued down the Appomattox River to the southwest. Confederate forces were detained at Amelia Courthouse April 4 and 5, waiting for supplies that never arrived. The Confederates, including the 18th Georgia, were badly cut up on April 6 at the Battle of Sailor's Creek.

Finally, on April 8, 1865 the 18th Georgia Regiment, assigned to Gen. Kershaw's Division, Gen. Longstreet's First Corps, Army of Northern Virginia was represented at the surrender of Confederate Forces at Appomattox Court House by less than 60 members, the highest ranking of which was one Lieutenant Gideon J. Lasseter.

== Campaigns and Battles ==
Campaign	Battles that included the 18th	Notes
Peninsula Campaign (March 17 – August 3, 1862)	Battle of Eltham's Landing (May 7, 1862); Battle of Seven Pines (May 31 – June 1, 1862); Seven Days Battles (June 25 – July 1, 1862); Battle of Gaines's Mill (June 27, 1862); Battle of Malvern Hill (July 1, 1862)	18th GA was under the command of Col William T. Wofford and LtCol Solon Z. Ruff. The 18th lost 146 killed or wounded at Gaines's Mill where they were used as "shock troops".
Northern Virginia Campaign (July 19 – September 1, 1862)	2nd Battle of Manassas (August 26 – 30)	18th GA Rgmt lost 19 killed / 114 wounded
Maryland Campaign (September 3 – 17, 1862)	Battle of Boonsboro Gap (September 14, 1862); Battle of Sharpsburg (September 17, 1862)	Boonsboro Gap was called the Battle of South Mountain by the Union. At Sharpsburg (Antietam), LtCol Solon Z. Ruff in command of the 18th went into battle with 176 men, losing 101 of those (57%) killed, wounded, or missing.
No Campaign	Battle of Fredericksburg (December 11 – 15, 1862)	LtCol William H. Luse in command of the 18th, going into Fredericksburg, consisted of 160 barefoot men, transferred to Cobb's Brigade, McLaws' Division, remaining in Longstreet's Corps.
Chancellorsville Campaign (April 30 – May 6, 1863)	Battle of Chancellorsville (April 30 – May 6, 1863)	Col Solon Z. Ruff in Command of the 18th whose casualties totaled 86; 14 killed / 72 wounded
Gettysburg campaign (June 29 – July 3, 1863)	Battle of Gettysburg, First Day (July 1, 1863); Battle of Gettysburg, Second Day (July 2, 1863); The Wheatfield	Col Solon Z. Ruff in Command of the 18th
Knoxville Campaign (November 6 – December 16, 1863)	Battle of Campbell's Station (November 16, 1863); Battle of Fort Sanders (November 29, 1863); Battle of Bean's Station (December 14, 1863)	18th GA now under the command of Capt J.A. Crawford
Wilderness Campaign (May 4 – 7, 1864)	Battle of the Wilderness (May 5 – 7, 1864); Spotsylvania (May 8 – 21, 1864); Battle of Cold Harbor (May 31 – June 12, 1864)	
Richmond-Petersburg Campaign (June 4, 1864 – April 2, 1865)	First Battle of Deep Bottom (July 27 – 29, 1864)	At First Deep Bottom, Col Joseph Armstrong commanding the 18th.
Valley Campaigns of 1864 (August 7 – November 28, 1864)	Battle of Guard Hill (August 16, 1864); Battle of Fisher's Hill (September 21 – 22, 1864); Battle of Cedar Creek (October 19, 1864)	
Siege of Petersburg (November 30, 1864 – April 2, 1865)		
Appomattox Campaign (April 3 – 9, 1865)	Battle of Sailor's Creek (April 6, 1865); Appomattox Court House (April 9, 1865)	During the campaign, the 18th was under the command of Capt J. F. Espy and Lt Gideon J. Lasseter. Capt Espy moved to take command of Brig Gen DuBose's Brigade when DuBose was captured at Sailor's Creek, and Lasseter stepped in to command the 18th. Their division commander, Maj. Gen. Joseph B. Kershaw, was also captured at Sailor's Creek.

== See also ==
- Peninsula Campaign Confederate Order of Battle
- Second Bull Run Confederate order of battle
- Antietam Confederate order of battle
- Fredericksburg Confederate order of battle
- Chancellorsville Confederate order of battle
- Gettysburg Confederate order of battle
- List of Civil War regiments from Georgia
