= William T. Wofford =

Confederate States general (1824–1884)

William Tatum Wofford
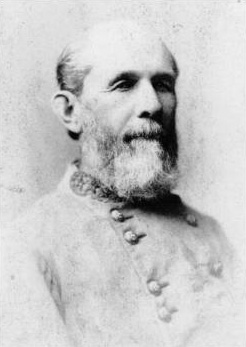
- Born: June 28, 1824; Toccoa, Habersham County, Georgia, U.S.
- Died: May 22, 1884 (aged 59); Cass Station, Georgia, U.S.
- Burial place: Cassville Cemetery; Cass Station, Georgia, U.S.
- Military career
- Allegiance: United States of America; Confederate States of America
- Branch: United States Army; Confederate States Army
- Service years: 1847–48 (USA); 1861–65 (CSA)
- Rank: Captain (USA); Brigadier General (CSA)
- Conflicts: Mexican–American War; American Civil War; Battle of Yorktown; Battle of Eltham's Landing; Battle of Seven Pines; Second Battle of Bull Run; Battle of Antietam; Battle of Fredericksburg; Battle of Chancellorsville; Battle of Gettysburg; Battle of the Wilderness; Battle of Spotsylvania Court House; Battle of Guard Hill
- Other work: planter; educator; politician

William Tatum Wofford (June 28, 1824 – May 22, 1884) was an American military officer who saw action in the Mexican–American War and later served as a general in the Confederate States Army during the American Civil War.

== Early life and career ==
Wofford was born near Toccoa in Habersham County, Georgia, to William H. Wofford and Nancy M. Tatum. In 1827, the Wofford family drew a Cass (Bartow) County land lot during the Georgia Land Lottery and moved there shortly thereafter. In 1836, at the age of 13, he was sent to the Gwinnett Manual Labor Institute in Lawrenceville, Georgia. In 1839, he graduated from Gwinnett Institute and entered Franklin College, now part of the University of Georgia. He graduated from Franklin College in 1844. Wofford first experienced military life in 1847 during the Mexican–American War, where he was a captain in the Georgia Mounted Volunteers. Wofford was mustered out of the volunteer service on July 12, 1848, and afterward worked as a planter, served as a state legislator, and then became a lawyer. In 1852 he was editor of the Cassville Standard newspaper.

== Civil War service ==
Wofford had previously voted against secession, but offered his services to his state and the Confederate Army. He was appointed a colonel in the Georgia State Militia, then a captain in the 18th Georgia Infantry in April 1861. On April 25 Wofford was promoted to colonel, and served in North Carolina and Virginia before being assigned to Brig. Gen. John Bell Hood's Texas Brigade. He saw action at Yorktown, Eltham's Landing, and Seven Pines during the Peninsula Campaign. Wofford and the 18th also fought at Second Bull Run and Antietam, where he commanded the Texas Brigade.

In November 1862, Wofford and the 18th Georgia were transferred to the Georgia Brigade of Brig. Gen. Thomas R. R. Cobb. They fought under Cobb at the Battle of Fredericksburg in December, defending the famous stone wall at the base of Marye's Heights. Cobb was mortally wounded in the battle, and Wofford assumed command of his brigade and was promoted to brigadier general on January 17, 1863. He led the brigade, now referred to as Wofford's Brigade, at Chancellorsville and Gettysburg, where he followed William Barksdale's Mississippi brigade in the assault through the Peach Orchard late in the afternoon of July 2. There Wofford's men drove Union troops out of the Wheatfield but had to stop short of the new Union line near Little Round Top.

Traveling to Georgia with Longstreet's First Corps to reinforce the Army of Tennessee, Wofford arrived on the field too late to participate in the Battle of Chickamauga. His whereabouts are unknown during Longstreet's subsequent siege of Knoxville, Tennessee; He may have taken leave following news of the death of his daughter.

Wofford fought in the Overland Campaign at the Wilderness and Spotsylvania Court House, and was wounded in both battles. He left the Army of Northern Virginia before the Richmond-Petersburg Campaign and assumed command of the Subdistrict of Northern Georgia, of the District of Georgia, Department of South Carolina, Georgia, and Florida on January 20, 1865, a post he held until he surrendered in Kingston, Georgia, and was paroled at Resaca, Georgia on May 2, 1865. Shortly afterward Wofford was pardoned by the U.S. government on July 24. He commanded the last significant group of Confederate soldiers east of the Mississippi to surrender to Union troops.

== Postbellum career ==
After the war Wofford was a planter and active in the law, Democratic politics, and education. As a delegate to the Georgia Constitutional Convention of 1877, he argued for the repeal of convict leasing, for Confederate veterans' benefits, and for African-American education. Many of his ideas appeared in the platform of the Populist Party a decade later. He died in Cassville, Georgia, and is buried in nearby Cassville Cemetery.

== See also ==
- List of signers of the Georgia Ordinance of Secession
- Confederate States of America, causes of secession, "Died of states' rights"
- List of American Civil War generals (Confederate)
