= William H. C. Whiting =

Confederate States Army general

Major General William H.C. Whiting
- Born: March 22, 1824; Biloxi, Mississippi, U.S.
- Died: March 10, 1865 (aged 40); Fort Columbus, Governors Island, New York, U.S.
- Burial place: Oakdale Cemetery, Wilmington, North Carolina
- Spouse: Katherine Davis
- Military career
- Allegiance: United States of America; Confederate States of America
- Branch: United States Army; Confederate States Army
- Service years: 1845–61 (USA); 1861–65 (CSA)
- Rank: Captain (USA); Major General (CSA)
- Nickname: Little Billy
- Conflicts: American Civil War

William Henry Chase Whiting (March 22, 1824 – March 10, 1865) was a United States Army officer who resigned after 16 years of service in the Army Corps of Engineers to serve in the Confederate States Army during the American Civil War. He was wounded at the Second Battle of Fort Fisher by a musket ball to his leg, and died in prison camp on March 10, 1865, of dysentery.

== Early life ==
William Whiting was born on March 22, 1824, in the coastal community of Biloxi in southern Mississippi. At the age of 12, he was an outstanding student and graduate of English High School of Boston in Boston, Massachusetts. At 16, he graduated from Georgetown College (now University) in Washington, DC. The son of Lieutenant Colonel Levi Whiting, a respected officer in the 1st Artillery Regiment, and Mary A. Whiting, he continued to impress his instructors at the United States Military Academy at West Point, from which he graduated first in the class of 1845.

Appointed second lieutenant of engineers, Whiting was involved in constructing seacoast defenses in Maryland and Florida, and surveying military routes and frontier forts in West Texas. Whiting served at Fort Davis, Texas. He was the first to survey the Big Bend area for the U.S. Army. Promoted to first lieutenant in 1853, Whiting was sent west, erecting harbor fortifications in San Francisco, California, and serving on the board of engineers for Pacific Coast defenses until 1856. Lt. Whiting spent the five years before the Civil War improving rivers, canals, and harbors in North Carolina, South Carolina, Georgia, and Florida. He was promoted to captain in the Corps of Engineers in 1858.

== Civil War ==
In January 1861, Captain Whiting was an engineer responsible for US Army installations in Georgia and Florida. As Georgia and Florida state militia seized these sites by force, Whiting took no discernible action. On January 3, Whiting received information that Georgia was moving to take Fort Marion, but he made no effort to warn the garrison there or its commander. By the end of the month, more than half a dozen U.S. Army forts, arsenals, and barracks had fallen to state forces without any action by Whiting.

Whiting resigned his commission February 20, 1861, in the weeks before Fort Sumter. He was appointed major of engineers in the ACSA, the regular Confederate States Army, on March 16. While improving the defenses of Charleston harbor, he was also named brigadier and inspector general of the North Carolina Militia. During the first Battle of Fort Sumter, he served on the staff of General P.G.T. Beauregard, who praised his work. Later, Whiting served under General Joseph E. Johnston as chief engineer of the Army of the Shenandoah and at the First Battle of Bull Run. After a brief service as inspector general, he was promoted to brigadier general on July 21, 1861, and became a brigade commander serving in the Aquia District under Major General Theophilus H. Holmes.

On December 19, Whiting sent a letter to President Jefferson Davis declining his assignment to command five fresh Mississippi regiments, and instead gave unsolicited advice and criticism to his superiors. Davis, himself a Mississippian, ordered the suspension of Whiting from his rank and position, effectively demoting him to major of engineers again. Only due to General Joe Johnston's hearty requests and protests was Whiting reinstated to his rank.

By early 1862, Whiting had been assigned to Maj. Gen. Gustavus W. Smith's division in Fredericksburg, a division that Whiting led during Smith's absences. The division comprised the commands of several brigadier generals who would distinguish themselves over the course of the war, notably John Bell Hood, Wade Hampton III, and Evander Law, as well as Colonel Dorsey Pender.

During the Peninsula Campaign, Whiting accompanied Johnston to Yorktown to examine the fortifications built by General John B. Magruder. His division was present during the month-long siege. On the Confederate withdrawal from Yorktown to Richmond, Whiting's men were responsible for blocking a Union flanking maneuver by sea, at the Battle of Eltham's Landing.

A few days before the Battle of Seven Pines, Johnston named Smith as a wing commander, and Whiting assumed operational command of the division during the battle. Whiting attempted to flank Union General Darius Couch's position, but was stopped by the arrival of Brig. Gen. John Sedgwick's division, which resisted repeated Confederate attacks. After Joe Johnston was wounded, Gustavus Smith became temporary army commander, but suffered from illness and a nervous breakdown, forcing him to cede command of the army to General Robert E. Lee. Whiting became permanent division commander following an army reorganization that left him with only two brigades instead of the five he had at Seven Pines. During the Battle of Gaines Mill, Whiting's division performed the decisive breakthrough of the Union lines at Boatswain's Creek. At Malvern Hill, he participated in the futile assault on the massed Union artillery atop the hill. After the Seven Days Battles were over, Robert E. Lee was dissatisfied with Whiting's performance and replaced him with Brig. Gen. John Bell Hood.

Whiting was assigned to command the more peaceful Military District of Wilmington, North Carolina. Finally promoted to major general on February 13, 1863, Whiting was assigned command of the Department of North Carolina and Southern Virginia, briefly taking over the Petersburg defenses in May 1864. By late 1864, Whiting found himself defending the district against forces under Maj. Gen. Alfred Howe Terry in the Wilmington Campaign. Wounded in the right thigh and hip, he was captured in the Second Battle of Fort Fisher. Angry that his superior, General Braxton Bragg, failed to use the division of Maj. Gen. Robert Hoke to attack the federal rear while the fort was under assault, Whiting requested an investigation of his superior's actions from his prison cell.

Taken prisoner with the rest of fort's defenders, and weakened by war service and the injuries suffered at Fort Fisher, Whiting died of dysentery at the Union military hospital at Fort Columbus on Governors Island in New York City on March 10, 1865. He was buried a few miles distant at Green-Wood Cemetery in Brooklyn. His widow, Kate, had his body exhumed in 1900 and moved to Oakdale Cemetery in Wilmington, North Carolina.

Whiting's brother, Major Jasper Strong Whiting, died of scarlet fever on December 25, 1862. Another brother, Robert Edward Kerr Whiting, was later in charge of Woodlawn Cemetery in Westchester County (now the Bronx).

Whiting is posthumously credited with the authorship of several works:

- Diary of a March from El Paso to San Antonio (1902)
- Whiting Diary: March from Frederickburg to El Paso del Norte (1905/1906)
- Exploring the Southwestern Trails, 1846–1854 (1938, other posthumous co-authors are François Xavier Aubry and Philip St. George Cooke)

On July 23, 2012, the Cape Fear Museum in Wilmington unveiled Whiting's uniform for exhibition.

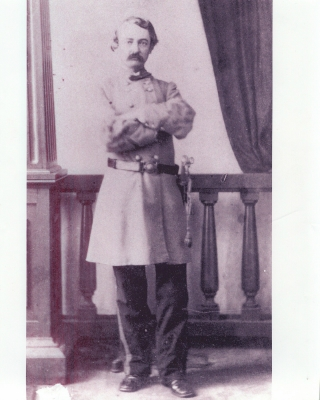
William H. C. Whiting, standing

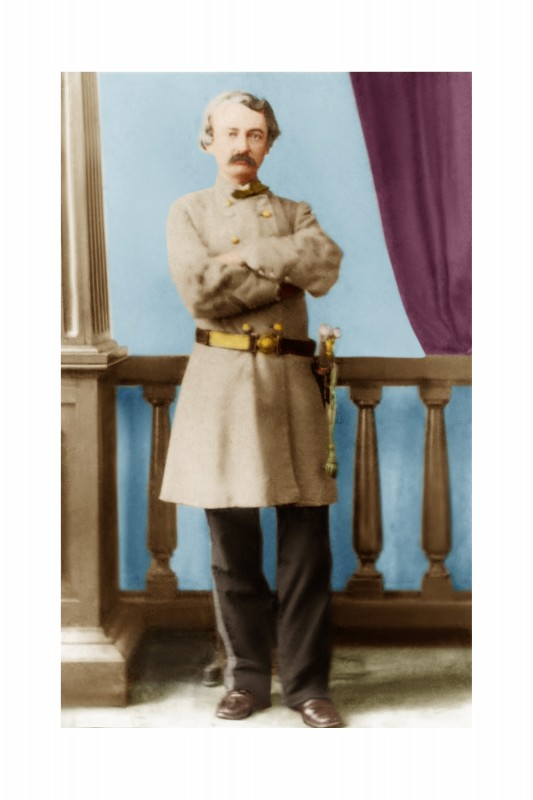
Digitized and colorized image of W. H. C. Whiting

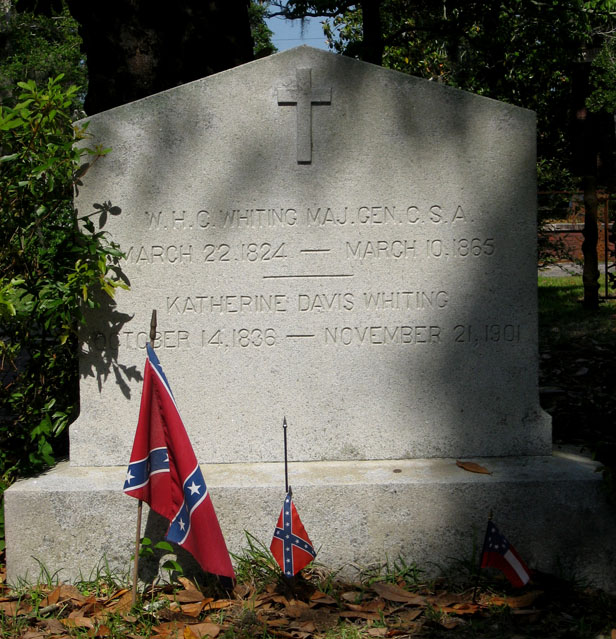
William H. C. Whiting gravesite

== See also ==
- List of American Civil War generals (Confederate)
