= Battle of Eltham's Landing =

Battle of the American Civil War

Coordinates: 37.5002°N 76.8423°W

- Part of the American Civil War
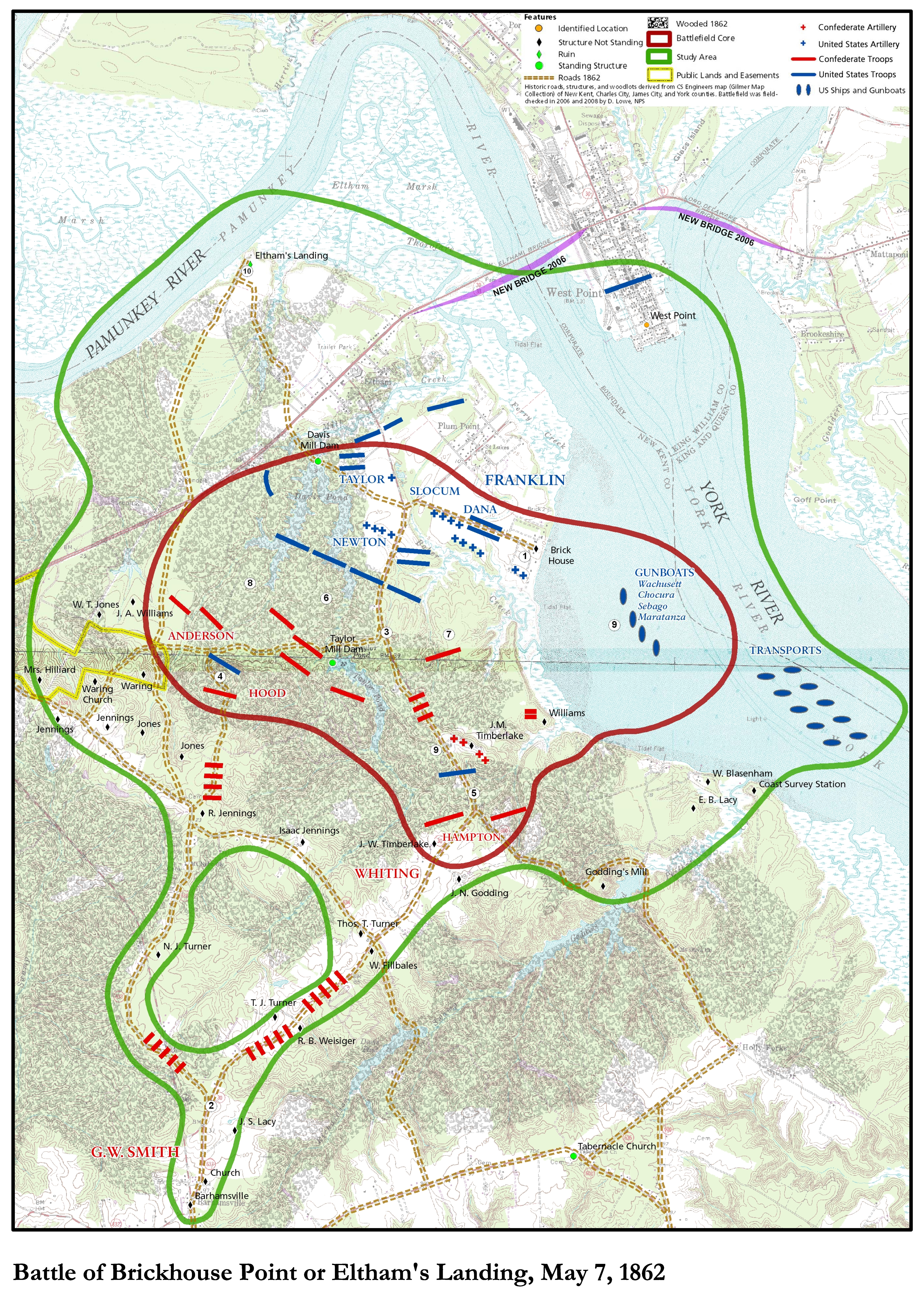
- Battle of Brickhouse Point or Eltham's Landing, May 7, 1862
| Date | May 7, 1862 |
| Location | New Kent County, Virginia |
| Result | Inconclusive |

Belligerents
| United States (Union) | (Confederate States of America) Confederate States (Confederacy) |

Commanders and leaders
| (United States) William B. Franklin | (Confederate States of America) G. W. Smith (Confederate States of America) William H. C. Whiting |

Strength
| 11,300 | 11,000 |

Casualties and losses
| 194 | 48 |

The Battle of Eltham's Landing, also known as the Battle of Barhamsville, or West Point, took place on May 7, 1862, in New Kent County, Virginia, as part of the Peninsula Campaign of the American Civil War. Brig. Gen. William B. Franklin's Union division landed at Eltham's Landing and was attacked by two brigades of Brig. Gen. G. W. Smith's command, reacting to the threat to the Confederate army's trains on the Barhamsville Road. Franklin's movement occurred while the Confederate army was withdrawing from the Williamsburg line, but he was unable to interfere with the Confederate movement.

== Background ==
When Confederate General Joseph E. Johnston unexpectedly withdrew his forces from the Warwick Line at the Battle of Yorktown the night of May 3, Union Maj. Gen. George B. McClellan was taken by surprise and was unprepared to mount an immediate pursuit. On May 4, he ordered cavalry commander Brig. Gen. George Stoneman to pursue Johnston's rearguard and sent approximately half of his Army of the Potomac along behind Stoneman, under the command of Brig. Gen. Edwin V. Sumner. These troops fought in the inconclusive Battle of Williamsburg on May 5, after which the Confederates continued to move northwest in the direction of Richmond.

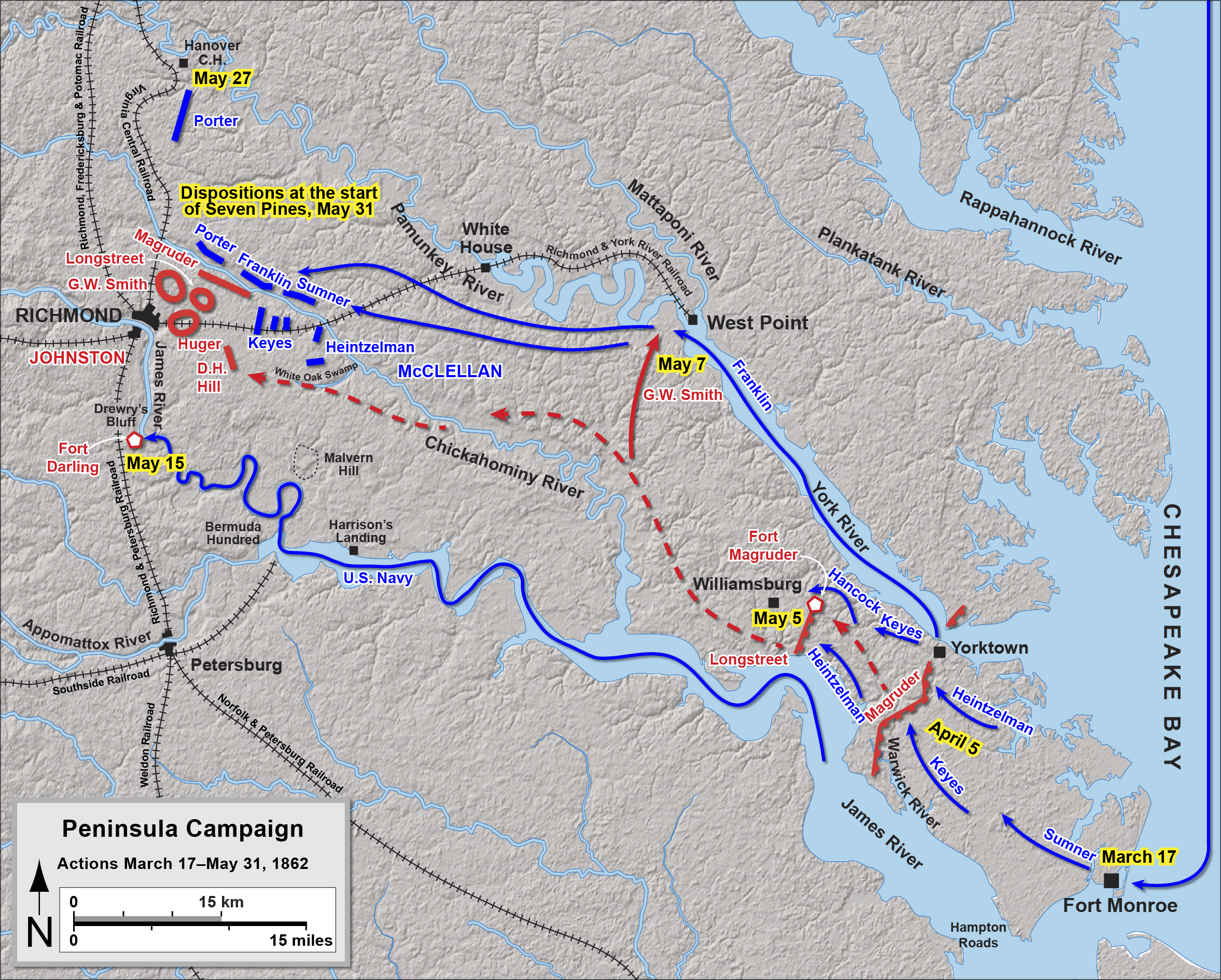
Peninsula Campaign, map of events up to the Battle of Seven Pines. Confederate Union

McClellan also ordered Brig. Gen. William B. Franklin's division to board transport ships on the York River in an attempt to land and cut off Johnston's retreat. It took two days just to board the men and equipment onto the ships, so Franklin was of no assistance to the Williamsburg action. But McClellan had high hopes for his turning movement, planning to send other divisions (those of Brig. Gens. Fitz John Porter, John Sedgwick, and Israel B. Richardson) by river after Franklin's. Their destination was Eltham's Landing on the south bank of the Pamunkey River across from West Point, a port on the York River, which was the terminus of the Richmond and York River Railroad. From the landing, it was about 5 miles (8.0 km) south to the small town of Barhamsville, where a key intersection on the road to New Kent Court House was being used by Johnston's army on the afternoon of May 6.

Franklin's men came ashore in light pontoon boats and a 400-foot (120 m) long floating wharf was then built from pontoons, canal boats, and lumber, so that artillery and supplies could be unloaded. The work was continued by torchlight through the night and the only enemy resistance was a few random shots fired by Confederate pickets on the bluff above the landing, ending at about 10 p.m.

== Battle ==
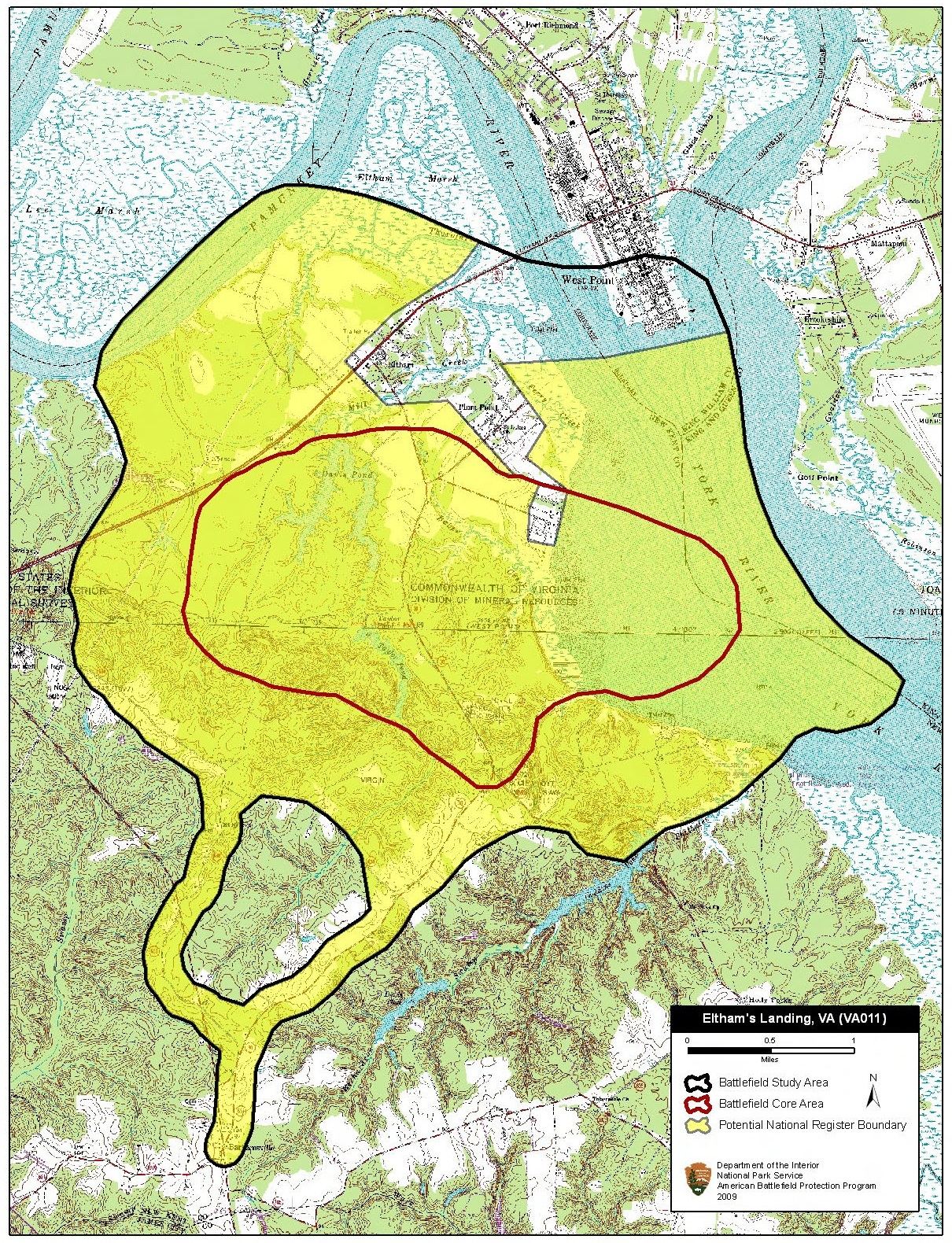
Map of Eltham's Landing Battlefield core and study areas by the American Battlefield Protection Program.

Johnston ordered Maj. Gen. G. W. Smith to protect the road to Barhamsville and Smith assigned the division of Brig. Gen. William H. C. Whiting and Hampton's Legion, under Colonel Wade Hampton, to the task. On May 7, Franklin posted Brig. Gen. John Newton's brigade in the woods on either side of the landing road, supported in the rear by portions of two more brigades (Brig. Gens. Henry W. Slocum and Philip Kearny). Newton's skirmish line was pushed back as Brig. Gen. John Bell Hood's Texas Brigade advanced, with Hampton to his right. Hood was concerned about casualties from friendly fire in the thick woods, so he ordered his men to advance with unloaded rifles. Encountering a Union picket line 15 paces away, Hood wrote, "A corporal of the enemy drew down his musket upon me as I stood in front of my line." Fortunately for Hood, Private John Deal of the 4th Texas Infantry had disobeyed his orders and carried a loaded rifle; he managed to shoot the Union corporal before the latter could fire.

As a second brigade followed Hood on his left, the Union troops retreated from the woods to the plain before the landing, seeking cover from the fire of Federal gunboats. Whiting employed artillery fire against the gunboats, but his guns had insufficient range, so he disengaged around 2 p.m. Union troops moved back into the woods after the Confederates left, but made no further attempt to advance.

== Aftermath ==
The Battle at Eltham's Landing was little more than a heavy skirmish. There were 194 Union casualties and 48 Confederate. Franklin told McClellan, "I congratulate myself that we have maintained our position." Although the action was tactically inconclusive, Franklin missed an opportunity to intercept the Confederate retreat from Williamsburg, allowing it to pass unmolested.

Johnston was pleased with the outcome. Considering the success his men enjoyed in executing the order "to feel the enemy gently and fall back," he humorously asked General Hood, "What would your Texans have done, sir, if I had ordered them to charge and drive back the enemy?" Hood replied, "I suppose, General, they would have driven them into the river, and tried to swim out and capture the gunboats."
