= Knoxville campaign order of battle: Confederate =

The following Confederate States Army units and commanders fought in the Knoxville Campaign and subsequent East Tennessee operations during the American Civil War from November 4 to December 31, 1863, under the command of Lt. Gen. James Longstreet. Engagements of this campaign include the Battle of Dandridge and the Battle of Bean's Station. Order of battle compiled from the army organization during the campaign. The Union order of battle is shown separately.

== Abbreviations used ==
=== Military rank ===
- LTG = Lieutenant General
- MG = Major General
- BG = Brigadier General
- Col = Colonel
- Ltc = Lieutenant Colonel
- Maj = Major
- Cpt = Captain
- Lt = Lieutenant

=== Other ===
- w = wounded
- mw = mortally wounded
- k = killed
- c = captured

== Longstreet's Command ==
LTG James Longstreet

Division	Brigade	Regiments and Others
McLaws' Division; MG Lafayette McLaws	Kershaw's Brigade BG Joseph B. Kershaw	2nd South Carolina: Col John D. Kennedy; 3rd South Carolina: Col James D. Nance; 7th South Carolina: Col D. Wyatt Aiken; 8th South Carolina: Col John W. Henagan; 15th South Carolina: Col Joseph F. Gist; 3rd South Carolina Battalion: Ltc William G. Rice
McLaws' Division; MG Lafayette McLaws	Wofford's Brigade Col Solon Z. Ruff (k) Ltc N.L. Hutchins Jr.	16th Georgia: Col James S. Gholston; 18th Georgia: Cpt J.A. Crawford; 24th Georgia: Col Robert McMillan; 3rd Battalion Georgia Sharpshooters: Ltc N.L. Hutchins Jr.
McLaws' Division; MG Lafayette McLaws	Humphreys' Brigade BG Benjamin Humphreys	13th Mississippi: Col Kennon McElroy (k), Ltc A.G. O'Brien; 17th Mississippi: Col William D. Holder; 18th Mississippi: Col Thomas M. Griffin; 21st Mississippi: Col D.N. Moody
McLaws' Division; MG Lafayette McLaws	Bryan's Brigade BG Goode Bryan	10th Georgia: Col John B. Weems; 50th Georgia: Col Peter A.S. McGlashan; 51st Georgia: Col Edward Ball; 53rd Georgia: Col James P. Simms
Hood's Division; BG Micah Jenkins	Jenkins' Brigade Col John Bratton	1st South Carolina: Ltc Daniel Livingston; 2nd South Carolina Rifles: Col Thomas Thomson; 5th South Carolina: Col Ashbury Coward; 6th South Carolina: Col John Bratton; Hampton's (South Carolina) Legion: Col Martin W. Gary; Palmetto (South Carolina) Sharpshooters: Col Joseph A. Walker
Hood's Division; BG Micah Jenkins	Law's Brigade BG Evander Law	4th Alabama: Col Pinckney D. Bowles; 15th Alabama: Col William C. Oates; 44th Alabama: Col William F. Perry; 47th Alabama: Col Michael J. Bugler; 48th Alabama: Col James L. Sheffield
Hood's Division; BG Micah Jenkins	Robertson's Brigade BG Jerome B. Robertson	3rd Arkansas: Col Van H. Manning; 1st Texas: Col A.T. Rainey; 4th Texas: Col J.C.G. Key; 5th Texas: Col R.M. Powell
Hood's Division; BG Micah Jenkins	Anderson's Brigade BG George T. Anderson	7th Georgia: Col W.W. White; 8th Georgia: Col John R. Towers; 9th Georgia: Col Benjamin Beck; 11th Georgia: Col Francis Little; 59th Georgia: Col Jack Brown
Hood's Division; BG Micah Jenkins	Benning's Brigade BG Henry Benning	2nd Georgia: Col Edgar M. Butt; 15th Georgia: Col Dudley M. Du Bose; 17th Georgia: Col Wesley C. Hodges; 20th Georgia: Col J.D. Waddell
Buckner's Division; BG Bushrod Johnson	Johnson's Brigade Col John Fulton	17th & 23rd Tennessee: Col R.H. Keeble; 25th & 44th Tennessee: Col John Fulton; 63rd Tennessee: Ltc Abraham Fulkerson
Buckner's Division; BG Bushrod Johnson	Gracie's Brigade BG Archibald Gracie III	41st Alabama: Col Martin L. Stansel; 43rd Alabama: Col Young M. Moody; 1st & 2nd Battalion, Hilliard' Legion: Col John Sanford; 2nd & 4th Battalion, Hilliard's Legion: Col Bolling Hall Jr.
Artillery	Alexander's Battalion Col Edward P. Alexander; Maj Frank Huger	Fickling's (South Carolina) battery: Cpt William W. Fickling; Jordan's (Virginia) battery: Cpt Tyler C. Jordan; Madison Louisiana Light Artillery: Cpt George V. Moody; Parker's (Virginia) battery: Cpt William W. Parker; Taylor's (Virginia) battery: Cpt Osmond B. Taylor; Woolfolk's (Virginia) battery: Cpt Pichegru Woolfolk Jr.

=== Cavalry Corps ===
MG William T. Martin

Division	Brigade	Regiments and Others
First Division; BG John T. Morgan	1st Brigade Col Alfred Russell	1st Alabama: Col William A. Allen; 3rd Alabama: Col James Hagan; 4th Alabama: Col Alfred Russell; 7th Alabama: Col James C. Malone Jr.; 51st Alabama: Maj James T. Dye
First Division; BG John T. Morgan	2nd Brigade Col Charles C. Crews	1st Georgia: Ltc Samuel Davitte; 2nd Georgia: Ltc F.M. Ison; 3rd Georgia: Col R. Thompson; 4th Georgia (Avery's): Ltc William C. Cook; 6th Georgia: Col John R. Hart
First Division; BG John T. Morgan	Artillery	White's (Tennessee) Battery: Lt Arthur Pue Jr.; Wiggins' (Arkansas) Battery: Lt J.P. Bryant
Second Division; BG Frank Armstrong	1st Brigade Col Jacob B. Biffle	4th Tennessee: Col Peril C. Haynes; 8th Tennessee: Col George G. Dibrell; 9th Tennessee: Col Jacob B. Biffle; 10th Tennessee: Ltc Nicholas N. Cox; 11th Tennessee: Col Daniel W. Holman
Second Division; BG Frank Armstrong	2nd Brigade Col Thomas Harrison	3rd Arkansas: Col A.W. Hobson; 8th Texas: Col Thomas Harrison; 11th Texas: Col G.R. Reeves
Second Division; BG Frank Armstrong	Artillery	Huggins' (Tennessee) Battery: Cpt A.L. Huggins
