= 23rd Alabama Sharpshooter Battalion =

Infantry battalion of the Confederate States Army

- Flag of Alabama in 1861 (obverse and reverse)
- Active: November 25, 1863 to April 9, 1865
- Country: Confederate States of America
- Allegiance: Alabama
- Branch: Confederate States Army
- Type: Infantry
- Engagements: American Civil War: Siege of Knoxville; Battle of Bean's Station; Battle of Dandridge; Battle of Chester Station; Battle of Drewry's Bluff; Siege of Petersburg; Battle of the Crater; Battle of Hatcher's Run; Battle of White Oak Road; Battle of Appomattox

Commanders
- Notable commanders: Maj. Nicholas Stallworth

The 23rd Alabama Sharpshooter Battalion was a sharpshooter battalion of the Confederate States Army during the American Civil War. The battalion was formed on November 25, 1863 at Charleston, Tennessee from three companies of the 1st Infantry Battalion, Hilliard's Alabama Legion.

== Service ==
The 23rd Alabama Sharpshooter Battalion served in Gracie's Alabama Brigade in the Department of East Tennessee in late 1863, before being transferred to the Department of Richmond in time for the Bermuda Hundred Campaign . It later served with the Army of Northern Virginia from the Siege of Petersburg to the surrender at Appomattox Courthouse on April 9, 1865.

== See also ==
- List of Confederate units from Alabama
