= 60th Alabama Infantry Regiment =

Infantry regiment of the Confederate States Army

- Flag of Alabama in 1861 (obverse and reverse)
- Active: November 25, 1863 to April 9, 1865
- Country: Confederate States of America
- Allegiance: Alabama
- Branch: Confederate States Army
- Type: Infantry
- Size: Regiment
- Engagements: American Civil War: Siege of Knoxville; Battle of Bean's Station; Battle of Dandridge; Battle of Chester Station; Battle of Drewry's Bluff; Siege of Petersburg; Battle of the Crater; Battle of Hatcher's Run; Battle of White Oak Road; Battle of Appomattox Court House

Commanders
- Notable commanders: Col. John W. A. Sanford

The 60th Alabama Infantry Regiment was an infantry regiment of the Confederate States Army during the American Civil War. The regiment was formed on November 25, 1863, at Charleston, Tennessee by consolidating four companies of the 1st Battalion and the 3rd Battalion, Hilliard's Alabama Legion.

The regiment served in Gracie's Alabama Brigade in the Department of East Tennessee and later the Army of Northern Virginia.

The regiment surrendered at Appomattox Courthouse on April 9, 1865.

== See also ==
- List of Confederate units from Alabama
