= 59th Alabama Infantry Regiment =

Infantry regiment of the Confederate States Army

- Flag of Alabama in 1861 (obverse and reverse)
- Active: November 25, 1863 to April 9, 1865
- Country: Confederate States of America
- Allegiance: Alabama
- Branch: Confederate States Army
- Type: Infantry
- Engagements: American Civil War: Siege of Knoxville; Battle of Chickamauga; Battle of Bean's Station; Battle of Dandridge; Battle of Chester Station; Battle of Drewry's Bluff; Siege of Petersburg; Battle of the Crater; Battle of Hatcher's Run; Battle of White Oak Road; Battle of Appomattox Court House

Commanders
- Notable commanders: Col. Balling Hall III.

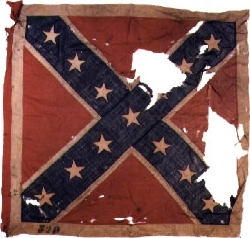
59th Alabama Infantry Regiment Flag

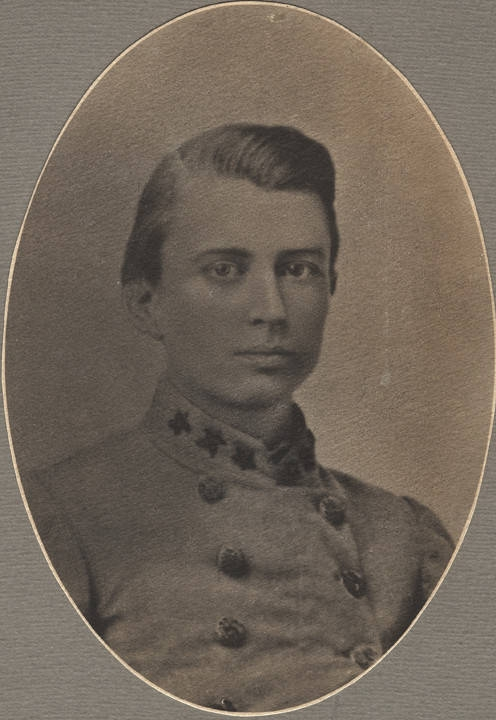
Col. Bolling Hall III

The 59th Alabama Infantry Regiment was an infantry regiment of the Confederate States Army during the American Civil War.

== Organization ==
The regiment was formed on November 25, 1863 at Charleston, Tennessee by consolidating the 2nd Infantry and the 4th Artillery Battalions, Hilliard's Alabama Legion.

== Service ==
The regiment served in Gracie's Alabama Brigade in the Department of East Tennessee participating in Longstreets Knoxville Campaign and later the Army of Northern Virginia in the Siege of Petersburg. During the latter campaign, the Regiment lost its battle flag during the Battle of Hatcher's Run in February 1865, but the regiment went on to surrender at Appomattox Courthouse on April 9, 1865.

== Staff officers ==
- Colonel Bolling Hall III.
- Lieut. Colonel John D. McLennan
- Lieut. Colonel Geo. W. Huguley
- Major Geo. W. Huguley
- Major Lewis H. Crumpler
- Lt. Crenshaw Hall, adjutant

== Field officers ==
- John C. Hendrix
- S. E. A. Reaves
- John F. Wise
- CJohn E. Hall
- W. Dillard
- John Porter.
- E. L. McIntyre
- John A. Henley.
- W. H. Stuckey
- W. J. Peacock.
- L. H. Crumpier
- W.R. Davie
- James Lang
- R. Glasgow
- Louis Harrell
- H. H. Rutledge
- Zach. Daniel
- R. F. Manly
- W. D. Walden
- R. H. Gulledge.

== See also ==
- List of Confederate units from Alabama
