= Archibald Gracie (disambiguation) =

Archibald Gracie (1755–1829) was a merchant in New York.

Archibald Gracie may also refer to:

- Archibald Gracie III (1832–1864), Confederate general
- Archibald Gracie IV (1859–1912), American writer and survivor of the Titanic
