= Knoxville campaign order of battle =

The order of battle for the Knoxville campaign includes:

- Knoxville campaign order of battle: Confederate
- Knoxville campaign order of battle: Union
