= 6th Alabama Cavalry Regiment =

- Flag of Alabama in 1861
- Active: Early 1863 to May 1865
- Country: Confederate States of America
- Allegiance: Confederate States Army
- Branch: Cavalry
- Engagements: American Civil War: Atlanta campaign; Battle of Ten Island Ford; Battle of Bluff Springs; Battle of Fort Blakeley

The 6th Alabama Cavalry Regiment was a cavalry unit of the Confederate States Army during the American Civil War.

== Service ==
The 6th Alabama Cavalry Regiment was organized near Pine Level early in 1863, This regiment was part of a brigade commanded by Brigadier-General James Holt Clanton (1827–1871), a Montgomery attorney who had served as a U.S. Army private in the Mexican War during 1848. In November 1861 Clanton had raised and commanded the 1st Alabama Cavalry as a Colonel, a regiment that served with distinction at the bloody Battle of Shiloh (April 1862). Clanton's new brigade included not only the 6th but also the 7th Alabama Cavalry, the 57th and 61st Alabama Infantry, and two batteries of artillery.

First posted to the south Alabama town of Pollard, Clanton and his brigade were ordered to north Alabama in February 1864. They would be headquartered at Gadsden in Etowah County on the east bank of the Coosa River with their mission being to protect the coal and iron sections in that area, protect the public works at Selma, and to organize and complete the 8th Alabama Cavalry. By this time the 6th Cavalry had already moved to Meridian, MS but was ordered to rejoin Clanton in Gadsden. The 6th was subsequently involved in several skirmishes with elements of the Federal XV and XIV Corps near Decatur, Danville and the Paint Rock River with small loss.

In the savage fighting of the Atlanta-Dalton campaign in May–June 1864 the regiment lost quite a number of men during the several weeks they were attached as part of Ferguson's and Armstrong's brigades.

In June 1864 Maj. Gen. Lovell Rousseau was ordered by Gen. Sherman to start from Nashville and move south. Units to be under his command included the 8th Indiana, 2nd Kentucky, 4th Tennessee, 9th Ohio, and 5th Iowa cavalry regiments. Most of this cavalry, except the 4th Tennessee, were dismounted due to the difficulty in obtaining horses so Rousseau was forced to take horses from other regiments. Also, accompanying General Rousseau were guns from the 1st Michigan Artillery. This command was to move through Decatur and to move slowly to Blountsville and Ashville. And, if the way was clear, to cross the Coosa River at the Ten Island Ford or the railroad bridge with the ultimate goal of breaking up the Montgomery and West Point Railroad between Tuskegee and Opelika. When hearing of the approach of the Union troops Clanton moved with Lieutenant Colonel Washington T. Lary and the 6th Alabama Cavalry toward Greensport and positioned his troops. The resulting fighting was disastrous for General Clanton and his valiant men, particularly the 6th Alabama Cavalry. Lieutenant Colonel Lary and his executive officer, Major E.A. McWhorter were captured.

Transferred to West Florida, the 6th fought Maj. Gen. Frederick Steele's column at Bluff Springs and Lt. Col. Andrew Spurling's column at Milton with many prisoners taken.

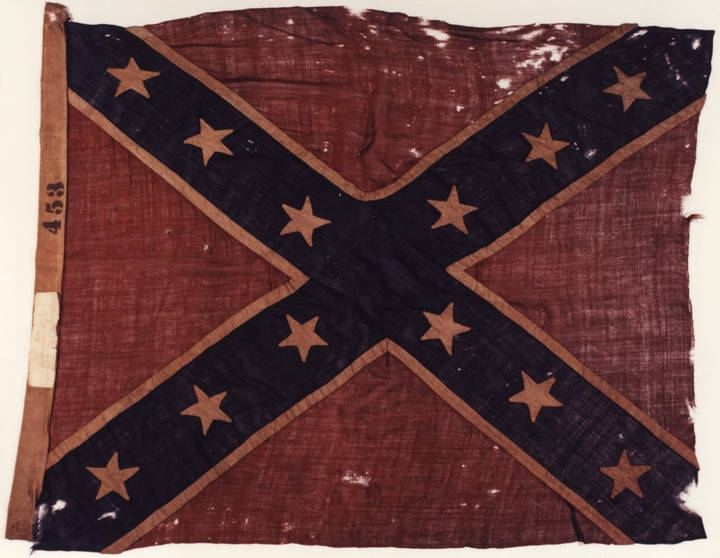
6th Alabama Cavalry flag

The flag of the 6th Alabama Cavalry was captured on March 25, 1865, by Private Thomas Riley, Co. D, 1st Louisiana Cavalry during an engagement which took place between Canoe Creek, Alabama and the Escambia River prior to the Battle of Fort Blakeley. Private Riley was recommended for and received the Medal of Honor. The flag was forwarded to the U.S. War Department where it was assigned Capture Number 453. The flag and its staff were returned to the State of Alabama effective April 26, 1905. This flag received conservation treatment and was prepared for display by Textile Preservation Associates, Inc. of Sharpsburg, MD in March 1999. There are many references of a Rudolph Riddell with the 61st New York capturing the flag of the 6th Alabama Cavalry on April 6, 1864, at the Battle of Sailor's Creek during the Appomattox Campaign, in Virginia. There is no record of this Alabama Cavalry regiment ever being in Virginia but the brigade facing these New York troops included the 6th Alabama Infantry. That probably was the unit that should have been referenced in the Medal of Honor citation.

At the end of the war the remnant of the 6th fought Maj. Gen. James H. Wilson's column and laid down their arms at Gainesville, AL, fewer than 200 men.

== See also ==
- List of Confederate units from Alabama
