= Battle of Chester Station =

Battle of the American Civil War

Coordinates: 37°21′10.3″N 77°24′44.1″W

Action at Chester Station
- Part of the American Civil War
Date	May 10, 1864
Location	Chester; Chesterfield County, Virginia
Result	Inconclusive

Belligerents
United States (Union)	(Confederate States of America) CSA (Confederacy)

Commanders and leaders
Benjamin Butler	P. G. T. Beauregard

Strength
3,400	2,000

Casualties and losses
280	249

The Battle of Chester Station was fought on May 10, 1864, between Union and Confederate forces during the American Civil War. The Confederates attacked portions of Benjamin Butler's Union forces.

== Background ==
The Action at Chester Station was a relatively minor battle of the Bermuda Hundred Campaign and ended indecisively. It started as a Union expedition against the Richmond & Petersburg Railroad. The object was to destroy the railroad in order to cut the line of communication. It was met by a reconnaissance-in-force of two Confederate brigades led by Major General Robert Ransom, who attacked south from Drewry's Bluff near the Winfree House. Both sides fought gallantly and fiercely including hand-to-hand.

== Battle ==
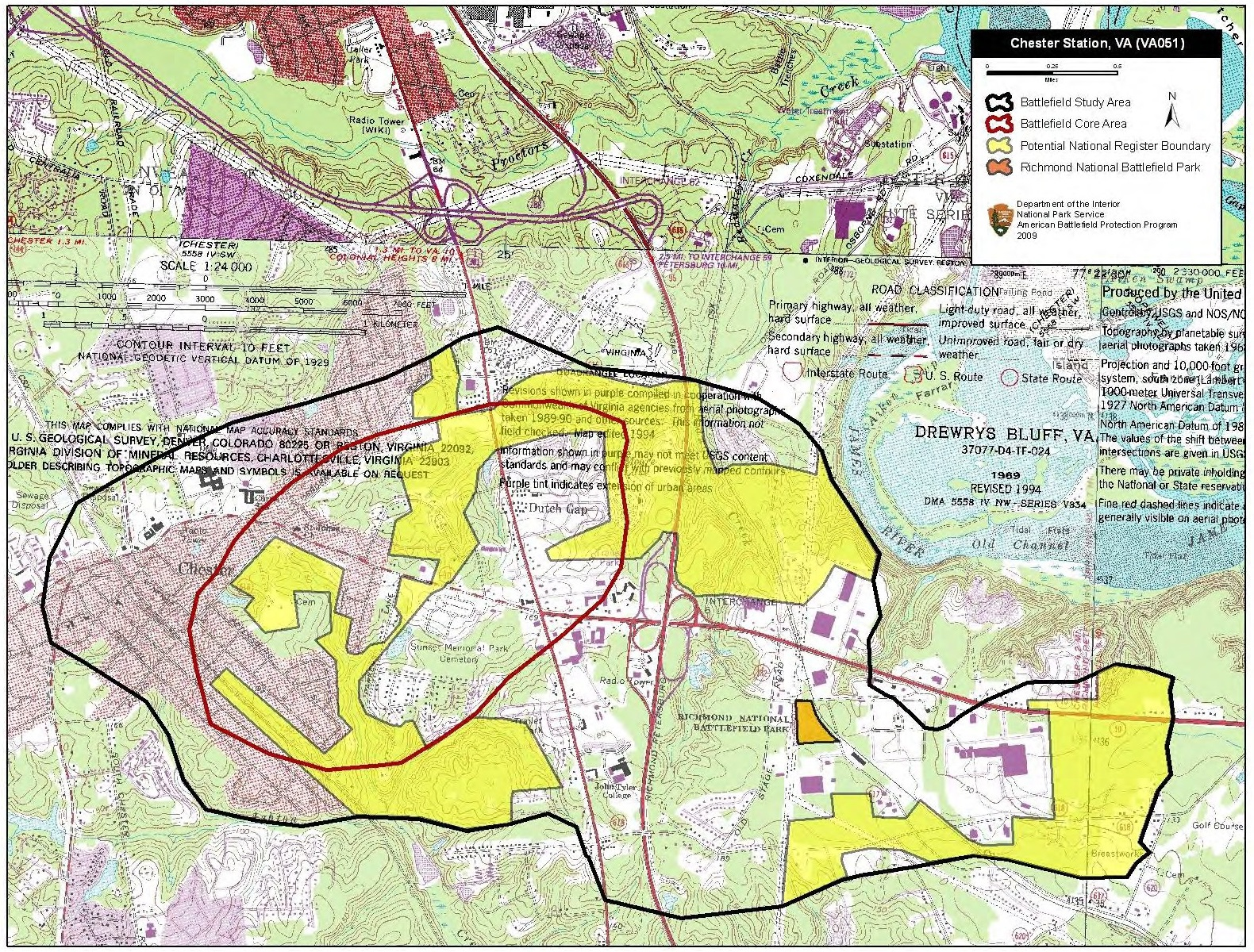
Map of Chester Station Battlefield core and study areas by the American Battlefield Protection Program.

When the Federal (Union) troops reached the vicinity of Chester Station they were divided into two wings. The left wing, commanded by Maj. O. S. Sanford of the 7th Connecticut Infantry, moved up the railroad toward Chester Station, where the 6th Connecticut Infantry was engaged in tearing up the track, and remained there for about an hour, when orders came to join the other column on the turnpike below. Here the right wing, commanded by Col. C. J. Dobbs of the 13th Indiana Infantry, had encountered a force of Confederates too large to overcome, and Dobbs sent back for reinforcements. In the meantime he formed line of battle with his own regiment on the left, the 169th New York Infantry on the right, one section of the 1st Connecticut battery in front, supported by a detachment of the 67th Ohio Infantry, and awaited the onset. The Confederates, with infantry, cavalry and artillery, advanced, and when they were within easy range Dobbs gave the command to fire. A tremendous volley from his entire line checked the Confederate advance, and a second threw them into confusion, compelling them to retire for the purpose of reforming their lines. At this juncture Sanford arrived with the left wing and went into position with the 6th Connecticut Infantry on the right of the road and the 7th on the left as supports to the advanced lines. Two companies of the 7th Connecticut Infantry were sent forward to support a battery, and the remainder of the regiment moved up to the top of the hill and opened fire on the Confederate's left, driving them back to the woods. One of the guns of the 4th New Jersey battery was abandoned by the men, and an effort to capture this piece was thwarted by this regiment, Sanford sending Lieut. Barker with Co. K to bring in the gun, which he did in the face of a galling fire. The 7th New Hampshire Infantry came up and went into position just as the Confederates advanced again, having been reinforced, and again they were allowed to come within easy range, when they were greeted with a murderous fire from both artillery and infantry. This settled the contest. After a vain endeavor to rally the shattered ranks the Confederate officers gave up the attempt and sought the cover of the woods. Gen. A. H. Terry, commanding the 1st division, 10th corps, arrived on the field after the action had begun, and during the latter part of the engagement directed the movements of the Union troops.

To add to these difficulties the woods were fired early in the action, and the smoke and flames driving into our lines blinded us and deranged the precision of movements.

— Brig. Gen. Seth Barton C.S.A.

== Aftermath ==
Gen. Terry reported the Union loss as being 280 in killed, wounded and missing, and estimated that of the Confederates as at least twice that number, some 50 prisoners remaining in the hands of the Federals.

The return of casualties in Barton's Brigade showed a total of 249 in killed, wounded and missing, including the loss of a commanding officer of one of his regiments, Lt. Col. Joseph R. Cabell of the 38th Virginia Infantry.

Two Confederate brigades faced an Ohio regiment, which was pushed back despite arrival of reinforcements from Drake's brigade. Confederate successes, while they had superior numbers, including the capture of one cannon (which was recovered by the Union forces), were halted when Hawley's brigade arrived on the field. The growing Union reinforcements started to outnumber them, and they were compelled to retire to Drewry's Bluff, while at the same time the Federals withdrew east to Bermuda Hundred. The result was a draw with neither side having surrendered, been defeated, or gained any ground. The Union forces succeeded in destroying some railroad track, and the Confederate forces succeeded in stopping them from doing any more damage. Maj. Gen. Ransom relieved Brig. Gen. Barton of his command, and Col. Alvin C. Voris was brevetted Brigadier General for meritorious service.

== Order of battle ==
=== Union Forces ===
Department of Virginia and North Carolina
MG Benjamin F. Butler

MG Quincy A. Gillimore, commanding X Corps

Division	Brigade	Regiments and Others
1st Division, X Corps; BG Alfred H. Terry	1st Brigade	67th Ohio Infantry: Col Alvin C. Voris; 1st Connecticut Battery, Light Artillery: Cpt Alfred P. Rockwell
1st Division, X Corps; BG Alfred H. Terry	2nd Brigade Col Joseph R. Hawley	6th Connecticut Infantry: Col Redfield Duryee; 7th Connecticut Infantry: Maj Oliver S. Sanford; 7th New Hampshire Infantry: Ltc Thomas A. Henderson; 11th Maine Infantry
1st Division, XVIII corps	1st Brigade Col Jeremiah C. Drake	13th Indiana Infantry: Col Cyrus J. Dobbs; 112th New York Infantry; 169th New York Infantry: Col John McConihe; 4th New Jersey Battery, Light Artillery: Lt John H. George
	Cavalry	2nd U.S. Colored Cavalry (dismounted): Col George W. Cole

=== Confederate Forces ===
Department of North Carolina and Southern Virginia
GEN P.G.T. Beauregard

MG Robert Ransom, commanding Department of Richmond

Brigade	Regiments and Others
Barton's Brigade BG Seth M. Barton	9th Virginia Infantry: Col James J. Phillips; 14th Virginia Infantry: Col William White; 38th Virginia Infantry: Ltc Joseph R. Cabell (k), Cpt George K. Griggs; 53rd Virginia Infantry: Col William R. Aylett; 57th Virginia Infantry: Col Clement R. Fontaine
Gracie's Brigade BG Archibald Gracie	41st Alabama Infantry; 43d Alabama Infantry; 59th Alabama Infantry; 60th Alabama Infantry

== See also ==
- Bermuda Hundred Campaign
