= Barbour Alabama Light Artillery Battery =

- Flag of Alabama in 1861 (obverse and reverse)
- Active: April 30, 1862 to April, 1865
- Country: Confederate States of America
- Allegiance: Alabama
- Branch: Confederate States Army
- Type: Artillery
- Engagements: Battle of Chickamauga; Battle of Chattanooga; Atlanta Campaign; Tullahoma Campaign; Battle of Chickamauga; Battle of Chattanooga; Battle of New Hope Church; Battle of Allatoona; Battle of Nashville

Commanders
- Captain: Wiliam N. Reeves
- Captain: R.F. Kolb

The Barbour Alabama Light Artillery Battery was an artillery battery from Alabama serving in the Confederate States Army during the American Civil War. The battery was also known as Kolb's Battery.

== Organization and service ==
The Barbour Alabama Light Artillery Battery was organized as Company C, 4th Artillery Battalion, Hilliard's Alabama Legion in April 1862 and entered Confederate service at Eufaula, Alabama later that month. It served in the Department of East Tennessee as part of Hilliard's Alabama Legion, but was soon separated as was common for artillery units in Legions serving in the Confederacy.

It was part of the Reserve Artillery Battalion of Buckner's Division in the Army of Tennessee from August to November 1863. Armed with two 6 pound and two 12 pound smoothbores on March 29, 1864 before the Atlanta Campaign and served in William's Artillery Battalion until September 1864. Assigned to Storr's Artillery Battalion, French Division, Stewart's Corps during Hoods Tennessee Campaign.

The Battery surrendered at Augusta, Georgia as part of the District of Georgia in April, 1865.

== See also ==
- List of Confederate units from Alabama
