= Hilliard's Legion =

Hilliard's Alabama Legion
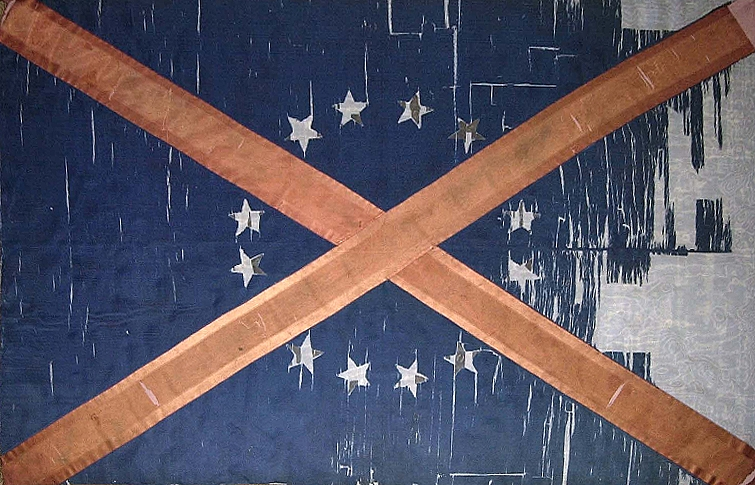
- The Legion's flag
- Active: June 25, 1862 to November 25, 1863
- Country: Confederate States of America
- Allegiance: Alabama
- Branch: Confederate States Army
- Type: Combined
- Engagements: Cumberland Gap; Battle of Chickamauga; Siege of Chattanooga

Commanders
- Colonel: Henry W. Hilliard
- Colonel: A. H. Bradford
- Colonel: Jack Thorington

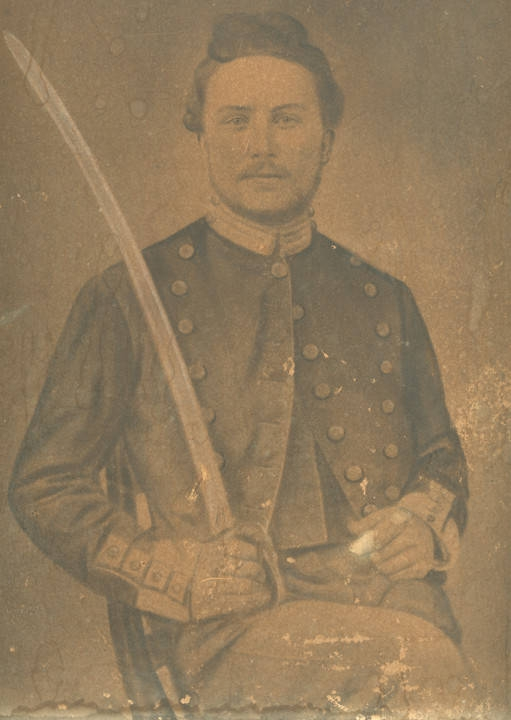
Charles Horton Morgan, who enlisted as a private in Company A, 1st Battalion, Hilliard's Legion

Hilliard's Legion or Hilliard's Alabama Legion was a Confederate unit which fought in the American Civil War. Unlike most Civil War formations, it was a combined arms force, with infantry, cavalry and artillery components.

== History ==
On April 24, 1862, Henry W. Hilliard was made a colonel and authorized to raise a legion, consisting of the 1st, 2nd and 3rd Battalions (infantry), 4th Battalion (artillery) and 5th Battalion (cavalry). It was organized in Montgomery, Alabama, on June 25 of that year, with a strength of almost 3000 men. The cavalry battalion eventually was detached and assigned to the 10th Confederate Cavalry Regiment; and Company C, 4th Artillery Battalion, was separated as the Barbour Light Artillery.

The Legion was sent to eastern Tennessee to participate in the ultimately successful siege of Cumberland Gap. Hilliard resigned on December 1, 1862. Lieutenant Colonel Jack Thorington, commander of the 1st Battalion, was promoted to colonel and placed in charge. In April 1863, the unit was attached to General Gracie's Brigade and fought in the Battle of Chickamauga, where it suffered heavy losses: 45% of its 902 men. In the 1st Battalion alone, 169 of 239 soldiers were either killed or wounded.

On November 25, the Legion was disbanded at Charleston, Tennessee, and the remaining men reassigned to the 59th and 60th Alabama Regiments. The 2nd Battalion and the 4th Artillery Battalion became the 59th Alabama. Four companies of the 1st Battalion and the 3rd Battalion became the 60th Alabama, and the remaining three companies of the 1st Battalion became the 23rd Alabama Battalion Sharpshooters.

== See also ==
- List of Confederate units from Alabama
- List of American Civil War legions
