= 61st Alabama Infantry Regiment =

Infantry regiment of the Confederate States Army

- Flag of Alabama in 1861 (obverse and reverse)
- Active: May 2, 1863 to April 9, 1865
- Country: Confederate States of America
- Allegiance: Alabama
- Branch: Confederate States Army
- Type: Infantry
- Engagements: American Civil War: Battle of the Wilderness; Battle of Spotsylvania; Battle of North Anna; Battle of Cold Harbor; Valley Campaigns of 1864; Battle of Monocacy; Third Battle of Winchester; Battle of Fisher's Hill; Battle of Cedar Creek; Siege of Petersburg; Battle of Fort Stedman; Battle of Appomattox Court House

Commanders
- Notable commanders: Col. William G. Swanson

The 61st Alabama Infantry Regiment was an infantry regiment of the Confederate States Army regiment during the American Civil War. The regiment was composed of nine companies from the southern parts of Alabama.

== Organization and service ==
The regiment was formed at Pollard, Alabama on May 2, 1863 as a battalion with nine companies, and attached to the Department of the Gulf.

It was increased to a regiment on April 11, 1864 and shortly after sent to Virginia, where it was placed Battle's Brigade, Rodes Division, II Corps, Army of Northern Virginia. The transfer was a compensation for the 26th Alabama of that brigade, who had been sent on detached duty in February 1864 to convey prisoners to Andersonville, but did not return.

The regiment served with that brigade in the Army of Northern Virginia and the Valley District, until the surrender at Appomattox Courthouse on April 9, 1865.

== See also ==
- List of Confederate units from Alabama
