= Robert Sanford Foster =

American Union Army general (1834–1903)

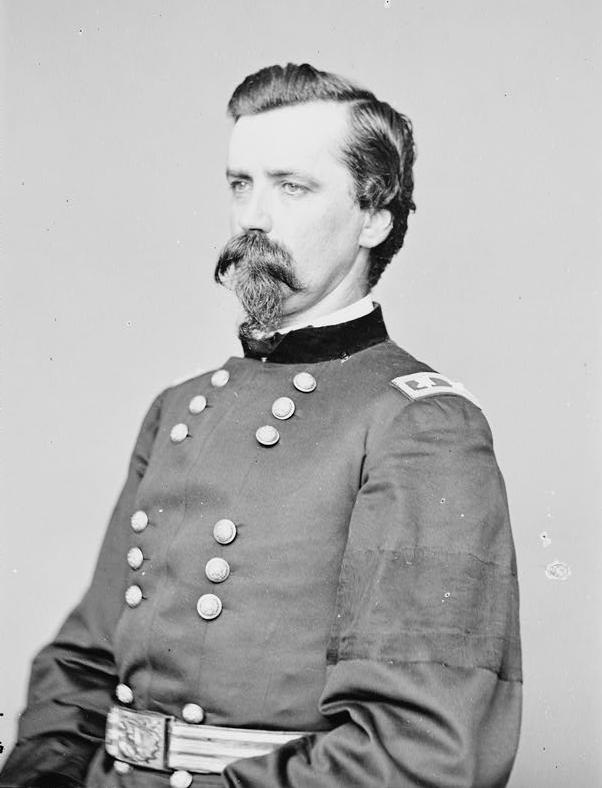
- Born: January 27, 1834; Vernon, Indiana, US
- Died: March 3, 1903 (aged 69); Crown Hill Cemetery and Artoretum Section 15, Lot 11
- Burial place: Crown Hill Cemetery and Arboretum; 39.8185117°N 86.175001°W
- Military career
- Allegiance: United States of America; Union
- Branch: United States Army; Union Army
- Service years: 1861–1865
- Rank: Brigadier General; Brevet Major General
- Nickname: "Sandy"
- Commands: 13th Indiana Volunteer Infantry Regiment
- Conflicts: American Civil War; Battle of Rich Mountain; First Battle of Winchester; Battle of Port Republic; Siege of Suffolk; Siege of Charleston Harbor; Bermuda Hundred Campaign; First Battle of Deep Bottom; Second Battle of Deep Bottom; Battle of New Market Heights; Battle of Fort Gregg; Battle of Appomattox Court House
- Other work: U.S. Marshal

Robert Sanford Foster (January 27, 1834 – March 3, 1903) was an American officer. He served as a Union general during the American Civil War. He played a prominent role in the siege of Petersburg and the Appomattox Campaign.

After the assassination of President Abraham Lincoln in April 1865, Foster was selected later that year to serve as a member of the Military Commission established to try the conspirators accused of the murder. He resigned from the Army in September 1865 and returned to Indianapolis, Indiana, where he lived and worked for the rest of his life. He served for a period as a US Marshal.

== Biography ==
Foster was born in Vernon, Indiana in 1834. He had three brothers, Wallace Foster (who later became a captain in the Civil War), Chapin Foster, and Edgar J Foster. He moved to Indianapolis, where he first worked in the grocery store of an uncle. He also learned the trade of being a tinner. His brothers also moved to the city, and lived there the rest of their lives.

=== Marriage and family ===
He married on May 1, 1861, to Margaret R. Foust, also of Indianapolis. A week later, Foster left for the war. The couple had two children together, Clarence Foster (who later lived in Chicago) and a daughter, who died in September 1898, from an accident.

At the onset of the Civil War, Foster had enlisted as a private of Indiana volunteers. He was quickly promoted to captain in Lew Wallace's 11th Indiana Infantry Regiment and saw action at the Battle of Rich Mountain in western Virginia.

Following these battles, he was transferred to the 13th Regiment Indiana Infantry as major and shortly after promoted to colonel on April 30, 1862. Foster led his regiment during Stonewall Jackson's Valley Campaign of 1862 until his regiment was transferred to southeast Virginia in the vicinity of Suffolk.

Foster took command of a brigade in John J. Peck's division at Suffolk. When Confederate General James Longstreet threatened Suffolk in 1863, Peck's garrison was increased to the size of three divisions. Foster commanded the 2nd Brigade in Michael Corcoran's 1st Division. During the subsequent Siege of Suffolk, Foster's brigade manned the southwest front of the city's defenses. Following the lifting of the siege, Foster was promoted to brigadier general of volunteers on June 12, 1863.

Foster was transferred to Quincy A. Gillmore's X Corps near Charleston, South Carolina. Foster commanded the 1st Brigade of the Union forces on Folly Island during the siege of Charleston Harbor. During the early part of 1864, Foster commanded a brigade, then division in Florida.

When Gillmore's corps was transferred to southeast Virginia, Foster was placed in command of the 1st Division, X Corps. During the Bermuda Hundred Campaign, Foster served as chief of staff to Gillmore. He returned to command the 1st Division briefly before reverting to brigade command. He led his brigade during the first and second battles of Deep Bottom. He commanded the 2nd Division, X Corps at the Battle of New Market Heights.

During the winter of 1864/1865, the Army of the James was reorganized, and Foster was placed in command of the 1st Division of the XXIV Corps, now under the command of John Gibbon. Foster notably led his division in an assault on Fort Gregg during the Union breakthrough at Petersburg. Foster's division was part of the Union force that blocked Robert E. Lee's line of retreat at Appomattox Court House, leading to the Confederate surrender there. Foster was brevetted to major general of U.S. volunteers on March 13, 1865.

After the culmination of fighting, Foster was selected to serve as a member of the Military Commission in 1865 that tried the Lincoln Conspirators in the case of President Lincoln's assassination. Secretary of War Edward M. Stanton and the Judge Advocate General, Joseph Holt agreed that the assassination and related attack on the Secretary of State were acts of war.

After this service, Foster resigned from the army in September 1865.

== Later life ==
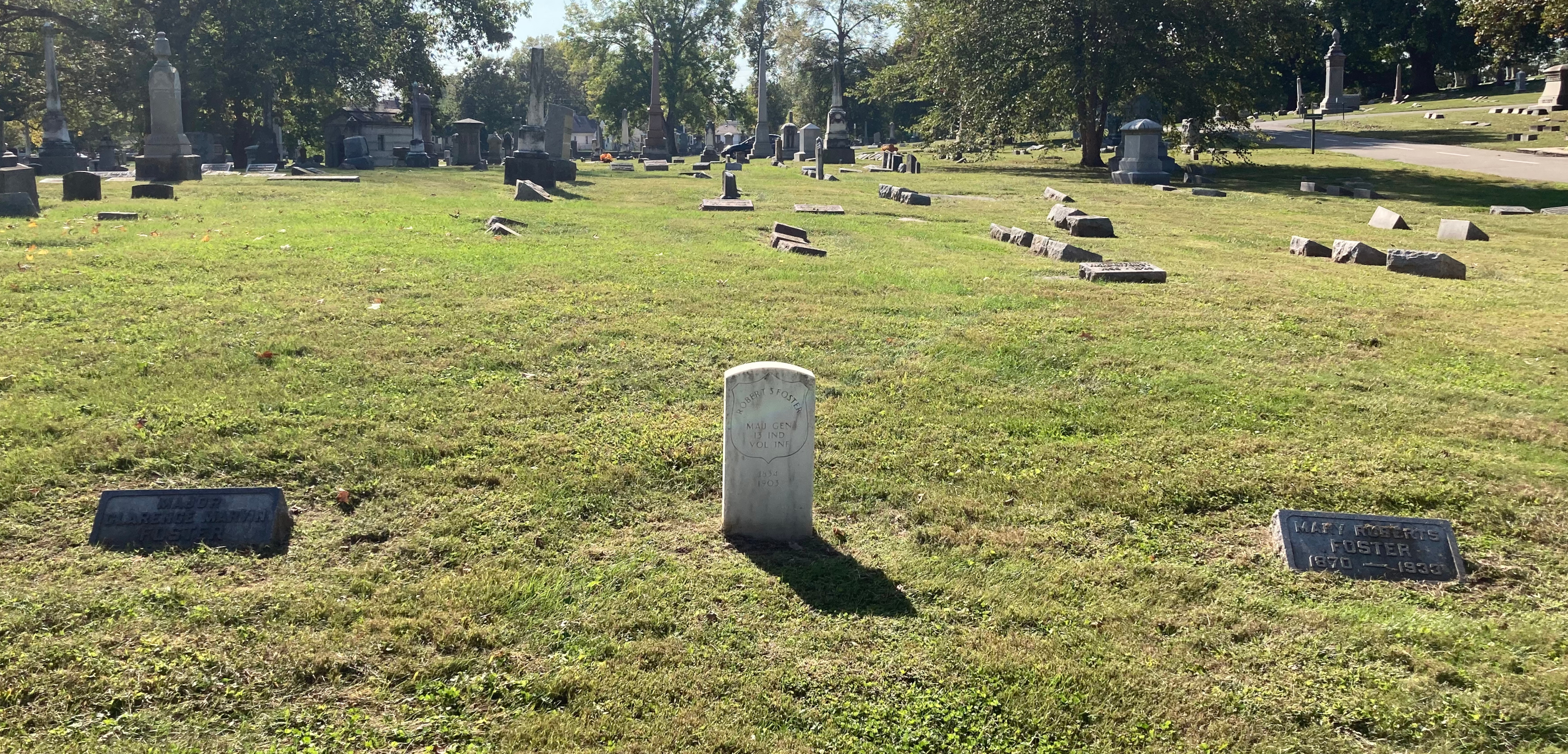
Foster's grave at Crown Hill Cemetery

Foster returned to Indiana after the war, settling in Indianapolis with his family. He became very active in various civil and fraternal organizations, was elected to local office, and served in state appointee posts: he served as an elected alderman; as city treasurer; and as president of the Board of Trade for several years.

He was appointed as a United States Marshal under Presidents Garfield and Arthur for the district of Indiana. He was appointed by the Governor of Indiana as a director of the Northern Prison, and as Quartermaster-General of the National Guard of Indiana. Foster died in Indianapolis in 1903, and was buried at Crown Hill Cemetery.
