= 13th Indiana Infantry Regiment =

13th Indiana Volunteer Infantry Regiment
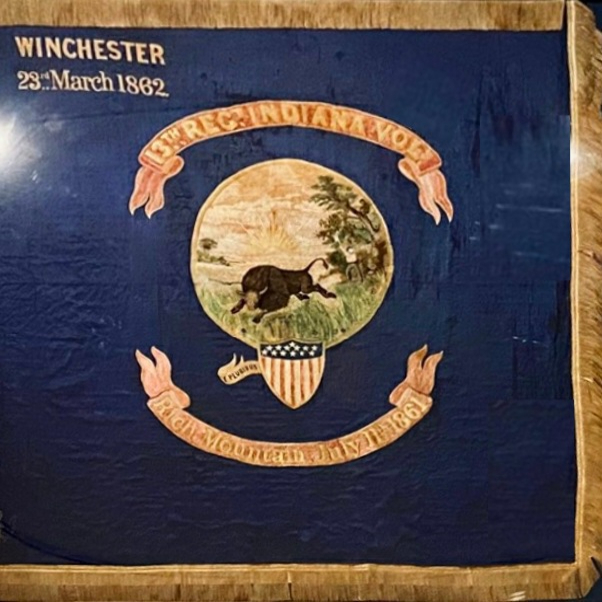
- Regimental battle flag of the 13th Indiana Infantry Regiment at the Indiana War Memorial Museum
- Active: June 19, 1861, to September 5, 1865
- Country: United States
- Allegiance: Union
- Branch: Infantry
- Engagements: Battle of Rich Mountain; Battle of Cheat Mountain; Battle of Greenbrier River; Battle of Camp Allegheny; First Battle of Kernstown; Battle of Port Republic; Joint Expedition Against Franklin; Siege of Suffolk; Second Battle of Charleston Harbor; Battle of Port Walthall Junction; Battle of Swift Creek; Battle of Chester Station; Battle of Drewry's Bluff; Battle of Cold Harbor; Siege of Petersburg; Battle of the Crater; Second Battle of Deep Bottom; Battle of Chaffin's Farm; Battle of Fair Oaks & Darbytown Road; First Battle of Fort Fisher; Second Battle of Fort Fisher; Battle of Wilmington; Carolinas campaign

The 13th Indiana Infantry Regiment was an infantry regiment in the Union Army during the American Civil War.

== Service ==
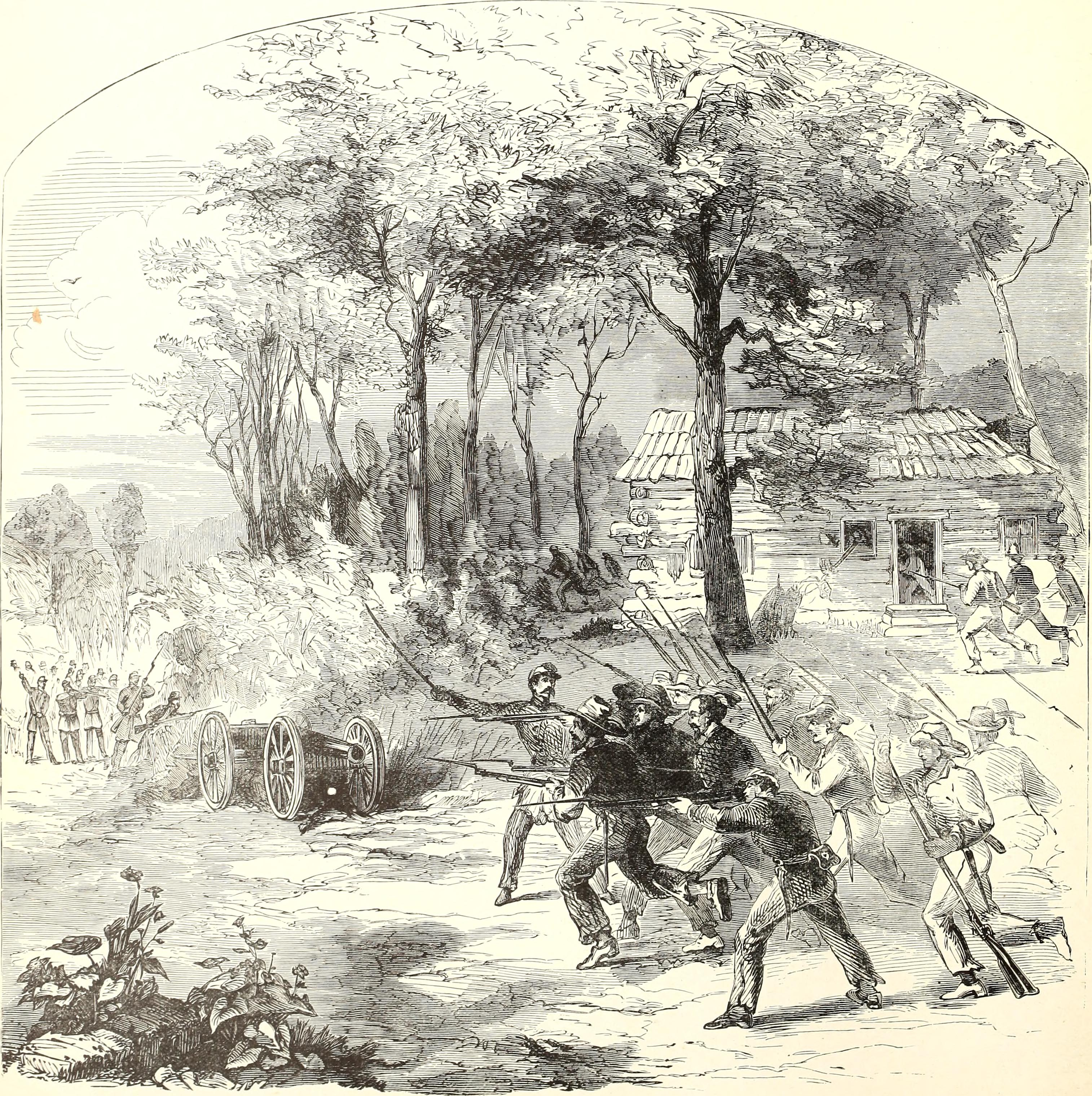
The Thirteenth Indiana Regiment capturing a gun at the Battle of Rich Mountain, 1861

The 13th Indiana Volunteer Infantry Regiment was originally accepted for state service for one year and was organized at Indianapolis for the U.S. service by volunteers from the companies in camp. It was one of the first four regiments volunteering from the state for three years and was mustered on June 19, 1861.

Attached to Rosecrans' Brigade, McClellan's Army of West Virginia, July 1861. 1st Brigade, Army of Occupation, West Virginia, to September 1861. Reynolds' Cheat Mountain Brigade, West Virginia, to November 1861. Milroy's Command, Cheat Mountain District, West Virginia, to January 1862. 2nd Brigade, Landers' Division, to March 1862. 2nd Brigade, Shields' 2nd Division, Banks' V Corps and Department of the Shenandoah to May 1862. 2nd Brigade, Shields' Division, Department of the Rappahannock, to July 1862. Ferry's 2nd Brigade, 2nd Division, IV Corps, Army of the Potomac, to September 1862. Ferry's Brigade, Division at Suffolk, Virginia, VII Corps, Department of Virginia, September 1862. Foster's Provisional Brigade, Division at Suffolk, VII Corps, to April 1863. 2nd Brigade, 1st Division, VII Corps, to July, 1863. 1st Brigade, Vogdes' Division, Folly Island, South Carolina, X Corps, Department of the South, to January 1864. 1st Brigade, Vogdes Division, Folly Island, South Carolina, Northern District, Department of the South, to February 1864. 1st Brigade, Vogdes' Division, District of Florida, to April 1864. 2nd Brigade, 3rd Division, X Corps, Army of the James, Department of Virginia and North Carolina, to May 1864. 2nd Brigade, 3rd Division, XVIII Corps, to June 1864. 3rd Brigade, 2nd Division, X Corps, to December 1864. 3rd Brigade, 2nd Division, XXIV Corps, to January 1865. 3rd Brigade, 2nd Division, Terry's Provisional Corps, Department of North Carolina, to March 1865. 3rd Brigade, 2nd Division, X Corps, Department of North Carolina, to September 1865.

== Detailed service ==
The 13th Indiana Infantry Regiment left Indiana for West Virginia July 4. Subsequent activity is as follows:

July 7–17, 1861: Campaign in West Virginia

July 11: Battle of Rich Mountain

July 13: Moved to Beverly, then to Cheat Mountain Pass

September 11–17: Operations on Cheat Mountain

September 12: Cheat Mountain Pass

October 3–4: Greenbrier River

October 29-November 7: Scouting Expedition through the Kanawha District

December 11–14: Expedition to Camp Baldwin

December 13: Action at Camp Allegheny

December 18: Moved to Green Springs Run

until March 1862: Duty at Green Springs Run

January 1–4: Skirmishes at Bath, Hancock, Great Cacapon Bridge, Alpine Station and Sir John's Run

March 5–15: Advance on Winchester, VA

March 22: Kernstown .

March 23: Battle of Winchester

April 17: Occupation of Mt. Jackson

May 7: Summerville Heights

May 12–21: March to Fredericksburg

May 25–30: return to Front Royal

June 9: Battle of Port Republic

June 29-July 2: Moved to the Peninsula, VA

until August 16: Harrison's Landing

August 16–23: Moved to Fortress Monroe

August 30 - June 27, 1863: Suffolk, VA

October 3, 1862: Reconnaissance to Franklin on the Blackwater

October 3: Franklin

December 12: Zuni Minor's Ford

January 8–10, 1863: Expedition toward Blackwater

January 30: Action at Deserted House

April 4: Leesville

April 12-May 4: Siege of Suffolk

April 13: Edenton, Providence Church and Somerton Roads

April 17: Suffolk

April 24: Edenton Road

May 4: Siege of Suffolk raised

May 20: Foster's Plantation

June 24-July 7: Dix's Peninsula Campaign

July 1–7: Expedition from White House to South Anna Bridge

July 4: South Anna Bridge

July 28-August 3: Moved to Folly Island, SC

until February 1864: Siege operations against Fort Wagner, Morris Island and against Fort Sumpter and Charleston, SC

September 7, 1863: Capture of Forts Wagner and Gregg

October 1863, to February 1864: Stationed at Folly Island

December 1863: Reenlisted

February 23, 1864: Moved to Jacksonville, FL

until April 17: Duty at Jacksonville, FL

May 4–28: Ordered to Hilton Head, SC; then to Gloucester Point, VA. Butler's operations on Southside of the James River and against Petersburg and Richmond, Va., .

May 5: Occupation of Bermuda Hundred

May 6–7: Port Walthal Junction

May 9–10: Swift Creek

May 10: Chester Station

May 12–16: Operations against Fort Darling

May 14–16: Battle of Drewry's Bluff

May 16–28: Bermuda Hundred

May 28-June 1: Moved to White House, then to Cold Harbor

June 1–12: Battles about Cold Harbor

June 15–18: before Petersburg

June 16 to December 6: Siege operations against Petersburg and Richmond

July 30, 1864: Mine Explosion, Petersburg

June 19: Non-Veterans left front

June 24, 1864: Mustered out

August 13–20: Demonstration north of the James at Deep Bottom .

August 14–18: Battle of Strawberry Plains

September 28–30: Chaffin's Farm, New Market Heights

October 27–28: Battle of Fair Oaks

November 4–17: Detached duty at New York City during Election of 1864

December 7–27: Expedition to Fort Fisher, NC

January 3–15, 1865: 2nd Expedition to Fort Fisher, NC

January 15: Assault and capture of Fort Fisher

February 19–20: Town Creek

February 22: Capture of Wilmington

March 1-April 26: Campaign of the Carolinas

March 6–21: Advance on Goldsboro

March 21: Occupation of Goldsboro

April 10–14: Advance on Raleigh

April 14: Occupation of Raleigh

April 26: Bennett's House

Surrender of Johnston and his army.

until September: Duty at various points in North Carolina

September 5, 1865: Mustered out

== Casualties ==
The original strength of the regiment was 1,047. Gain by recruits, 192; reenlistments, 148; unassigned recruits, 40; total, 1,427. The loss of death, 136; desertion, 103; unaccounted for 25. At its reorganization, the original strength was 980. Gain by recruits, 166; total 1,146. The loss of death, 98; desertion, 1; unaccounted for, 30.

The 13th Indiana Infantry lost during service 3 officers and 104 enlisted men killed and mortally wounded and 2 officers and 146 enlisted men by disease. Total 255.

== Commanders ==
- Colonel Jeremiah C. Sullivan April 2, 1861
- Colonel Robert Sanford Foster April 30, 1862
- Colonel Cyrus Johnson Dobbs June 13, 1863

== See also ==
- List of Indiana Civil War regiments
- Indiana in the Civil War
- Military Park (Indianapolis)

== Notes/References/Sources ==
Notes

Sources

- Dyer, Frederick Henry (1908). A Compendium of the War of the Rebellion (PDF). Des Moines, IA: Dyer Pub. Co. p. 1123. ASIN B01BUFJ76Q. This article incorporates text from this source, which is in the public domain.
- Federal Publishing Company (1908). Military Affairs and Regimental Histories of New Jersey, Indiana, Illinois and Michigan (PDF). The Union Army: A History of Military Affairs in the Loyal States, 1861–65 – Records of the Regiments in the Union army – Cyclopedia of battles – Memoirs of Commanders and Soldiers. Vol. III. Madison, WI: Federal Publishing Company. pp. 116–117. OCLC 694018100. This article incorporates text from this source, which is in the public domain.
- Terrell, William Henry Harrison (1865). Report of the Adjutant General of the State of Indiana (pdf). Indiana Adjutant General Reports. Vol. II. Indianapolis, IN: A.H. Connor State Printer. pp. 99–112. OCLC 558004259. This article incorporates text from this source, which is in the public domain.
- "Indiana Battle Flag Inventory". Indiana War Memorial. May 4, 2021.
