= List of Confederate units from Alabama =

Unofficial Alabama state flag flown at the advent of secession. January 1861.

This is a list of Alabama Civil War Confederate Units which fought for the Confederacy in the American Civil War, including Alabama state forces that were under local control. The list of Alabama Union units is given separately.

== Confederate army ==
=== Infantry ===
- Alabama Brigade
- 1st Infantry
  - Perote Guards (Company D)
- 1st Alabama, Tennessee, and Mississippi Infantry Regiment (see 54th Infantry)
- 2nd Infantry (see 1st Confederate Infantry Battalion)
- 3rd Infantry
- 4th Infantry
- 5th Infantry
- 6th Infantry
- 7th Infantry
- 8th Infantry
- 9th Infantry
- 10th Infantry
- 11th Infantry
- 12th Infantry
- 13th Infantry
- 14th Infantry
- 15th Infantry
- 16th Infantry
- 17th Infantry
- 18th Infantry
- 19th Infantry
- 20th Infantry
- 21st Infantry
- 22nd Infantry
- 23rd Infantry
- 24th Infantry
- 25th Infantry
- 26th Infantry (O'Neal's)
- 26th Infantry (Coltart's, see 50th Infantry)
- 27th Infantry
- 28th Infantry
- 29th Infantry
- 30th Infantry
- 31st Infantry (Hundley's)
- 31st Infantry (Hale's, see 49th Infantry)
- 32nd Infantry
- 33rd Infantry
- 34th Infantry
- 35th Infantry
- 36th Infantry
- 37th Infantry
- 38th Infantry
- 39th Infantry
- 40th Infantry
- 41st Infantry
- 42nd Infantry
- 43rd Infantry
- 44th Infantry
- 45th Infantry
- 46th Infantry
- 47th Infantry
- 48th Infantry
- 49th Infantry (formerly Hale's 31st)
- 50th Infantry (formerly 26th)
- 52nd Infantry (see 49th Infantry)
- 54th Infantry (formerly 4th Confederate)
- 55th Infantry
- 57th Infantry
- 58th Infantry
- 59th Infantry
- 60th Infantry
- 61st Infantry
- 1st Infantry Battalion (see 25th Infantry)
- 2nd Infantry Battalion (see 50th Infantry)
- 3rd Infantry Battalion (Coltart's, see 7th Infantry)
- 3rd Infantry Battalion (Smith's)
- 4th Infantry Battalion (see 29th Infantry)
- 5th Infantry Battalion (Golladay's, see 50th Infantry)
- 5th Infantry Battalion
- 6th Infantry Battalion (see 55th Infantry)
- 6th Infantry Battalion (McClellan's, see 25th Infantry)
- 7th Infantry Battalion (see 4th Confederate Infantry)
- 8th Infantry Battalion
- 9th Infantry Battalion (see 58th Infantry)
- 10th Infantry Battalion
- 16th Infantry Battalion (see 55th Infantry)
- 21st Infantry Battalion

=== Sharpshooters ===
- 17th Sharpshooter Battalion
- 23rd Sharpshooter Battalion

=== Cavalry ===
- 1st Cavalry
- 2nd Cavalry
- 3rd Cavalry
  - Prattville Dragoons (formerly Co. I, 7th Infantry)
- 4th Cavalry (Roddey's)
- 4th Cavalry (Russell's)
- 5th Cavalry
- 6th Cavalry
- 7th Cavalry
- 8th Cavalry (Hatch's)
- 8th Cavalry (Livingston's)
- 9th Cavalry
- 10th Cavalry
- 11th Cavalry (also 10th Regiment - Burtwell's)
- 12th Cavalry
- 53rd Cavalry
- 56th Cavalry
- Forrest's Cavalry (transferred to 13th Tennessee)
- Moreland's Cavalry
- 2nd Cavalry Battalion (see 9th Cavalry)
- 4th Cavalry Battalion
- 11th Cavalry Battalion
- 14th Cavalry Battalion (see 9th Cavalry)
- 18th Cavalry Battalion (Spann's Independent Scouts)
- 19th Cavalry Battalion (see 9th Cavalry)
- 22nd Cavalry Battalion
- 24th Cavalry Battalion
- 25th Cavalry Battalion (Milus E. "Bushwhacker" Johnston's Partisan Rangers)
- Beall's Cavalry Battalion
- Brewer's Cavalry Battalion (see 8th Confederate)
- Julian's Cavalry Battalion
- Lewis' (Harrell's) Cavalry Battalion
- Murphy's Cavalry Battalion
- Musgrove's Cavalry Battalion
- Stewart's Cavalry Battalion

=== Partisan rangers ===
- 1st Battalion, Partisan Rangers (see 18th Battalion Partisan Rangers)
- 12th Battalion, Partisan Rangers (see 12th Cavalry)
- 13th Battalion, Partisan Rangers (see 56th Cavalry)
- 14th Battalion, Partisan Rangers (see 9th Cavalry)
- 15th Battalion, Partisan Rangers (see 56th Partisan Rangers)
- 18th Battalion Partisan Rangers
- 51st Partisan Rangers
- 53rd Partisan Rangers (see 53rd Cavalry)
- 56th Partisan Rangers (see 56th Cavalry)

=== Artillery ===
- 1st Battalion Artillery
- 2nd Battalion Light Artillery
- 20th Battalion Artillery
- State Artillery Battery (Ketchum's - Garrity's)
- Barbour Light Artillery (Kolb's Battery)
- Eufaula Artillery Battery
- Fowler's Artillery Battery (Phelan's)
- Gid. Nelson Artillery Battery
- Hardaway's Artillery Battery (Hurt's)
- Jeff. Davis Artillery Battery
- Lee's Battery, Light Artillery
- McWhorter's Artillery Battery (Clanton's)
- Marks Artillery Battery (Semple's-Goldthwaite's)
- Seawell's Battery (Mohawk Artillery)
- Tarrant's Artillery Battery
- Truehart's Artillery Battalion
- Ward's Artillery Battery (Cruse's)

== Local organizations ==
=== Militia ===
- 1st Regiment Militia
- 2nd Regiment Militia
- 3rd Regiment Militia
- 4th Regiment Militia
- 48th Militia
- 89th Militia
- 94th Militia
- 95th Militia

=== Reserves ===
- 1st Reserves (Swanson Guards / Lockhart's Battalion) (62nd Infantry)
- 2nd Reserves (63rd Infantry)
- 3rd Reserves
- 4th Reserves (65th Infantry)
- 3rd Battalion Reserves
- Barbiere's Battalion Cavalry Reserves
- Hardie's Battalion, Cavalry Reserves
- Ready's Battalion, Reserves

=== Miscellaneous ===
- 1st Mobile Infantry (Local Defense)
- 1st Battalion, Cadets
- 1st Conscripts
- 1st Mobile Volunteers
- Bay Batteries
- Exchange Battalion
- Fire Battalion of Mobile
- Foster's Regiment
- Gracie's Special Infantry Battalion
- Hilliard's Legion
- Mobile City Troop
- Montgomery Guards

== See also ==
- Lists of American Civil War Regiments by State
- Alabama in the American Civil War
- List of Alabama Union Civil War regiments
