= Archibald Gracie IV =

American Titanic survivor (1858–1912)

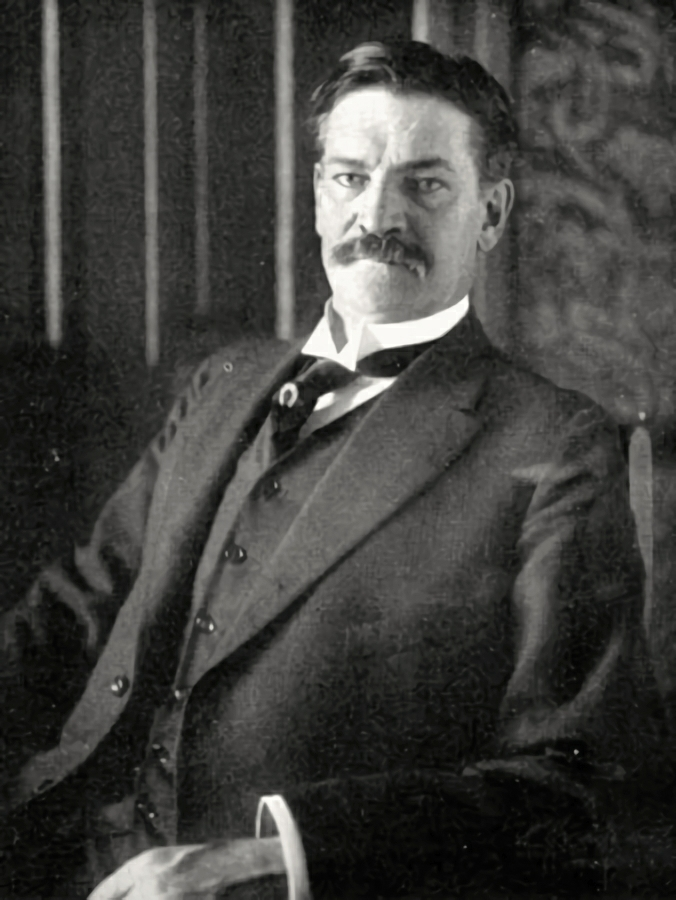
- Born: January 15, 1858; Mobile, Alabama, U.S.
- Died: December 4, 1912 (aged 54); New York City, U.S.
- Resting place: Woodlawn Cemetery (Bronx)
- Education: St. Paul's School; United States Military Academy
- Occupations: Writer, amateur historian, real estate investor
- Known for: Survivor of the Titanic
- Spouse: Constance Elise Schack (m. 1890)
- Children: 2
- Father: Archibald Gracie III

Archibald Gracie IV (January 15, 1858 – December 4, 1912) was an American writer, soldier, amateur historian, real estate investor, and passenger aboard RMS Titanic. Gracie survived the sinking of the Titanic by climbing aboard an overturned collapsible lifeboat and wrote a popular book about the disaster. He never recovered from his ordeal and died less than eight months after the sinking, becoming the first adult survivor to die.

== Early life ==
Archibald Gracie IV was born on January 15, 1858, in Mobile, Alabama, a member of the wealthy Scottish-American Gracie family of New York City. He was a namesake and direct descendant of Archibald Gracie, who had built Gracie Mansion, the current official residence of the mayor of New York City, in 1799. His father, Archibald Gracie III, had been an officer with the Confederate States Army during the American Civil War; in 1862, he was promoted to brigadier general. In 1863, the elder Gracie served at the Battle of Chickamauga; he was killed in action during the Siege of Petersburg in 1864. In that same year, Archibald IV attended St. Paul's School in Concord, New Hampshire. He later attended the United States Military Academy (though he did not graduate) and eventually became a colonel of the 7th New York Militia.

Gracie was an amateur historian and had a particular interest in the Battle of Chickamauga, in which his father had served. He spent a number of years researching the battle and eventually wrote a book titled The Truth about Chickamauga, which was published in 1911. In early 1912, Gracie traveled to Europe on the RMS Oceanic alone, without his wife or their daughter. He made his return trip to the United States aboard RMS Titanic as a first class passenger.

== Personal life ==
On April 22, 1890, Gracie married Constance Elise Schack, the daughter of Danish-born financier Otto Wilhelm Christian Schack and Elizabeth Inez McCarty. The ceremony was officiated by the Rev. Henry Y. Satterlee. Together, they had two daughters:

- Constance Julie Gracie (1891–1903), who was crushed to death on June 7, 1903, in an elevator shaft in the Hôtel de la Trémoïlle in Paris while the family was vacationing in Europe.
- Edith Temple Gracie (1894–1918), a debutante who was married on December 15, 1917, to Dunbar Burchell Adams, son of John Dunbar Adams, president of the American Chicle Company. She died of pneumonia a little over a year later, on December 31, 1918, aged 24.

Gracie's daughter Edith and wife Constance each inherited one-half of his estate. After his daughter's death, her husband inherited Edith's share. Constance lost her share of the estate in 1917 in the failure of a brokerage house and had to be financially supported by the father-in-law of her late daughter. In 1925, she "married Humberto Aguirre de Urbino, who had represented himself as a Count. He fled later, and, Mrs. Gracie said, had taken $5,000 worth of her jewels. It was brought out then that he was not a Count, but a dishwasher." Constance died at a sanitarium in Washington, D.C., in December 1937 at the age of 85.

== Titanic ==
Gracie boarded the Titanic at Southampton on April 10, 1912, and was assigned first-class cabin C51. He spent much of the voyage chaperoning various unaccompanied women. They included the writer Helen Churchill Candee, 52, and three sisters, née Lamson, who were also in their fifties: Charlotte Appleton, Malvina Cornell, and Caroline Brown. All four women survived the sinking, but Edith Corse Evans, 36, who accompanied the sisters (and Gracie) did not.

Gracie socialized with a group he called "our coterie", joined by Candee, his friend J. Clinch Smith, and several others. He also spent time reading books he had found in the first-class library and discussing the Civil War with the businessman Isidor Straus. Gracie was known among the other first-class passengers as a tireless raconteur who had an inexhaustible supply of stories about Chickamauga and the Civil War in general.

On April 14, Gracie decided that he had neglected his health and spent some time in physical exercise on the squash courts and in the ship's swimming pool. He then attended church services, had an early lunch, and spent the rest of the day reading and socializing. He went to bed early, intending on an early start the next morning on the ship's squash courts.

At about 11:40 pm ship's time Gracie was jarred awake by a jolt. He sat up, realized the ship's engines were no longer moving, and partially dressed, putting on a Norfolk jacket over his regular clothes, Gracie joined Smith at the foot of the forward First Class Grand Staircase on A Deck. Smith showed Gracie a piece of ice that had fallen off the berg. Reaching the Boat Deck, Gracie realized the ship was listing slightly. He returned to his cabin to put on his life jacket and on the way back found the women he had been chaperoning. He escorted them up to the Boat Deck and made sure they entered lifeboats. He then retrieved blankets for the women in the boats, and along with his friend Smith assisted Second Officer Charles Lightoller in filling the remaining lifeboats with women and children.

Once the last regular lifeboat had been launched at 1:55 am on the 15th, Gracie and Smith assisted Lightoller and others in freeing the four Engelhardt collapsible boats that were stored atop the crew quarters and attached to the roof by heavy cords and canvas lashings. Gracie had to lend Lightoller his penknife so the boats could be freed. The men were able to launch Collapsibles "C" and "D" and free Collapsible "A" from its lashings, but while they were freeing Collapsible B from its place the bridge was suddenly awash. Gracie later wrote about the moment:

My friend Clinch Smith made the proposition that we should leave and go toward the stern. But there arose before us from the decks below a mass of humanity several lines deep converging on the Boat Deck facing us and completely blocking our passage to the stern. There were women in the crowd as well as men and these seemed to be steerage passengers who had just come up from the decks below. Even among these people there was no hysterical cry, no evidence of panic. Oh the agony of it.

As the fore part of the ship dipped below the surface and the water rushed towards them, Gracie jumped with the wave, caught a handhold, and pulled himself up to the roof of the bridge. The undertow caused by the ship's sinking pulled Gracie down; he freed himself from the ship and rose to the surface near the overturned Collapsible Boat B. Gracie scrambled onto the overturned lifeboat along with a few dozen other men in the water. His friend Clinch Smith perished; his body was never recovered. In his memoir, Gracie surmises Smith became entangled with the ropes and other debris on the ship and could not free himself.

Gracie made it to the capsized Collapsible "B". Realising the risk to the boat of being swamped by the mass of swimmers around them, they paddled slowly away, ignoring the pleas of dozens of swimmers to be allowed on board. In his account, Gracie wrote of the admiration he had for those in the water; "In no instance, I am happy to say, did I hear any word of rebuke from a swimmer because of a refusal to grant assistance... [one refusal] was met with the manly voice of a powerful man... 'All right boys, good luck and God bless you'."

As the night wore on, the exhausted, freezing, and soaking wet men aboard the overturned Collapsible "B" found it almost impossible to remain on the slick keel. Gracie later wrote that over half the men who had originally reached the collapsible either died from exhaustion or cold and slipped off the upturned keel during the night. As dawn broke and it became possible for those in other lifeboats to see them, Second Officer Lightoller (who was also on the collapsible, along with Wireless Operator Harold Bride) used his officer's whistle to attract the other boats' attention; eventually lifeboats Nos. 4 and 12 rowed over and rescued the survivors of the overturned boat. Gracie was so tired that he was unable to make the jump himself. He was pulled into lifeboat No. 12, the last lifeboat to reach RMS Carpathia (the first rescue ship to arrive).

=== After the rescue ===
Gracie returned to New York City aboard Carpathia and immediately started on a book about his experiences aboard Titanic and Collapsible "B". His is one of the most detailed accounts of the events of the evening; Gracie spent months trying to determine exactly who was in each lifeboat and when certain events took place.

Gracie died before he could finish correcting the proofs of his book. It was published in 1913 under the original title, The Truth about the Titanic. Since then, the book has gone through numerous printings and is currently available under the title Titanic: A Survivor's Story. Most modern editions also include a short account of the disaster by Jack Thayer, who also survived the sinking aboard Collapsible "B"; Thayer's account, privately published for his family and friends in 1940, is titled The Sinking of the S.S. Titanic.

=== Health and death ===
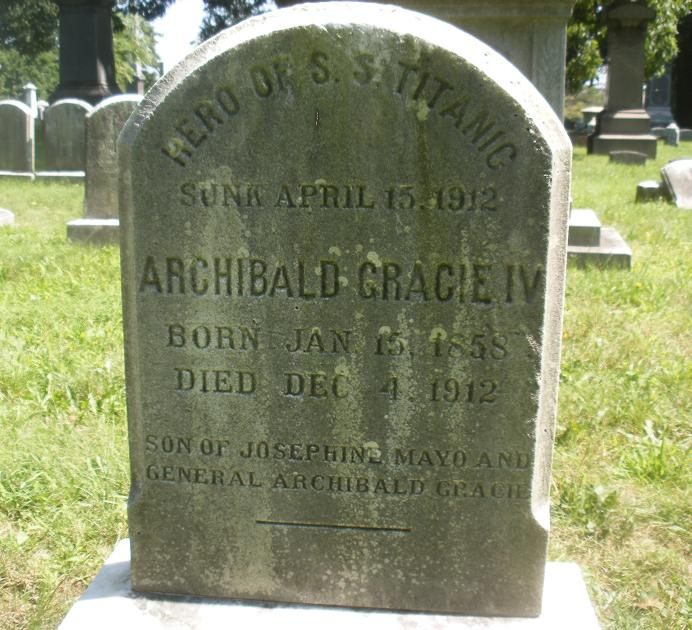
Gracie's grave marker, Woodlawn Cemetery, Bronx

Gracie never recovered from the ordeal he endured in the sinking of Titanic; as a diabetic, his health was severely affected by the hypothermia and physical injuries he suffered. It was reported, though, that he was well enough to attend a Thanksgiving reception at the Hotel Gotham. Gracie fell into a coma on December 2, 1912, and died of complications from diabetes on December 4, less than eight months after the sinking. Gracie was so preoccupied with the Titanic's sinking and work he had done on the subject that his last words were reportedly, "We must get them into the boats. We must get them all into the boats." He was buried in the Gracie family plot at Woodlawn Cemetery in the Bronx, New York City; many of his fellow survivors, as well as family members of victims, attended his funeral. He was the third survivor, and the first adult survivor, to die after the sinking.

== Portrayals ==
- Larry Gates (1956) – Kraft Television Theatre; A Night to Remember
- James Dyrenforth (1958) – A Night to Remember
- Bernard Fox (1997) – Titanic
- John Guerrasio (2012) – Titanic: Case Closed

== Bibliography ==
- Gracie, Colonel Archibald (1913). The Truth About the Titanic. New York: Mitchell Kennerley.
- Gracie, Archibald; Thayer, Jack (1988). Titanic: A Survivor's Story and the Sinking of the S.S. Titanic. Academy Chicago Publishers. ISBN 0-89733-452-3.
- Gracie, Archibald (1911). The Truth about Chickamauga. Morningside Bookshop. ISBN 0-89029-038-5.
