= 15th South Carolina Infantry Regiment =

- Flag of South Carolina
- Active: 1861 to April 26, 1865
- Country: Confederate States of America
- Allegiance: South Carolina
- Branch: Confederate States Army
- Type: Infantry
- Engagements: Port Royal; Sharpsburg; South Mountain; Fredericksburg; Chancellorsville; Gettysburg; Bean's Station; Chickamauga; Knoxville; The Wilderness; Spotsylvania Courthouse; North Anna; Cold Harbour; Siege of Petersburg; Hupp's Hill; Cedar Creek; Averasboro; Bentonville

The 15th South Carolina Infantry was an infantry regiment that served in the Confederate States Army during the American Civil War.

== History ==
=== Initial battle ===
The 15th South Carolina first entered combat on Hilton Head Island during the Battle of Port Royal Sound on November 7, 1861.

=== Transfer to Virginia ===
After service on the coast of South Carolina, the unit was transferred to Robert E. Lee’s Army of Northern Virginia (ANV) in July 1862. As part of Lee's Army, the 15th SC served in James Longstreet's corps in all of the ANV battles from Second Manassas onward, including Sharpsburg and South Mountain.

=== Battles in Kershaw's brigade ===
In November 1862, the 15th South Carolina joined Brigadier General Joseph B. Kershaw’s South Carolina brigade for the rest of the war. The regiment fought in the battles of Fredericksburg, Chancellorsville and Gettysburg.

Following the battle of Gettysburg in July 1863, Kershaw's brigade was sent by General Lee, along with two divisions of Longstreet’s corps, to the Western Army where they fought in the battles of Chickamauga, Knoxville and Bean's Station.

=== Return to the ANV ===
In April 1864, the 15th SC and the rest of Kershaw's brigade returned to Lee's Army of Northern Virginia command and fought in the battles of the Wilderness, Spotsylvania, North Anna, Cold Harbour and the siege of Petersburg. In August 1864, Lee ordered Kershaw's brigade to the Shenandoah Valley where the men fought in the battles at Charlestown, Strasburg's Hupp's Hill and Cedar Creek. In January 1865, General Lee ordered Kershaw's brigade to return to South Carolina to oppose Major General William Tecumseh Sherman’s army during his march through the Carolinas.

=== Charleston and surrender ===
Following the evacuation of Charleston, where the 15th South Carolina was one of the last Confederate fighting units to leave the city, and the battles of Averasboro and Bentonville in North Carolina, the regiment surrendered along with the rest of Kershaw's brigade to General Sherman as part of General Joseph E. Johnston’s Army of Tennessee in Greensboro, North Carolina on April 26, 1865. Kershaw's brigade and the 15th South Carolina Infantry served as the last Confederate provost guard protecting food and ordnance stores in Greensboro before finally returning to their homes in South Carolina.

== See also ==
- List of South Carolina Confederate Civil War units
