= 26th Alabama Infantry Regiment =

Infantry regiment of the Confederate States Army

- Flag of Alabama in 1861 (obverse and reverse)
- Active: March 27, 1862, to April 9, 1865
- Country: Confederate States of America
- Allegiance: Alabama
- Branch: Confederate States Army
- Type: Infantry
- Engagements: Battle of Seven Pines; Battle of Mechanicsville; Battle of Gaines Mill; Battle of South Mountain; Battle of Antietam; Battle of Fredericksburg; Battle of Chancellorsville; Battle of Gettysburg; Bristoe Campaign; Atlanta campaign Battle of Franklin; Battle of Nashville; Carolinas campaign

Commanders
- Colonel: William R. Smith
- Colonel: David F. Bryan
- Colonel: Edward A. O'Neal

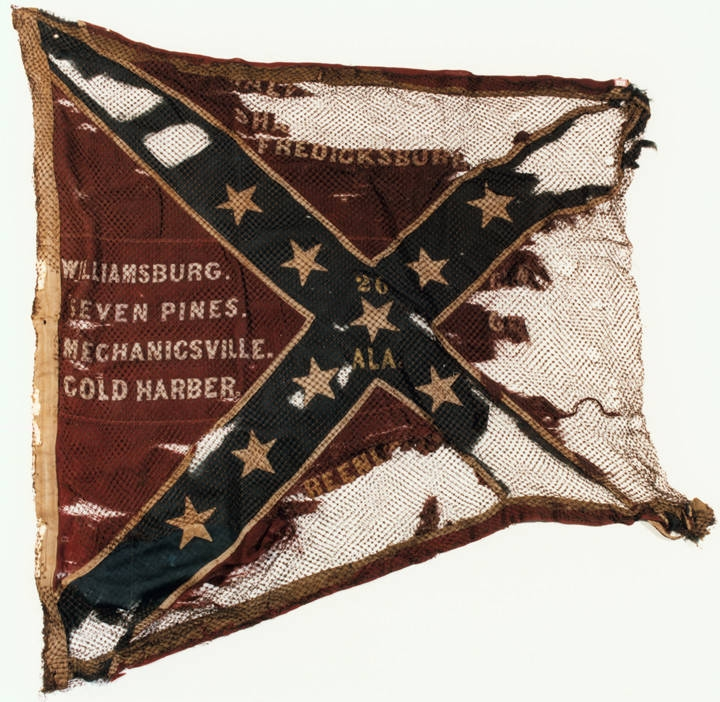
26th Alabama Infantry flag

The 26th Alabama Infantry Regiment was an infantry regiment of the Confederate States Army regiment during the American Civil War. The regiment was composed of ten companies that came from various counties across Alabama. It is one of the few regiments that served both in the Army of Northern Virginia and Army of Tennessee.

It is not to be confused with another 26th Alabama (Coltart's) which was formed around the same time in Mississippi; that unit being renumbered as the 50th Alabama Infantry Regiment on June 6, 1863.

== Organization and muster ==
The 26th Alabama Infantry Regiment was formed at Tuscumbia, Alabama, on March 27, 1862, by increasing the 3rd Alabama Battalion to a regiment. Two companies of the 3rd battalion had been captured at Fort Donelson, and were not part of the redesignation.

The regiment was consolidated with the 1st, 16th, 33rd and 45th Alabama Infantry Regiments on April 8, 1865, and redesignated 1st Alabama Infantry Regiment Consolidated and surrendered at Greensboro, North Carolina, on April 26, 1865.

== History ==
After forming at Tuscumbia, the regiment was ordered to Virginia on March 24 and reported to General John B. Magruder at Yorktown. It was assigned to the brigade of Brigadier General Gabriel J. Rains. They were engaged at the Battle of Seven Pines where their regimental commander, Col. Edward A. O'Neal was wounded. The brigade saw further action at Mechanicsville and Gaines Mill as part of General D.H. Hill's Division.

Missing the action at the Second Battle of Bull Run since D.H.Hill's Division was sent to Richmond to guard the capital, the regiment was engaged at the battles of South Mountain, Sharpsburg, Fredericksburg and Chancellorsville as part of Rodes Brigade. After the reorganization of the Army of Northern Virginia in the spring of 1863, Col. O'Neal took charge of the brigade, as General Rodes went on to command the Division as part of the Second Corps. The regiment took part in the Battle of Gettysburg. Cullen A. Battle later replaced O'Neill as brigade commander and the regiment went on to participate in the Bristoe and Mine Run Campaigns, before being on special duty.

On February 15, 1864, the regiment was ordered by Inspector General John H. Winder to convey prisoners to Andersonville, Georgia. The regiment served as guards at Andersonville until May. The regiment was intended to go back to Virginia but instead left for Montgomery, Alabama, on May 22 by order of Adjutant General Samuel Cooper, dated May 14. In June the regiment was part of the brigade of General James Cantey; sent north to be assigned to the Army of Tennessee. Canteys Brigade served in Walthall's Division, Polks Corps and was engaged in the Atlanta Campaign, the battles of Franklin and Nashville; serving until the final surrender at Durham Station near Greensboro, North Carolina, on April 26, 1865.

== See also ==
- List of Confederate units from Alabama
