= Micah Jenkins =

Confederate States Army officer (1835-1864)

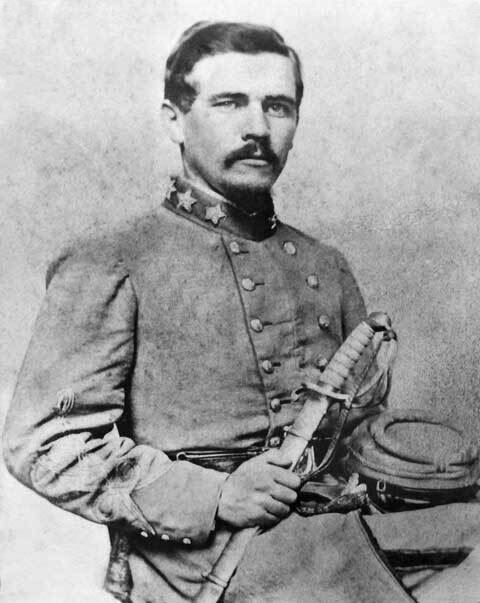
- Jenkins in uniform, c. 1862
- Born: December 1, 1835; Edisto Island, South Carolina, U.S.
- Died: May 6, 1864 (aged 28); Spotsylvania County, Virginia, C.S.
- Cause of death: Killed in action
- Burial place: Magnolia Cemetery, Charleston, South Carolina, U.S.
- Military career
- Allegiance: Confederate States
- Branch: Confederate States Army
- Service years: 1861-1864
- Rank: Brigadier-General
- Battles: American Civil War: First Battle of Bull Run; Battle of Seven Pines; Second Battle of Bull Run; Battle of Chickamauga; Knoxville Campaign; Battle of the Wilderness †

Micah Jenkins (December 1, 1835 – May 6, 1864) was a Confederate general in the American Civil War, mortally wounded by friendly fire at the Battle of the Wilderness.

== Early life and education ==
Jenkins was born on Edisto Island, South Carolina. He graduated first in his class from the South Carolina Military Academy, now called The Citadel, in 1854. Jenkins then organized the King's Mountain Military School from 1855 to 1861.

== American Civil War ==
Jenkins recruited a company of the 5th South Carolina Infantry Regiment and was elected as colonel on April 13, 1861. He fought under David R. Jones at the First Battle of Bull Run and later was brigaded under General Richard H. Anderson. During the April 1862 reorganization of the army, Jenkins retained his command of the 5th South Carolina. At the Battle of Seven Pines, Anderson was temporarily put in division command while Jenkins got brigade command of his own regiment, the 6th South Carolina, and the Palmetto Sharpshooters. He led with distinction in that battle, leading his brigade around the Union's flanks to their rear and forcing them to retreat 1.5 miles to the rear. During the battle, he was wounded in the knee.

Also during that year Jenkins was colonel of the Palmetto Sharpshooters. Considered one of the war's "boy generals", he was promoted to the rank of brigadier general on July 22, 1862, at the age of 26. He was later wounded at the Second Battle of Bull Run in August 1862, this time in the shoulder and chest. Consequently, Jenkins was absent from the Army of Northern Virginia when it fought the Battle of Antietam.

Jenkins' brigade served in the division of Maj. Gen. George Pickett at the Battle of Fredericksburg, although it was not engaged. Pickett's division participated in the campaign of Lt. Gen. James Longstreet against Suffolk, Virginia, in 1863, but Jenkins' brigade was retained near Richmond, Virginia, missing the Battle of Gettysburg.

Jenkins and his brigade went with Hood's Division of the First Corps to Tennessee in the fall of 1863, and participated in the second day's fighting of the Battle of Chickamauga on September 20. When division commander Maj. Gen. John Bell Hood was elevated to lead a corps; a bitter rivalry broke out over his succession. Brig. Gen. Evander Law had been in the division since it was created and had already commanded it on several occasions, including at Gettysburg and Chickamauga. However Jenkins was the senior officer, being promoted three months earlier, and with support of Longstreet took command. The internal quarrel greatly hindered the unit's efficiency in late 1863. When the corps returned to the Army of Northern Virginia in early 1864 the issue was resolved when Brig. Gen. Charles W. Field, who was senior to both, was assigned to the division, given command and promoted to Major General.

On January 16, 1864, Jenkins led his brigade to victory in the small Battle of Kimbrough's Crossroads against Federal cavalry. During the Battle of the Wilderness, Jenkins was riding with Lt. Gen. Longstreet when both were struck down by friendly fire on May 6, 1864. Although Longstreet survived, Jenkins died of his head wound a few hours later, and was buried in Magnolia Cemetery, Charleston, South Carolina.

== Personal life ==
Jenkins's son, Micah John Jenkins was born July 3, 1857, and graduated from West Point in 1879. He served in the Spanish–American War, as Captain of Troop K, 1st United States Volunteer Cavalry Regiment, the "Rough Riders." He fought with the Regiment in Cuba and was present during the attack on San Juan Hill. He was promoted to Major of the Regiment on August 11, 1898; and was mustered out of service with the Regiment at Montauk Point, Long Island, New York in September 1898.

General Micah Jenkins was mortally wounded during the Battle of the Wilderness by friendly fire and died in Spotsylvania County, Virginia on May,6th 1864. He is buried in Charleston, South Carolina.

== See also ==
- List of American Civil War generals (Confederate)
