= Battle of Dandridge =

Battle of the American Civil War

Coordinates: 36.0472°N 83.3493°W

- Part of the American Civil War
Date	January 17, 1864
Location	Jefferson County, Tennessee
Result	Confederate victory

Belligerents
United States (Union)	(Confederate States of America) CSA (Confederacy)

Commanders and leaders
Samuel D. Sturgis	James Longstreet

Units involved
Army of the Ohio; IV Corps	Department of East Tennessee

Strength
Unknown	Unknown

Casualties and losses
~100	~150

The Battle of Dandridge, January 17, 1864, was a minor battle of the American Civil War that occurred in Jefferson County, Tennessee.

== Background ==
Wanting to push the Confederates out of their winter headquarters and having received reports of good forage south of the French Broad River, Union forces under Maj. Gen. John G. Parke advanced on Dandridge, near the East Tennessee & Virginia Railroad, on January 14, with orders to cross the river and occupy the area for the Federals. This movement forced Confederate Lt. Gen. James Longstreet, who had been operating around Dandridge, to fall back beyond Kimbrough's Crossroads. Longstreet brought up reinforcements from Morristown on January 15 to meet the Federals and threaten the Union base at New Market.

On January 16, Brig. Gen. Samuel D. Sturgis, commanding the Cavalry Corps, Army of the Ohio, rode forward from Dandridge along the Morristown Road (now Valley Home Rd., State Hwy 66) to occupy Kimbrough's Crossroads. As the Union cavalry neared the crossroads, they discovered and engaged one of Longstreet's infantry brigades with artillery that had arrived the day before. The brigade was composed of Alabama troops, as well as others, and was under the command of Brigadier General Micah Jenkins, a South Carolinian. At the same time Union cavalry under the command of Col. Frank Wolford engaged Confederate forces south and east of Dandridge on the bend of Chucky Road. The Union cavalry could not dislodge the Confederate troops and were compelled to retire to Dandridge.

== Battle ==
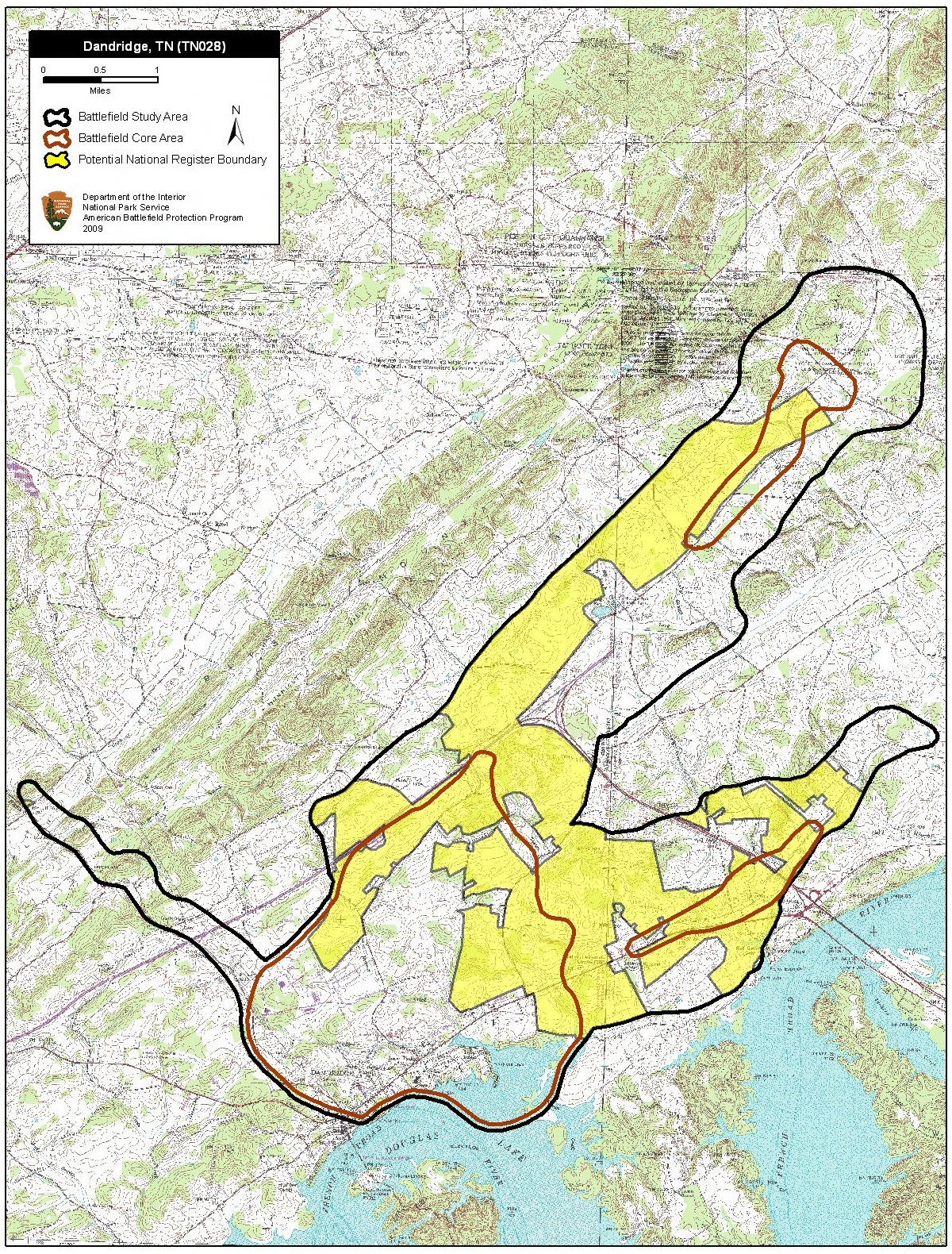
Map of Dandridge Battlefield core and study areas by the American Battlefield Protection Program.

Around noon on January 17, Sturgis received information that the Confederates were preparing for an attack, so he formed his men into lines of battle. About 4:00 p.m., the Confederates advanced towards Dandridge and the battle quickly turned to general fighting. The battle continued until after dark with the Union forces occupying roughly the same battle line as when the fighting started. Having failed to cross the river to the opposite bank, and fearing that Longstreet's entire force was in front of them, General Parke ordered the Federals to retreat to New Market and Strawberry Plains during the night. The Confederates pursued, but due to the lack of cannons, ammunition, and shoes, broke off and fell back to Dandridge. For the time being, the Union forces left the area.
