= Archibald Gracie III =

Confederate Army general (1832–1864)

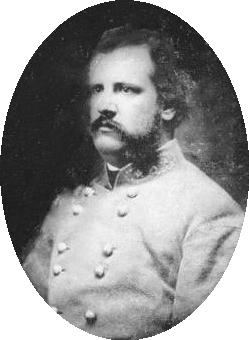

Personal details
- Born: December 1, 1832 New York City, New York
- Died: December 2, 1864 (aged 32) Petersburg, Virginia
- Resting place: Woodlawn Cemetery, The Bronx, New York City
- Spouse: Josephine Mayo (m. 1856)
- Children: 2, including Archibald Gracie IV
- Relatives: Archibald Gracie (grandfather)
- Education: University of Heidelberg; West Point
- Occupation: Soldier; Businessman

Military service
- Allegiance: United States of America; Confederate States of America
- Branch/service: United States Army; Confederate States Army
- Years of service: 1854–1856 (USA); 1861–1864 (CSA)
- Rank: Second Lieutenant (USA); Brigadier General (CSA)
- Battles/wars: American Civil War: Battle of Yorktown (1862); Battle of Perryville; Tullahoma Campaign; Battle of Chickamauga; Battle of Bean's Station; Siege of Petersburg †

Archibald Gracie III (December 1, 1832 – December 2, 1864) was a career United States Army officer, businessman, and a graduate of West Point. He is well known for being a Confederate brigadier general during the American Civil War and for his death during the Siege of Petersburg.

== Early life ==
Archibald Gracie III was born on December 1, 1832, to Archibald Gracie II (1795–1865), who married Elizabeth Davidson Bethune (d. 1864). He was born into a wealthy New York City family with interests in exporting cotton from Mobile, Alabama. After his elementary education, Gracie traveled to Germany for five years of further studying at the University of Heidelberg. After arriving back in the United States Archibald started his education at West Point, at the time of Robert E. Lee's superintendency. Gracie came to Lee's attention when, after intentionally stepping on fellow cadet Wharton J. Green's heels while marching, he was challenged to a fight on the parade grounds. When a teacher broke up the fight, which Gracie was losing badly, Green fled, and Gracie refused to tell who he'd been fighting. Days later, Green went into Lee's office to admit his role and demand an equal punishment. Lee decided to punish neither of them, and Gracie and Green became fast friends.

== Career ==
After graduating in 1854, he was appointed a second lieutenant and set off as an escort to Governor Isaac Stevens, who was on the way to the Walla Walla Council of 1855.

In 1857, Gracie resigned his post to join his father's firm, established during the 1840s in Mobile, Alabama, as agents of the London banking firm of Baring brothers. Later Gracie became president of the Barings Bank of Mobile. In Mobile, he joined the local militia company, one of several around the country called "Washington Light Infantry", and became its captain.

=== Civil War service ===
As Alabama seceded in 1861, by the orders of Governor Andrew B. Moore, Archibald and his men seized the Mount Vernon Arsenal. Gracie enlisted in the Confederate States Army. In June 1861, he was created a major of the 11th Alabama Regiment. From March to April 1862, he commanded a small company of sharpshooters, who were some of the first to reinforce General Magruder during the Battle of Yorktown. In July of that year, Gracie was put in command of a brigade near Chattanooga, Tennessee, consisting of the 43rd Alabama Infantry, 55th Georgia Infantry, 12th Georgia Infantry, 1st Georgia Artillery, and 1st Florida Dismounted Regiment. Through his successes in Huntsville, Tennessee, he was promoted to brigadier general on November 4, 1862, at the age of 29. His company was the guard of the rear of General Bragg's army in Harrodsburg during his retreat from the Battle of Perryville, and during his retreat after the Tullahoma Campaign. General Gracie's command took an active role during the Battle of Chickamauga, where he lost over 700 men.

Gracie and his unit then joined General James Longstreet's army at the Battle of Bean's Station. During this battle, Gracie was shot in the arm, causing temporary paralysis of his little and ring fingers. After his recovery, he was sent to Richmond to join General Beauregard. While there, he had a horse shot out from under him, but came away relatively unscathed. During the Siege of Petersburg, General Robert E. Lee was at "Gracie's Mortar Hell" inspecting Gracie's defenses. When Lee raised his head over the wall to glance at the Union position, Gracie climbed the wall in front of him. Lee then stated, "Why, Gracie, you will certainly be killed." Gracie replied, "It is better, General, that I be killed than you. When you get down, I will."

=== Siege of Petersburg ===
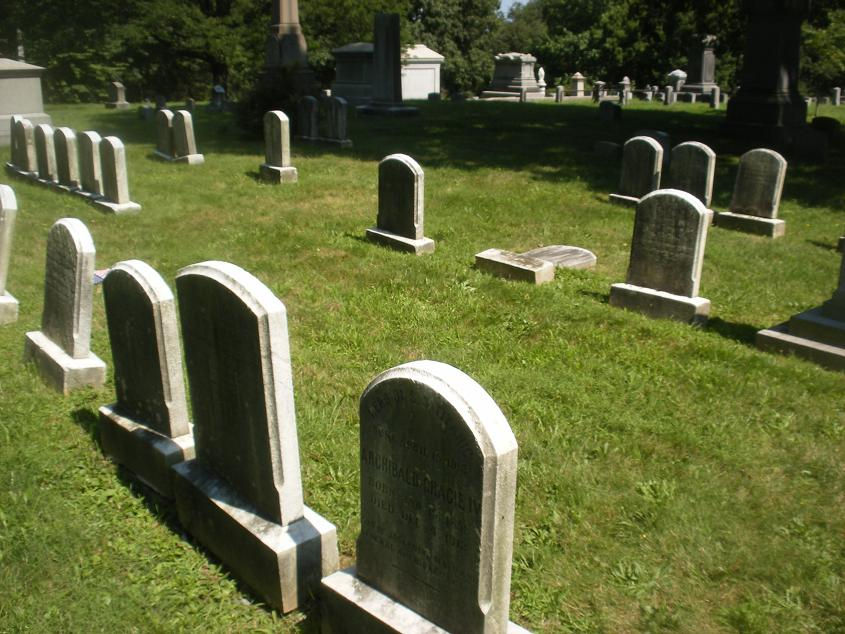
Gracie family plot, Woodlawn Cemetery, The Bronx. The fallen marker, (since restored) is the general's.

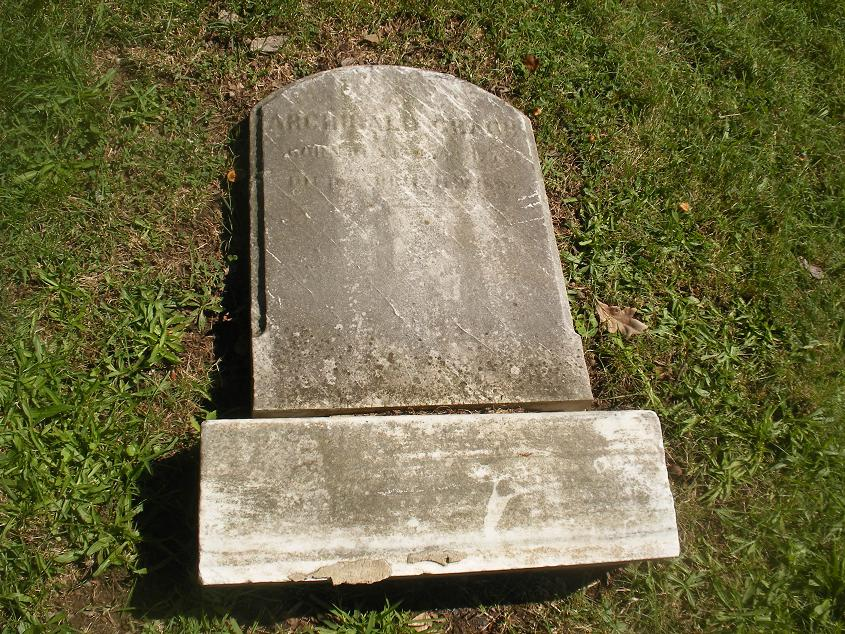
Gracie grave marker, fallen off base, has since been restored

Between July and December 1864, Gracie served in the trenches of Petersburg, Virginia, during the Siege of Petersburg. On December 1, Gracie's 32nd birthday, his second child, a girl, was born, and he was to take a leave to see the baby on December 3. On December 2, however, Archibald Gracie was looking out at the Union lines through his telescope when an artillery shell exploded in front of him, killing him instantly.

Because of his actions at the Battle of Chickamauga, Gracie's name was put into consideration for a promotion to a major general, but his death caused the consideration to be suspended. Francis "Frank" Orray Ticknor eulogized Gracie's death in the poem "Gracie, of Alabama," which he sent to General Robert H. Chilton.

== Personal life ==
On November 19, 1856, Gracie married Josephine Mayo (1836–1901), daughter of Edward Carrington Mayo (1791–1852) and Adeline Marx (1808–1879). Josephine was the niece of General Winfield Scott through her father's sister, Maria D. Mayo (1789–1862), and was the great great granddaughter of Major William Mayo, who laid out the city of Richmond in 1737. Together, the couple had a son and a daughter, who was born the day before Gracie's death. Their children were:

- Archibald Gracie IV (1858–1912), the famous survivor of the Titanic.
- Adeline Gracie (1864–1948)

Gracie is buried in Woodlawn Cemetery in The Bronx, New York City.

== Commemorations ==
The Sons of Confederate Veterans Camp in New York City, Archibald Gracie Camp #985, is named for Gracie.

== See also ==
- List of American Civil War generals (Confederate)
- Gracie Mansion
- Archibald Gracie IV
