= Albert Magilton =

American colonel

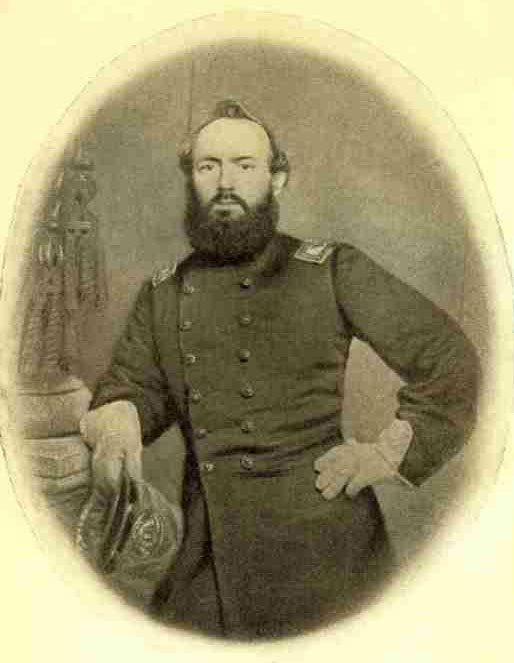
- Born: July 8, 1826; New Castle, Delaware, US
- Died: December 28, 1875 (aged 49); Philadelphia, Pennsylvania, US
- Burial place: West Laurel Hill Cemetery, Bala Cynwyd, Pennsylvania, US
- Education: United States Military Academy
- Spouse: Mary Lee Magilton (m. 1855–1875)
- Military career
- Allegiance: United States (Union)
- Branch: United States Army (Union Army)
- Service years: 1842 – 1857; 1861 – 1862
- Commands: 4th Pennsylvania Reserve Regiment; 31st Pennsylvania Infantry Regiment
- Conflicts: Mexican–American War: Mexico City Campaign; Battle of Contreras; Battle of Churubusco; American Civil War: Peninsula Campaign; Battle of Beaver Dam Creek; Battle of Gaines' Mill; Battle of Glendale (WIA); Maryland campaign; Battle of South Mountain; Battle of Antietam; Fredericksburg campaign; Battle of Fredericksburg

Albert Lewis Magilton (July 8, 1826 –December 28, 1875) was an American colonel who served the Union during the American Civil War who commanded the 4th Pennsylvania Reserve Regiment and who participated the Battle of Antietam under the command of George Meade.

== Biography ==
=== Early military career ===
Albert was born on July 8, 1826, at New Castle, Delaware, before shortly moving to Philadelphia as the son of his father who was a carpenter of Irish origin and his mother who was a native of Delaware.

After graduating from Central High School Magilton won an appointment at the United States Military Academy in 1842 after a personal request from Alexander Dallas Bache, (who had been a former President of Central High) himself before graduating in July 1846, ranking 16th at the Class of 1846. After graduation, he served in the Mexican–American War as a 2nd Lieutenant in the 4th US Artillery. Due to his participation at the battles of Contreras and Churubusco, he was promoted to Brevet First Lieutenant. He would gain another promotion to First Lieutenant for his service during the Third Seminole War. Magilton would then go on to be stationed at various places such as Leavenworth, Kansas from 1851 to 1852, then to the plains of New Mexico in 1853, then back to Leavenworth before being stationed at Fort Brady from 1853 to 1855. In 1856, he married Mary Lee whom he would have 2 children with.

He was then made captain in 1857 but Magilton left the army in December that year. He would briefly be in the fuel industry back at Philadelphia with his father before returning to military service on the outbreak at the American Civil War.

=== American Civil War ===
Magilton was initially a Lieutenant Colonel of the 2nd Pennsylvania Reserve Regiment in June 1861 before being assigned to the 4th Pennsylvania Reserve Regiment on October 4 of the same year after Robert G. March was forced to resign due to his illness.

Magilton would go on to participate at the Battle of Gaines' Mill, the Battle of Beaver Dam Creek, the Battle of New Market and the Battle of Glendale where he got wounded during the fighting.

Magilton later participated at the Battle of South Mountain before General George Meade became commander of the division and Magilton assumed command of the 2nd Brigade. He then lead the 2nd Brigade at the Battle of Antietam.

=== Later years ===
For the rest of the war, he would also serve at the Battle of Fredericksburg before resigning on December 23, 1862. He would briefly reenter military service in 1864, teaching infantry tactics at the Philadelphia Free Military School for officers of Colored Troops. He also became a Deputy Collector of the US Internal Revenue from 1864 until his death from liver disease on December 28, 1875.
