= 4th Pennsylvania Reserve Regiment =

Union Army infantry regiment

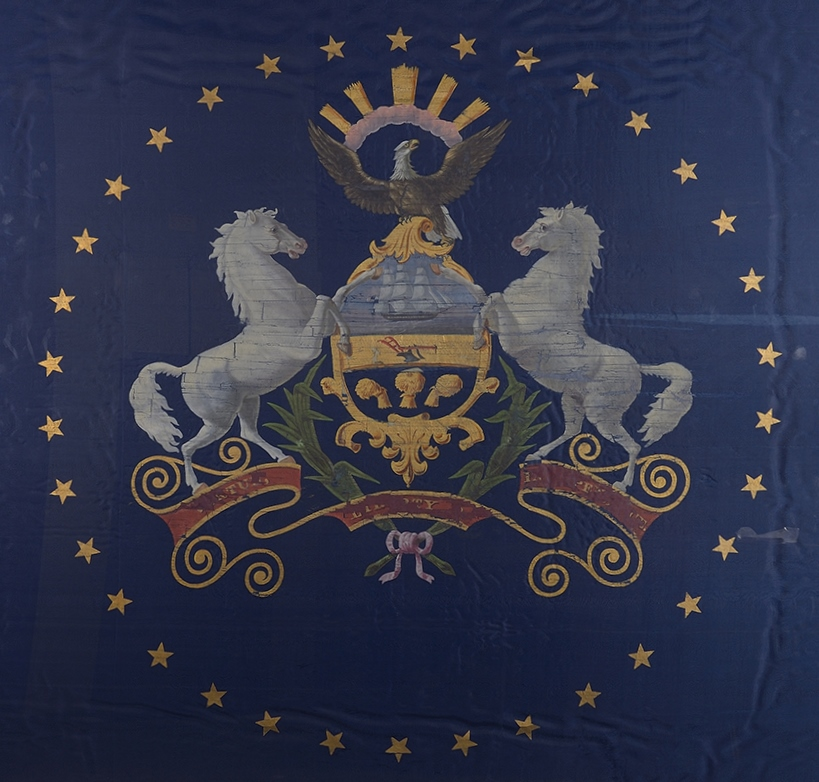
- Pennsylvania flag, c. 1863
- Active: July 17, 1861 – June 8, 1864
- Country: United States
- Allegiance: Union
- Branch: Infantry
- Engagements: Battle of Mechanicsville; Battle of Gaines' Mill; Battle of Glendale; Battle of Malvern Hill; Battle of Second Bull Run; Battle of South Mountain; Battle of Antietam; Battle of Fredericksburg; Battle of Cloyd's Mountain

The 4th Pennsylvania Reserve Regiment, also known as the 33rd Pennsylvania Volunteer Infantry Regiment, was an infantry regiment that served in the Union Army during the American Civil War. It was a part of the famed Pennsylvania Reserves in the Army of the Potomac for much of the early part of the war and served in the Eastern Theater in several important battles, including Antietam and Fredericksburg.

== Organization ==
Company	Moniker	Primary Location of Recruitment	Captains
A	The Able Guards	Philadelphia	John Schoenewald
B	The Quaker City Guards	Philadelphia	Robert M. McClure
C	The Montgomery Rifles	Montgomery County	Isaiah W. Kimble
D	The Dickson Guards	Philadelphia	Nathan J. Taylor
E	The Williamsport Legion	Lycoming County	Francis H. Burger
F	The National Guards of Monroe	Monroe County	George B. Keller
G	The Harmer Guards	Philadelphia	Thomas F.B. Tapper
H	The Susquehanna Union Volunteers	Susquehanna County	Elisha B. Gates
I	The Reed Guards	Philadelphia	Henry Einwechter
K	The Enton Guards	Chester County	William Babe

== Service ==
The 4th Pennsylvania Reserves were raised at Harrisburg, Pennsylvania, on July 17, 1861. Robert G. March served as its first colonel, John F. Gaul as lieutenant colonel, and Robert M. McClure as major. The regiment trained near Easton until mid-July, when it was transferred to Camp Curtin in Harrisburg and then to Baltimore. On October 1, March was forced to resign due to illness and was succeeded by Lt. Col. Albert Magilton of the 2nd Reserves. The 4th became part of the 2nd Brigade of the Pennsylvania Reserves division, part of the I Corps, Army of the Potomac.

At first remaining with the I Corps in northern Virginia, the 4th, along with the rest of the division, was sent to the Army outside of Richmond, where it was reassigned to the V Corps. During the Peninsula Campaign, it fought in the Seven Days Battles, losing about 200 men. The regiment lost 27 men at the Battle of South Mountain and another 49 men at Antietam. After Fredericksburg, the 2nd Brigade, including the 4th Pennsylvania Reserves, was transferred from the Army of the Potomac in early 1863 to serve in the defenses of Washington, D.C. In 1864, it served in West Virginia, fighting at the Battle of Cloyd's Mountain, where the regiment's colonel, Richard H. Woolworth, was mortally wounded.

The depleted regiment was mustered out in Philadelphia on June 15, 1864, when its original three-year term of enlistment expired. Men who reenlisted and those replacements whose enlistments had not yet expired were transferred to the 54th Pennsylvania Volunteer Infantry on June 8.

== Casualties ==
The 4th Pennsylvania Reserves suffered 2 officers and 76 enlisted men killed in battle or died from wounds, and 1 officer and 60 enlisted men died from disease, for a total of 139 fatalities.

== Commanders ==
- Col. Robert G. March, July 17 to October 1, 1861 (resigned due to illness)
- Lt. Col. (to Col. 10/1/61) Albert L. Magilton, October 1, 1861, to September 14, 1862 (became brigade commander)
- Maj. John Nyce, September 14 to November 29, 1862 (Promoted to Colonel of 174th Pennsylvania)
- Col. Albert L. Magilton, November 29, 1862, to December 28, 1862 (resigned)
- Lt. Col. (to Col. 3/1/63) Richard H. Woolworth, December 28, 1862, to May 9, 1864 (killed at Cloyd's Mountain)
- Lt. Col. (to Col. 5/10/64) Thomas F.B. Tapper, May 9, 1864, to June 17, 1864 (mustered out)

== See also ==
- Pennsylvania Reserves
- Pennsylvania in the Civil War
