= Powhite Creek (Hanover County) =

Stream in Hanover County, Virginia, U.S.

Coordinates: 37°33′35″N 77°17′58″W

Powhite Creek is a stream in Hanover County, Virginia. It is a small left-hand branch of the Chickahominy River. The latitude and longitude coordinates of Powhite Creek are 37.5595898 (North), -77.2991446 (West) and the approximate elevation is 59 feet above sea level.

== Historical significance ==
Powhite Creek is mentioned in the 1749 will of William Massie, a Justice of the Peace and a vestryman in New Kent County, who gave his wife the plantation and 300 acres of Powhite Creek in Hanover County.

Before the Battle of Gaines' Mill 1862, Robert E. Lee made the incorrect assumption that the Union V Corps under Fitz John Porter would defend the line of Powhite Creek, somewhat to the west of V Corps' actual location.
