= Silas M. Baily =

American Union Army general

Silas Milton Baily
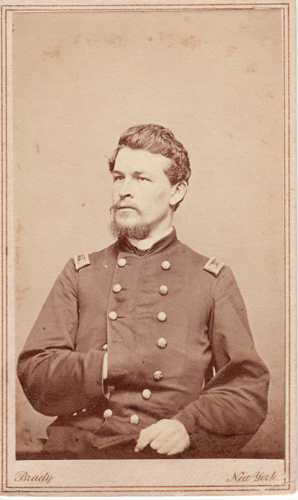

Treasurer of Pennsylvania
- In office 1882–1884
- President: Chester A. Arthur
- Preceded by: Samuel Butler
- Succeeded by: William Livsey

Personal details
- Born: January 4, 1836 Brownsville, Pennsylvania, U.S.
- Died: May 5, 1900 (aged 64) Uniontown, Pennsylvania, U.S.

Military service
- Allegiance: United States (Union)
- Branch: United States Army (Union Army)
- Years of service: 1861 – 1864
- Rank: Colonel; Bvt. Brigadier General
- Commands: 8th Pennsylvania Reserve Regiment
- Battles/wars: American Civil War; Peninsula campaign; Battle of Gaines' Mill (WIA); Maryland campaign; Battle of South Mountain; Battle of Antietam; Fredericksburg campaign; Battle of Fredericksburg (WIA); Overland Campaign; Battle of the Wilderness; Battle of Spotsylvania Court House

Silas Milton Baily was an American Brevet Brigadier General during the American Civil War. Throughout his career, he was one of the commanders of the 8th Pennsylvania Reserve Regiment, commanding Company I of the regiment. He was also the Treasurer of Pennsylvania from 1882 to 1884, serving only one term.

== Early years ==
Silas was born on January 4, 1836. Before the war, he had gained a liberal English educated as well as a career as a jeweler at Waynesburg, Pennsylvania.

== American Civil War ==
When the American Civil War broke out, Baily assisted with mustering soldiers and finally became captain of what would become the 8th Pennsylvania Reserve Regiment on June 20, 1861, at Company I. He was promoted to Major of the regiment due to Jesse B. Gardner resigning on June 4, 1862. During the Battle of Gaines' Mill, Baily was severely wounded in the face and had to be carried back to Washington, D.C. Despite his surgeon telling him that he was unfit for battle by the time the Maryland campaign broke out, Baily was willing to command the regiment again through sheer determination. Baily went on to participate at the Battle of South Mountain and the Battle of Antietam and was described as leading with "distinguished gallantry". However, Baily got wounded again at the Battle of Fredericksburg but was promoted to Colonel on March 1, 1863, for his previous service at South Mountain and Antietam. Despite this though, Baily continued to participate at the war, going on to participate at the Overland Campaign in the battles of the Wilderness and Spotsylvania Court House until the 8th Pennsylvania was mustered out on May 24, 1864. Baily was Brevetted Brigadier General on March 13, 1865, for his service in the Wilderness and at Spotsylvania Court House.

== Later years ==
After the war, Baily returned to his jeweler career as he opened a jewelry store at Uniontown, Pennsylvania. He attempted to run for the United States Congress in 1878 but was made the Treasurer of Pennsylvania from 1882 to 1884. Baily retired from his jeweler career in February 1900, selling his business off and remained in retirement until his death on May 5, 1900, and was later buried at Oak Grove Cemetery, South Union Township.

== See also ==
- List of American Civil War brevet generals (Union)
