= Fitz John Porter =

American Union Army general

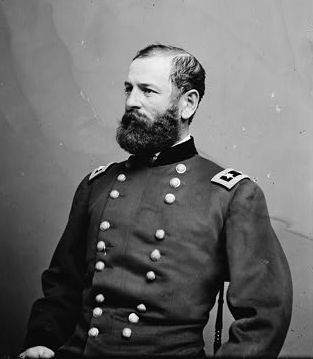
- Porter Between 1860 and 1870
- Born: August 31, 1822; Portsmouth, New Hampshire, U.S.
- Died: May 21, 1901 (aged 78); Morristown, New Jersey, U.S.
- Burial place: Green-Wood Cemetery, Brooklyn, New York
- Relatives: William D. Porter (cousin); David Dixon Porter (cousin); David G. Farragut (cousin)
- Military career
- Allegiance: United States of America; Union
- Branch: United States Army; Union Army
- Service years: 1845–1863; 1886
- Rank: Major general
- Commands: V Corps, Army of the Potomac
- Conflicts: Mexican–American War; Siege of Veracruz; Battle of Cerro Gordo; Battle of Contreras; Battle of Molino del Rey; Battle of Chapultepec (WIA); Utah War; American Civil War; Manassas campaign; Battle of Hoke's Run; Peninsula campaign; Battle of Yorktown; Battle of Hanover Court House; Seven Days Battles; Battle of Beaver Dam Creek; Battle of Gaines's Mill; Battle of Malvern Hill; Northern Virginia campaign; Second Battle of Bull Run; Maryland campaign; Battle of Antietam; Battle of Shepherdstown
- Other work: Public works commissioner, police commissioner, and fire commissioner (NYC)

Fitz John Porter (August 31, 1822 – May 21, 1901) (sometimes written FitzJohn Porter or Fitz-John Porter) was a career United States Army officer and a Union general during the American Civil War. He is most known for his performance at the Second Battle of Bull Run and his subsequent court martial.

Although Porter served well in the early battles of the Civil War, his military career was ruined by the controversial trial, which was called by his political rivals. After the war, he worked for almost 25 years to restore his tarnished reputation and was finally restored to the army's roll.

== Early life and education ==
Porter was born on August 31, 1822, in Portsmouth, New Hampshire, the son of Captain John Porter and Eliza Chauncy Clark. He came from a family prominent in American naval service; his cousins were William D. Porter, David Dixon Porter, and David G. Farragut. Porter's father was an alcoholic who had been reassigned to land duty. Porter's childhood was chaotic because of his father's illness.

The younger Porter pursued an army career. He graduated from Phillips Exeter Academy, then from the United States Military Academy (West Point) in 1845, standing eighth out of 41 cadets, and was brevetted a second lieutenant in the 4th U.S. Artillery.

== Career ==
Porter was promoted to second lieutenant on June 18, 1846, and First Lieutenant on May 29, 1847. He served in the Mexican–American War and was appointed a brevet captain on September 8, 1847, for bravery at the Battle of Molino del Rey. He was wounded at Chapultepec on September 13, for which he also received a brevet promotion to major. He was an original member of the Aztec Club of 1847, a military society founded that year composed of officers who served during the Mexican War, and presided over it from 1892 to 1893.

After the war with Mexico ended, Porter returned to West Point and became a cavalry and artillery instructor from 1849 to 1853. He served as adjutant to the academy's superintendent until 1855. He next was posted to Fort Leavenworth, Kansas, as assistant adjutant general in the Department of the West in 1856; he was brevetted to captain at Fort Leavenworth that June. Porter served under future Confederate Albert Sidney Johnston in the expedition against the Mormons in 1857 and 1858. Afterward, Porter inspected and reorganized the defenses of Charleston Harbor, South Carolina, until late 1860.

=== American Civil War ===
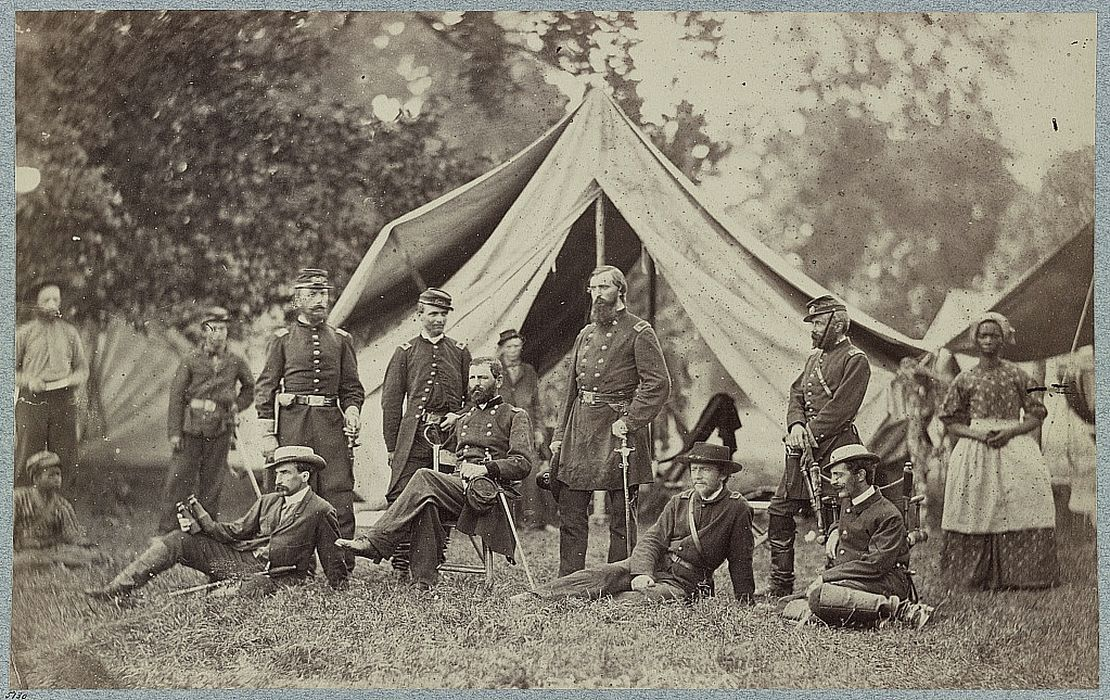
Porter (seated in chair) and staff

After the start of the Civil War, Porter became chief of staff and assistant adjutant general for the Department of Pennsylvania, but he was soon promoted to colonel of the 15th Infantry on May 14, 1861. General John A. Logan, Porter's later political nemesis, would accuse Porter of helping persuade his commander Robert Patterson to let Joseph E. Johnston's force escape out of the Shenandoah Valley and reinforce P. G. T. Beauregard, thus turning the tide at the First Battle of Bull Run. In August, Porter was promoted to brigadier general of volunteers, backdated to May 17 so he would be senior enough to receive divisional command in the Army of the Potomac, newly formed under Maj. Gen. George B. McClellan. Soon Porter became a trusted adviser and loyal friend to McClellan, but his association with the soon-to-be-controversial commanding general would prove to be disastrous for Porter's military career.

Porter led his division at the beginning of the Peninsula Campaign, seeing action at the Siege of Yorktown. McClellan created two provisional corps and Porter was assigned to command the V Corps. During the Seven Days Battles, and particularly at the Battle of Gaines' Mill, he displayed a talent for defensive fighting. At the Battle of Malvern Hill, Porter also played a leading role.

==== Inadvertent balloon ride ====
In addition, Porter had a memorable experience during the Siege of Yorktown when he decided to make aerial observations in a hydrogen balloon on April 11, 1862 without the assigned expert to handle the craft, Professor Thaddeus Lowe. When he ascended with only one securing line, the balloon subsequently broke loose and General Porter found himself drifting west over enemy lines at Yorktown in danger of being captured or killed. Fortunately, the combination of a favorable wind change and gas valve adjustment allowed Porter land safely three miles from his starting point. Although it was an embarrassing accident, General Porter was able to perform his observations of enemy defences as intended and recorded his findings, although the balloon program was disbanded a year later.

For his successful performance on the peninsula, he was promoted to major general of volunteers on July 4, 1862.

==== Second Bull Run ====
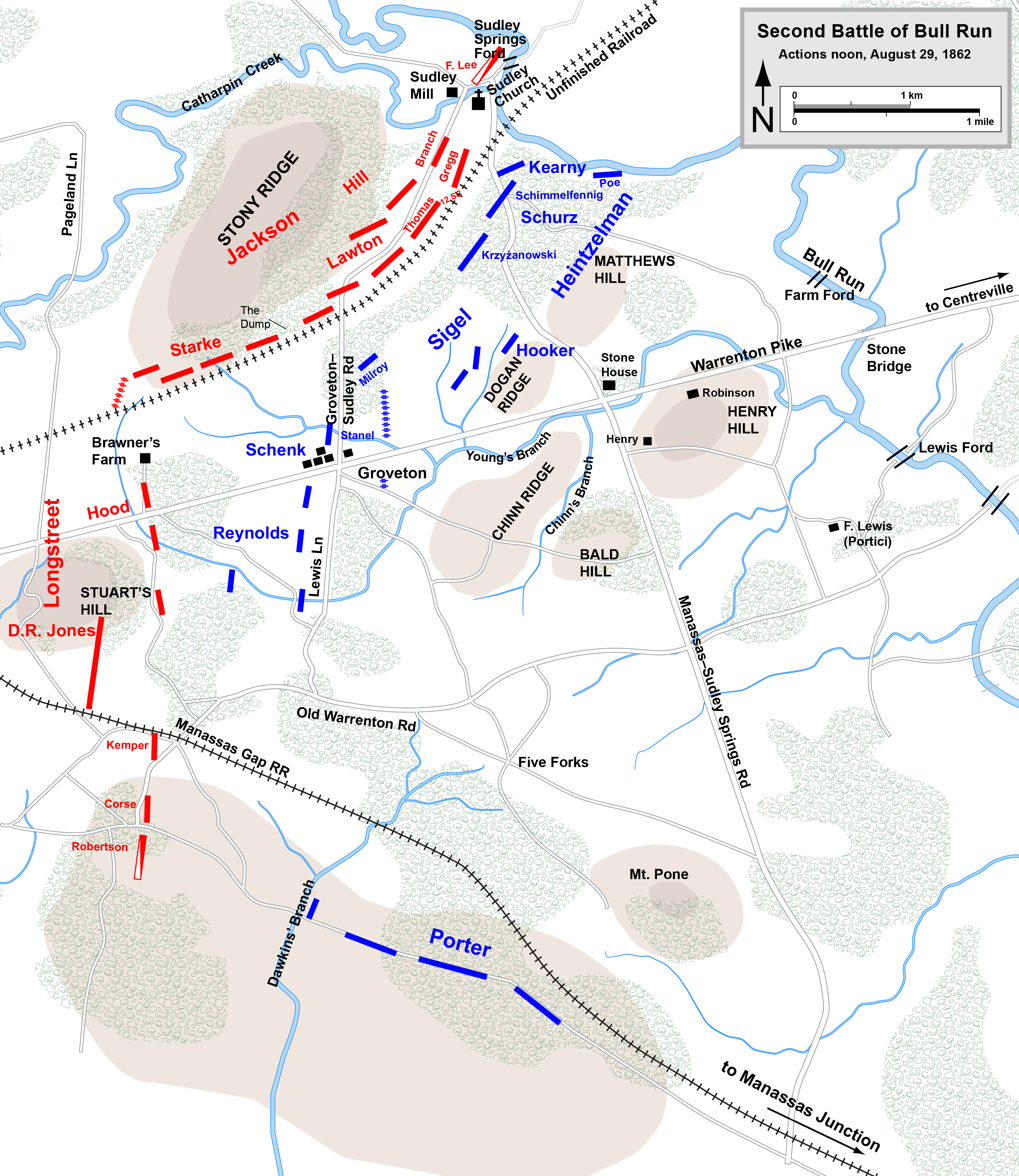
August 29, noon; Longstreet's Corps arrives; Porter's Corps stops and does not engage

Porter's corps was sent to reinforce Maj. Gen. John Pope in the Northern Virginia Campaign, a reassignment that he openly challenged and complained about, criticizing Pope personally. During the Second Battle of Bull Run, on August 29, 1862, he was ordered to attack the flank and rear of Maj. Gen. Thomas J. "Stonewall" Jackson's wing of the Army of Northern Virginia. Porter had stopped at Dawkin's Branch, where he had encountered Maj. Gen. J.E.B. Stuart's cavalry screen. On August 29 he received a message from Pope directing him to attack the Confederate right (which Pope assumed to be Jackson on Stony Ridge), but at the same time to maintain contact with the neighboring division under Maj. Gen. John F. Reynolds, a conflict in orders that could not be resolved. Pope was apparently unaware that Confederate Maj. Gen. James Longstreet's wing of the opposing army had arrived on the battlefield; the proposed envelopment of Jackson's position would have collided suicidally with Longstreet's large force. Porter chose not to make the attack because of the intelligence he had received that Longstreet was to his immediate front.

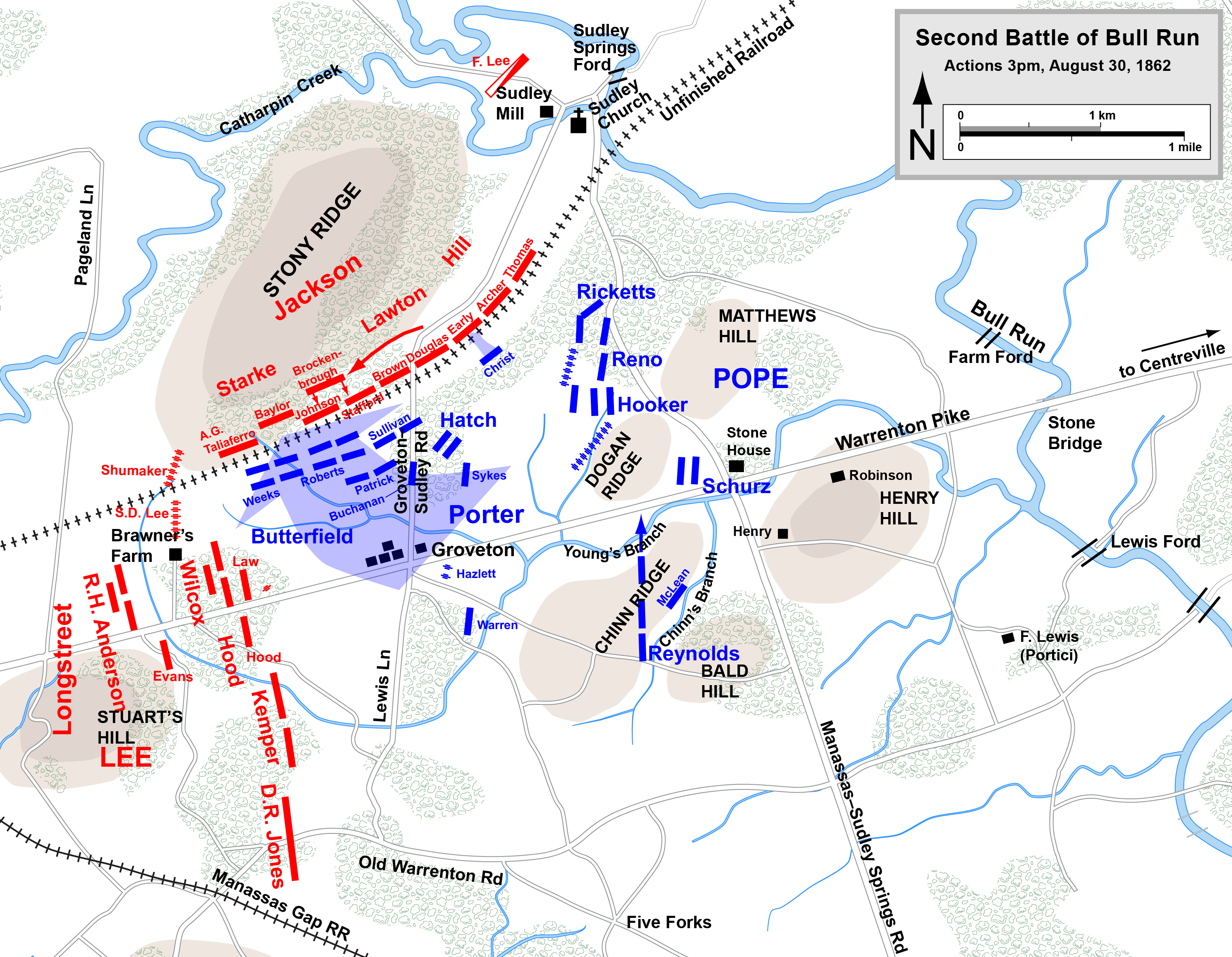
August 30, 3:00; Porter turns and attacks, Longstreet in position to attack and "rolls up" Pope's army

Frustrated, Pope moved Porter from his current position around to the main line after darkness fell and prepared for an all-out assault at dawn. As the V Corps turned to head towards Jackson's right and attacked, it presented its own (and consequently the entire army's) flank to Longstreet's waiting men. Porter's corps was on the exposed flank under the general direction of McDowell. On his own initiative, Porter had taken the precaution of stationing two New York regiments on his left as a shield against disaster, and these New Yorkers caught the brunt of Longstreet's assault, led by Hood. About 30,000 Confederates assailed Porter's 5,000 New Yorkers, doing exactly what Porter most feared. Nevertheless, the respite bought with the blood of the New York regiments gave Pope time to bring up reinforcements from the right, and they offered what resistance they could to the Confederate line surging eastward on both sides of the pike. The result was defeat, but not catastrophic collapse. Nonetheless, Pope was infuriated, accused Porter of insubordination, and relieved him of his command on September 5.... Shelby Foote "The Civil War," Vol. 1, pp. 635, 639.

Porter was soon restored to command of the corps by McClellan and led it through the Maryland Campaign, where the corps served in a reserve position during the Battle of Antietam. He is said to have told McClellan, "Remember, General, I command the last reserve of the last Army of the Republic." McClellan took his implied advice and failed to commit his reserves into a battle that might have been won if he had used his forces aggressively.

=== Court martial ===
On November 25, 1862, Porter was arrested and court-martialed for his actions at Second Bull Run. By this time, McClellan had been relieved by President Abraham Lincoln and could not provide political cover for his protégé. Porter's association with the disgraced McClellan and his open criticism of Pope were significant reasons for his conviction at court-martial. Porter was found guilty on January 10, 1863, of disobedience and misconduct, and he was dismissed from the Army on January 21, 1863.

In describing the Battle of Second Manassas, Edward Porter Alexander wrote that Confederates who knew Porter respected him greatly and considered his dismissal "one of the best fruits of their victory".

== Later life and death ==
After the war ended, Porter was offered a command in the Egyptian Army but declined it. He spent most of the remainder of his public life fighting against the perceived injustice of his court-martial.

In 1878, a special commission under General John Schofield exonerated Porter by finding that his reluctance to attack Longstreet probably saved Pope's Army of Virginia from an even greater defeat. Eight years later, President Grover Cleveland commuted Porter's sentence and a special act of the U.S. Congress restored Porter's commission as an infantry colonel in the U.S. Army, backdated to May 14, 1861, but without any back pay due. Two days later, August 7, 1886, Porter, seeing vindication, voluntarily retired from the Army.

Porter was involved in mining, construction, and commerce. He was appointed as the New York City Commissioner of Public Works, the New York City Police Commissioner, and the New York City Fire Commissioner.

On December 27, 1894, Porter, along with 18 others, founded the Military and Naval Order of the United States, which was soon renamed the Military Order of Foreign Wars. Porter's name was at the top of the list of signers of the original institution and received the first insignia issued by the Order.

Porter died in Morristown, New Jersey, and is buried in Green-Wood Cemetery, Brooklyn, New York. His grave can be found in Section 54, Lot 5685/89.

== Legacy ==
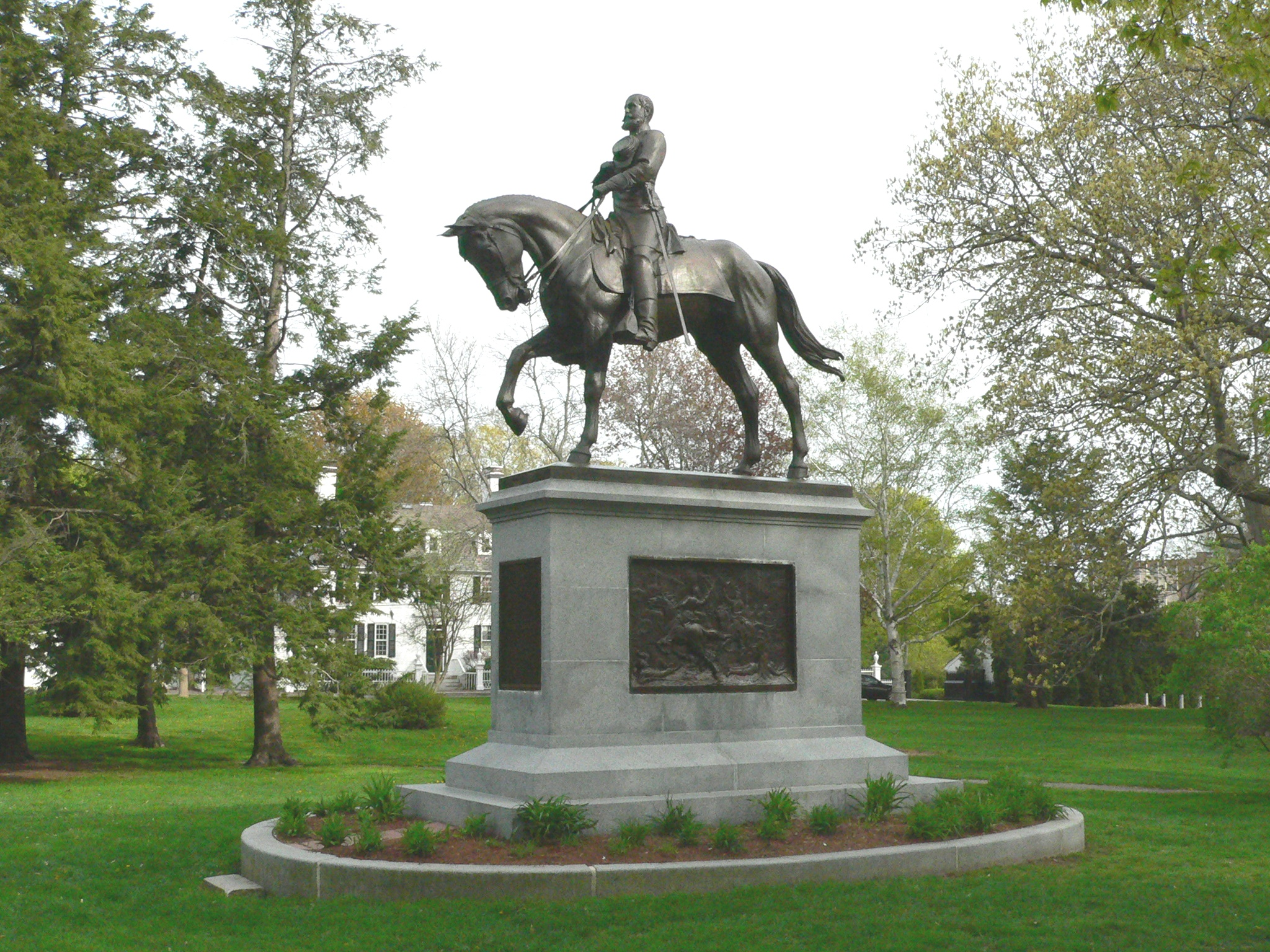
a Statue of Porter in Haven Park, Portsmouth, New Hampshire

- In 1862, Camp Fitz-John Porter was established in Monroe County, NY, one mile south of Rochester, NY, on the western bank of the Genesee River. The camp was the mustering location for the 108th New York Volunteer Infantry Regiment the 140th New York Volunteer Infantry Regiment and Mack's 18th Independent "Black Horse" artillery battery. In 2008 a historical marker was erected to mark the location. 43°08′7.6″N 77°37′14.3″W
- In 1904, a statue of Porter designed by artist James E. Kelly was dedicated in Haven Park in Portsmouth, New Hampshire.
- In World War II, the United States Liberty ship SS FitzJohn Porter was named in his honor.
- Porterstown Road in the town by the same name runs directly through the area where his forces were placed for the Battle of Sharpsburg.
- His Portsmouth home is listed on the National Register of Historic Places

== See also ==
- List of American Civil War generals (Union)
- List of people pardoned or granted clemency by the president of the United States

== Bibliography ==
- Dupuy, Trevor N., Curt Johnson, and David L. Bongard. Harper Encyclopedia of Military Biography. New York: HarperCollins, 1992. ISBN 978-0-06-270015-5.
- Eicher, John H., and David J. Eicher. Civil War High Commands. Stanford, CA: Stanford University Press, 2001. ISBN 0-8047-3641-3.
- Grant, U. S. "An Undeserved Stigma" in North American Review, Vol. 135, No. 313, December 1882, pp. 536–46.
- McPherson, James M. Battle Cry of Freedom: The Civil War Era. Oxford History of the United States. New York: Oxford University Press, 1988. ISBN 0-19-503863-0.
- Sears, Stephen W. Landscape Turned Red: The Battle of Antietam. Boston: Houghton Mifflin, 1983. ISBN 0-89919-172-X.
- Porter biography, Civil War Home
- Court Martial of Porter, Civil War Home

=== Further reading ===
- Eisenschiml, Otto, The Celebrated Case of Fitz John Porter: An American Dreyfus Affair, Indianapolis, IN: Bobbs-Merrill, 1950.
- Marvel, William. Radical Sacrifice: The Rise and Ruin of Fitz John Porter. Chapel Hill: University of North Carolina Press, 2021. ISBN 978-1-4696-8843-5.
- Hennessy, John J. Return to Bull Run: The Campaign and Battle of Second Manassas. Norman: University of Oklahoma Press, 1993. ISBN 0-8061-3187-X.
- Soini, Wayne. Porter's Secret: Fitz John Porter's Monument Decoded. Portsmouth, New Hampshire: Jetty House an imprint of Peter E. Randall Publisher, 2011. ISBN 978-0-9828236-8-2.
- Paleno, Gene. "The Porter Conspiracy, A story of the Civil War", PAL Publishing, Upper Lake CA (ISBN 978-0-9894847-4-9)
- Porter, Fitz-John; Grant, Ulysses S. (1869). Appeal to the President of the United States for a re-examination of the proceedings of the general court martial in his case. Morristown, N.J.

Preceded by Nathaniel P. Banks	Commander of the Fifth Army Corps; May 18, 1862 - November 10, 1862	Succeeded by Joseph Hooker
