= 8th Pennsylvania Reserve Regiment =

Union Army infantry regiment

- Pennsylvania flag
- Active: July, 1861 to May 24, 1864
- Country: United States
- Allegiance: Union
- Branch: Infantry
- Part of: 1st Brigade, 2nd Division, I Corps, Army of the Potomac March to June 1862; 2nd Brigade, 3rd Division, V Corps June to August 1862; 2nd Brigade, 3rd Division, 3rd Corps, Army of Virginia August to September 1862; 2nd Brigade, 3rd Division, V Corps, Army of the Potomac, September 1862 to February 1863; 2nd Brigade, Pennsylvania Reserves Corps, XXII Corps, Department of Washington, February 1863 to April 1864; 3rd Brigade, 3rd Division, V Corps, Army of the Potomac, April to May 1864
- Engagements: Battle of Mechanicsville; Battle of South Mountain; Battle of Fredericksburg; Battle of Spotsylvania Court House

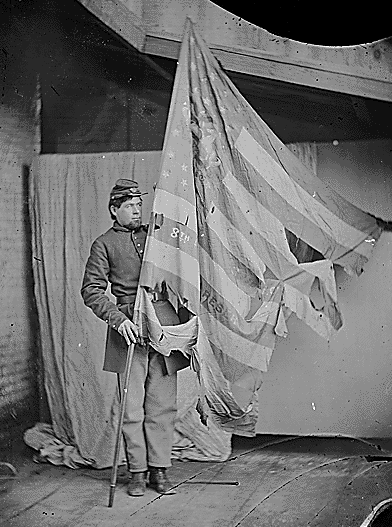
Flag of the 8th Pennsylvania Reserve

The 8th Pennsylvania Reserve Regiment, also known as the 37th Pennsylvania Volunteer Infantry Regiment, was an infantry regiment that served in the Union Army as part of the Pennsylvania Reserves infantry division during the American Civil War.

== History ==
The regiment was organized at Camp Wilkins near Pittsburgh, Pennsylvania in July 1861. George S. Hays served as colonel, S. D. Oliphant as lieutenant colonel, and J. B. Gardner as major. After training, it was sent to Washington, D.C. in late July, where it was assigned to the 1st Brigade of the Pennsylvania Reserves division, which became the Second Division, I Corps, Army of the Potomac. In May, it followed the rest of the division to the Peninsula, where the division became the Third Division, V Corps. On May 23, Gardner resigned and Captain S. M. Baily of company I was promoted to major in his place.

The regiment first came under fire at the Battle of Mechanicsville, where it lost nearly 100 men. When the rest of the army withdrew, Company F of the 8th Reserve, which had been sent forward as skirmishers, was not informed of the retreat and was left behind and captured by the Confederates. It also fought at the battles of Charles City Cross Roads and Glendale, losing over 200 additional men. After the regiment arrived at Harrison's Landing, both Hays and Oliphant resigned due to illness. Baily was promoted to colonel, Captain Lemon to lieutenant colonel, and Captain Robert E. Johnston to major.

The Pennsylvania Reserves Division was sent to the Army of Virginia in August as part of the III Corps. The 8th Reserve fought at the Second Battle of Bull Run, where it lost 52 out of 100 men, and again at South Mountain, where it lost another 54 men. At the Battle of Antietam, it fought on the Union right in the Cornfield, losing twelve killed and forty three wounded. It played a part in the Union breakthrough on the Confederate right at the Battle of Fredericksburg but lost heavily, especially in officers. Twenty-eight were killed, eighty-six wounded, and twenty-two captured. Baily, five captains, and five lieutenants were among the wounded. In February 1863, the regiment was ordered to Washington, where it was rested and brought back up to strength.

In the spring of 1864, the 8th Reserve, along with the rest of the division, was sent back to the army, as the Third Division, V Corps. It fought in the initial battles of the Overland Campaign, losing thirty three men at the Battle of the Wilderness and another nineteen at the Battle of Spotsylvania Court House. On May 17, it was relieved from duty since its term of service had expired. Those whose enlistments had not expired yet were transferred to the 191st Pennsylvania Infantry. The remainder of the regiment was sent back to Pittsburgh, where on May 24, it was mustered out of service.

One of the members of the regiment who continued to serve after the war, John A. Wiley, attained the rank of major general as commander of the 28th Infantry Division.

== Organization ==
Company	Moniker	Primary Location of Recruitment	Captains
A	The Armstrong Rifles	Armstrong County	L.S. Cantwell
B	The Jefferson Riflemen	Dauphin County	Robert E. Johnson
C	The Anderson Cadets	Allegheny County	George S. Hays
D	The Brownsville Greys	Fayette County	C.L. Connor
E	The Duncan Guards	Philadelphia and Allegheny County	John Duncan
F	The Hopewell Rifles	Bedford County	John Eichelberger
G	The Fayette Guards	Fayette County	Jesse B. Gardner
H	The Clarion Union Guards	Clarion County	William Lemon
I	The Greene County Rangers	Greene County	Silas M. Baily
K	The Hopkins Infantry	Washington County	Alex Wishart

== Casualties ==
The 8th Pennsylvania Reserves suffered 5 officers and 153 enlisted men killed and mortally wounded in battle, and 68 enlisted men dead from disease, for a total of 226 fatalities.

== See also ==
- Pennsylvania Reserves
- Pennsylvania in the Civil War
