= General Porter House =

Historic house in New Hampshire, United States

- U.S. National Register of Historic Places
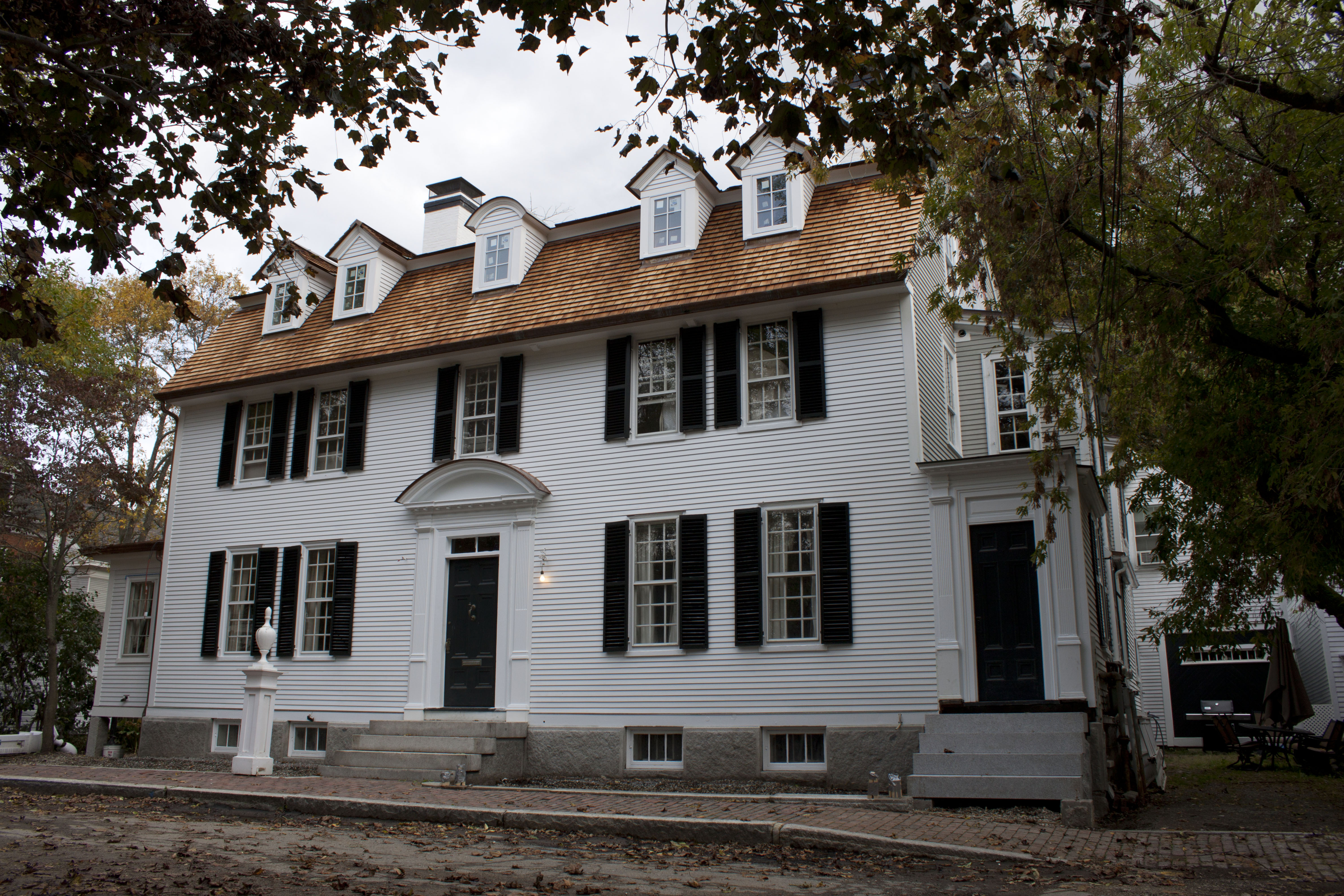

- Location within New Hampshire Location within the United States
- Location: 32-34 Livermore St., Portsmouth, New Hampshire
- Coordinates: 43°4′24″N 70°45′16″W
- Area: 0.2 acres (0.081 ha)
- Built: 1751
- Architectural style: Georgian
- NRHP reference No.: 85003359
- Added to NRHP: October 11, 1985

The General Porter House is a historic house at 32-34 Livermore Street in Portsmouth, New Hampshire. Built about 1751, it is a well-preserved example of a Portsmouth gambrel-roofed double house, and has been home to a number of prominent individuals. Now housing residential condominiums, it was listed on the National Register of Historic Places in 1985.

== Description and history ==
The General Porter House is located on the east side of Livermore Street, a short residential street facing Haven Park south of downtown Portsmouth. It is a 2 1/2-story wood-frame structure, with a gambrel roof and clapboarded exterior. A "Portsmouth double house", it is five bays wide and two deep, with additions on either side, and an ell to the rear. The main entrance is at the center of the facade, topped by a rounded pediment and flanked by pilasters. The roof is pierced by five dormers, all but the center one with gabled roofs. The center one matches the entry trim in having a rounded roof. The right-side projecting has a secondary entrance, also flanked by pilasters.

The house was built c. 1751 by Matthew Livermore, who was New Hampshire's first formally-educated lawyer, and was a representative to New Hampshire's provisional government during the American Revolutionary War. The house has been moved twice, both times in the 19th century. Another major owner was Samuel Coues, a leader of the shipbuilding industry in Portsmouth during the 19th century, and leader of the American Peace Party in the 1840s. Its most recent notable resident was General Fitz John Porter, a United States Army general who served in the Mexican–American War and the American Civil War. The building was converted into condominiums in 1983, at which time the doorways were reconfigured, removing one in the left projection.

== See also ==
- National Register of Historic Places listings in Rockingham County, New Hampshire
