= Harper Encyclopedia of Military Biography =

1992 reference work

The Harper Encyclopedia of Military Biography (ISBN 978-0-06270-015-5) was written by Trevor N. Dupuy, Curt Johnson and David Bongard, and was issued in 1992 by HarperCollins Publishers. It contains more than three thousand short biographies of military figures from ancient times to 1990. Dennis E. Showalter, reviewing the work for the Library Journal said "the overall accuracy and perception of the biographical sketches earn this work a place in all collections on military history."
