= Battle of Gaines' Mill =

Major battle of the American Civil War

- Part of the American Civil War
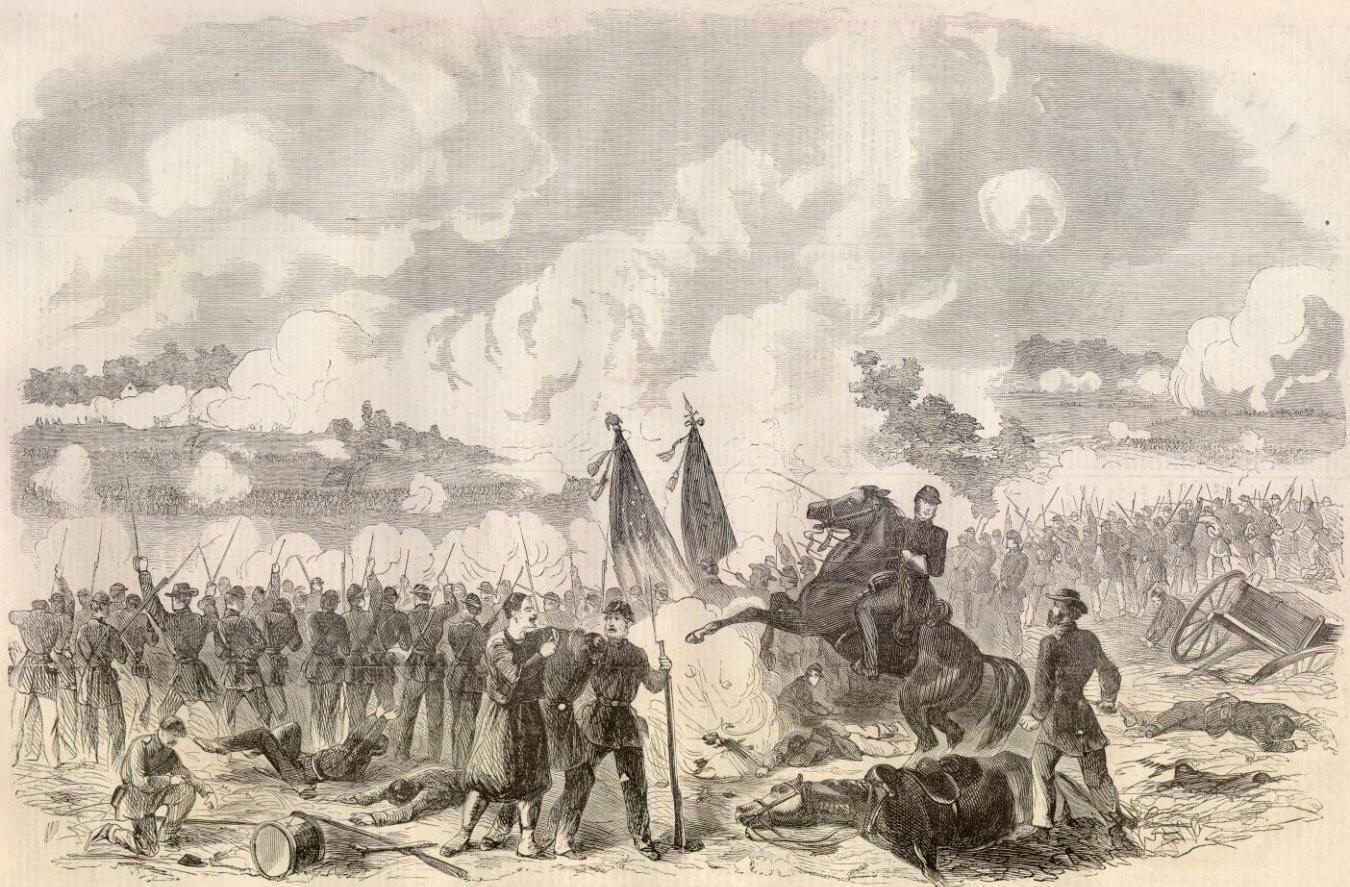
- Battle of Friday on the Chickahominy; Alfred R. Waud, artist, June 27, 1862. Newspaper illustration after the original sketch.
Date	June 27, 1862
Location	Hanover County, Virginia 37.5790°N 77.2872°W
Result	Confederate victory

Belligerents
Confederate States	United States (Union)

Commanders and leaders
(Confederate States of America) Robert E. Lee	(United States) George B. McClellan

Units involved
Army of Northern Virginia	Army of the Potomac

Strength
57,018	34,214

Casualties and losses
7,993 (1,483 killed, 6,402 wounded, 108 missing or captured)	7,337 (1,005 killed, 3,107 wounded, 3,236 missing or captured)

The Battle of Gaines' Mill, also known as the Battle of Chickahominy River, took place on June 27, 1862, in Hanover County, Virginia, as the third of the Seven Days Battles which together decided the outcome of the Union's Peninsula campaign of the American Civil War. Following the inconclusive Battle of Beaver Dam Creek (Mechanicsville) the previous day, Confederate General Robert E. Lee renewed his attacks against the right flank of the Union army, relatively isolated on the northern side of the Chickahominy River. There, Brig. Gen. Fitz John Porter's V Corps had established a strong defensive line behind Boatswain's Swamp. Lee's force was destined to launch the largest Confederate attack of the war, about 57,000 men in six divisions. Porter's reinforced V Corps held fast for the afternoon as the Confederates attacked in a disjointed manner, first with the division of Maj. Gen. A.P. Hill, then Maj. Gen. Richard S. Ewell, suffering heavy casualties. The arrival of Maj. Gen. Stonewall Jackson's command was delayed, preventing the full concentration of Confederate force before Porter received some reinforcements from the VI Corps.

At dusk, the Confederates finally mounted a coordinated assault that broke Porter's line and drove his men back toward the Chickahominy River. The Federals retreated across the river during the night. The Confederates were too disorganized to pursue the main Union force. Gaines' Mill saved Richmond for the Confederacy in 1862; the tactical defeat there convinced Army of the Potomac commander Maj. Gen. George B. McClellan to abandon his advance on Richmond and begin a retreat to the James River. The battle occurred in almost the same location as the Battle of Cold Harbor nearly two years later.

== Background ==
=== Military situation ===
McClellan's Army of the Potomac had pushed to within a few miles of the Confederate capital of Richmond and had stalled following the Battle of Seven Pines in late May 1862. Lee wanted to take the initiative, believing that remaining on the strategic defensive would play into Union hands and allow the Confederacy to be worn down. He planned to shift his 90,000-man Confederate army to the north of Richmond, and attack McClellan's right flank. The Confederate cavalry under the command of Maj. Gen. J.E.B. Stuart had ridden around McClellan's army, confirming that the flank was open—not anchored on Totopotomoy Creek—and vulnerable. Lee planned to use Maj. Gen. Stonewall Jackson's force, transported by rail from the Shenandoah Valley, to attack on McClellan's right and rear, while the remainder of his army under Maj. Gens. A.P. Hill, James Longstreet, and D.H. Hill attacked from the direction of Mechanicsville.

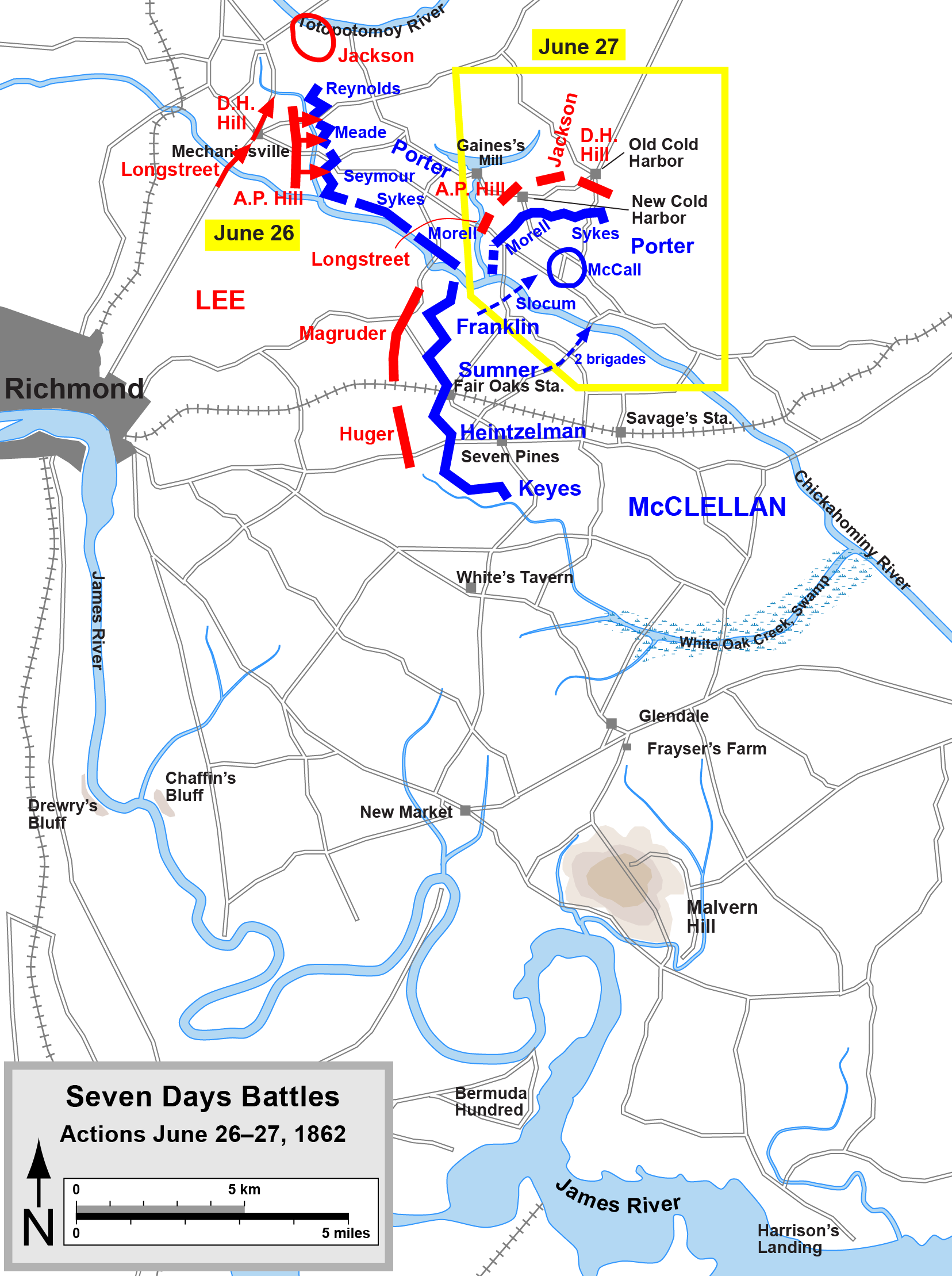
Seven Days Battles, June 26–27, 1862 Confederate Union

The Seven Days Battles began with a Union attack in the minor Battle of Oak Grove on June 25, but the first major battle started the next day when Lee launched a large-scale assault against McClellan at the Battle of Beaver Dam Creek (or Mechanicsville). Lee attacked Porter's V Corps north of the Chickahominy, while the bulk of the Union Army was relatively unoccupied south of the river. Although this battle was a tactical victory for the Union, McClellan realized that he could not keep Porter's corps in place with Jackson threatening his flank. He ordered Porter to begin a withdrawal and at the same time decided to change the army's base of supply from White House on the Pamunkey River to Harrison's Landing on the James River. (This decision was fatal to McClellan's campaign because by abandoning the railroad that led from the Pamunkey, he would no longer be able to supply his planned siege of Richmond with the necessary heavy artillery.)

Several of McClellan's subordinates urged him to attack the Confederate division of Maj. Gen. John B. Magruder south of the Chickahominy, but he feared the vast numbers of Confederates he believed to be before him and failed to capitalize on the overwhelming superiority he actually held on that front. Magruder assisted in this misapprehension by ordering frequent, noisy movements of small units back and forth and by using groups of slaves with drums to simulate large marching columns. Furthermore, the Union Army Balloon Corps, which had performed the only aerial observation during the Peninsula Campaign, was now joined by a Confederate competitor. Capt. Langdon Cheves of South Carolina had constructed a multicolored balloon of dress silk obtained from Charleston and Savannah, which sailed aloft tethered to a boxcar on the York River Railroad, manned by Maj. Edward Porter Alexander. The appearance of this balloon reinforced McClellan's fear that the Confederates were planning for an offensive against his left flank. For the second day, the Confederates were able to continue fooling McClellan south of the river by employing minor diversionary attacks to command the attention of 60,000 Federal troops while the heavier action occurred north of the river.

The order to Porter's corps came just before dawn and they did not have adequate time to prepare a strong rear guard for the withdrawal, resulting in numerous men from Brig. Gen. George A. McCall's division being captured by the advancing Confederates. Porter selected a new defensive line on a plateau behind Boatswain's Swamp, just to the southeast of a mill owned by Dr. William F. Gaines. It was a strong position, with two divisions laid out in a semicircle—Brig. Gen. George W. Morell on the left and Brig. Gen. George Sykes on the right—and two divisions in reserve—Brig. Gen. George A. McCall and Brig. Gen. Henry W. Slocum, the latter on loan to Porter from Brig. Gen. William B. Franklin's VI Corps. Slocum's division had not crossed the river by the start of the battle, held up by McClellan's concern about an impending attack on Franklin's front.

Lee's offensive plan for June 27 was similar to that of the preceding day. He would use A.P. Hill's and Longstreet's divisions to pressure Porter's corps as it withdrew, while Stonewall Jackson, augmented by D.H. Hill (Jackson's brother-in-law), hit Porter's right and rear. The combined effort of all of Lee's force was destined to be the largest Confederate attack of the war, about 57,000 men in six divisions. Lee traveled to Walnut Grove Church to meet with Jackson and describe the plan, which called for Jackson to march toward Old Cold Harbor, and then south beyond Porter's flank. Unfortunately, Lee made incorrect assumptions about Porter's disposition. He assumed that the V Corps would defend the line of Powhite Creek, somewhat to the west of Porter's actual location.

== Battle ==
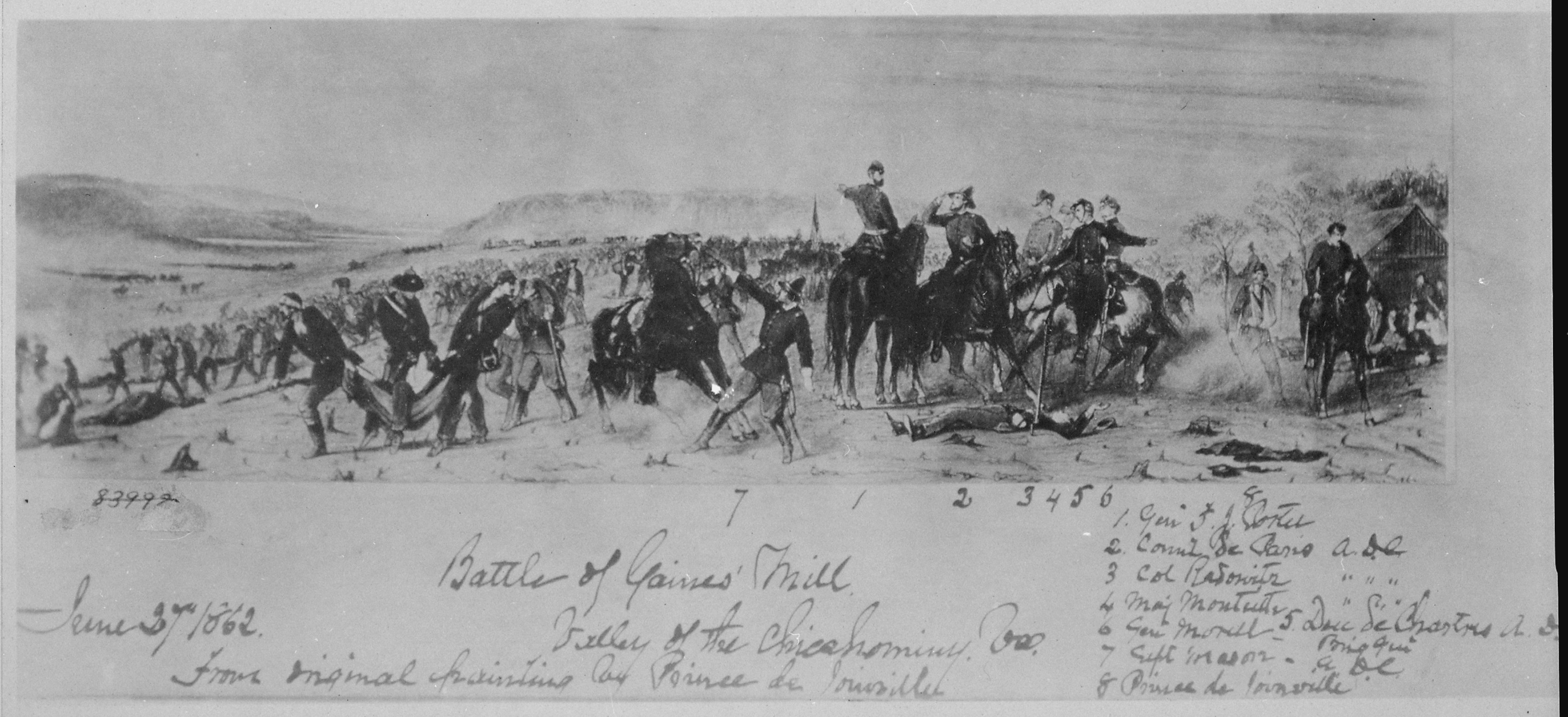
"Battle of Gaines Mill, Valley of the Chickahominy, Virginia, June 27, 1862." Records of the Office of the Chief Signal Officer, 1860–1985.

The first actions of the battle occurred between noon and 1 p.m. on June 27 after D.H. Hill's division reached Old Cold Harbor, where it was scheduled to link up with Stonewall Jackson's command. Hill pushed through the crossroads with two brigades, which encountered unexpected infantry fire. Seeking to suppress the fire, he brought forward the Jeff Davis Battery from Alabama, but it was soon outgunned by two six-gun batteries manned by U.S. regulars from Brig. Gen. George Sykes's division. Hill was surprised at the level of resistance and also that he seemed to be meeting the front of the Union force, not the expected flank, so he determined to wait for Jackson's arrival before moving further. The noise from this engagement failed to reach General Lee at his headquarters, the house owned by William Hogan, named "Selwyn".

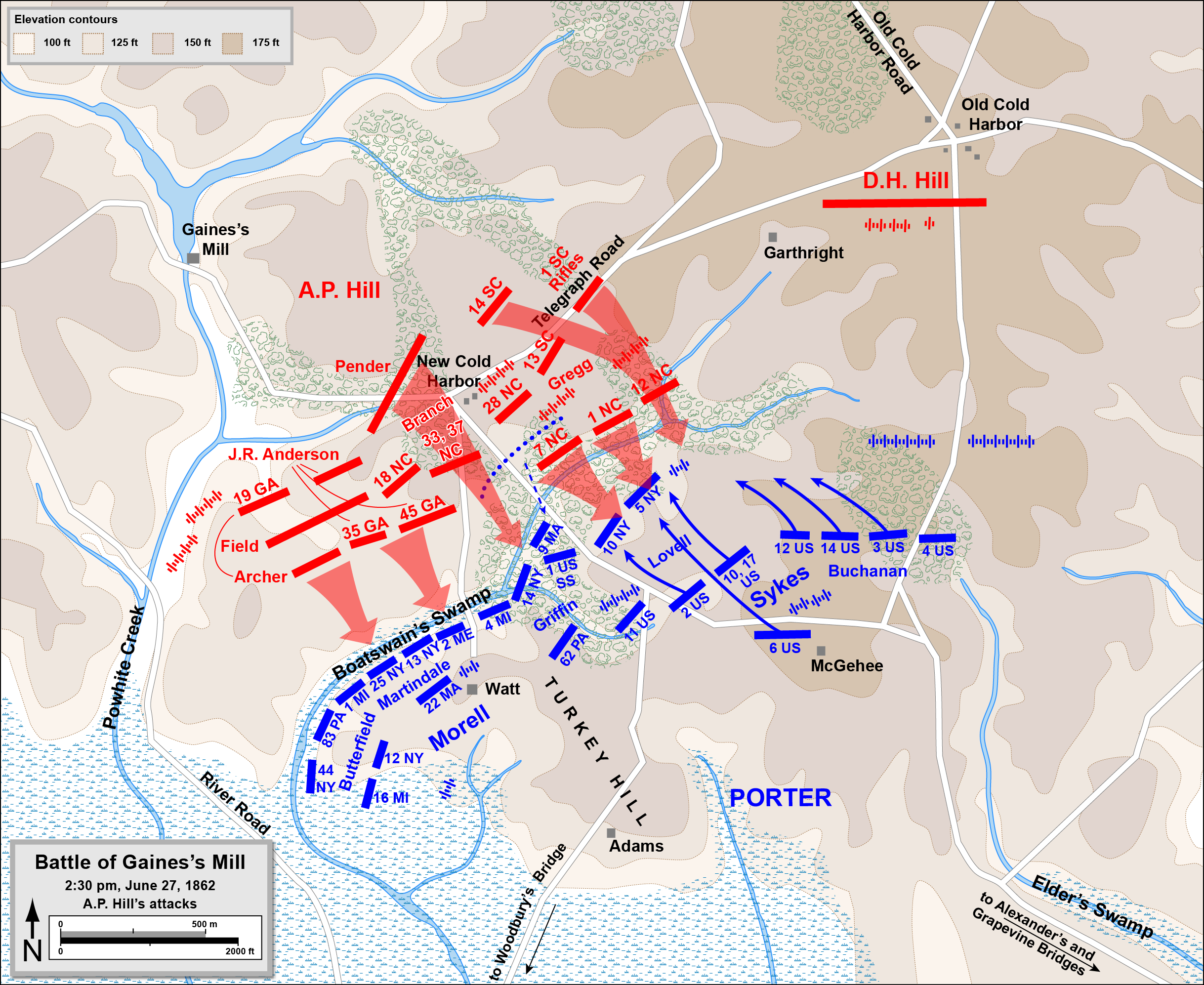
A.P. Hill's attack

A.P. Hill's division had moved across Beaver Dam Creek early in the morning, finding the former Union line lightly defended. As they proceeded eastward and approached Gaines' Mill at about the time that D.H. Hill's men were engaged, Porter formally asked McClellan to send Slocum's division across the Chickahominy over Alexander's Bridge to support him. Hill directed the brigades of Maxcy Gregg and Lawrence O'Bryan Branch to spearhead the assault, as they had not been engaged at Beaver Dam Creek and were well-rested. Gregg was held up by skirmishers from Col. Hiram Berdan's 1st U.S. Sharpshooters and the 9th Massachusetts Infantry. By early afternoon, he had run into strong opposition by Porter, deployed along Boatswain's Creek, and the swampy terrain was a major obstacle against the advance. A particularly bloody engagement occurred as the 1st South Carolina Rifles attacked a Massachusetts battery, but were repulsed by Zouaves of the 5th New York, which inflicted 57% casualties (76 killed, 221 wounded, and 58 missing) on the South Carolinians, the greatest Confederate regimental losses of the day. Branch's brigade fared no better, losing 401 men in two hours of fighting. Following behind them, Joseph R. Anderson's brigade launched three assaults on the Union lines without putting a dent in them. Field's brigade became bogged down in the swamp, and some of the men in the rear ended up firing into their comrades. Some of Gregg's men reached the other side of the creek; none of the rest came close.

Instead of pursuing a fleeing enemy, as his orders had directed, A.P. Hill attacked an entrenched Union position, losing about 2,000 of his 13,200 men in the failed attempt. Combined with his attacks at Mechanicsville the previous day, the Light Division had lost over a quarter of its men. General McClellan was encouraged by the telegrams Porter had sent back to his headquarters a few miles to the rear. He replied, "If the enemy are retiring and you are a chasseur, pitch in." He also told Franklin to cross the river over the Duane bridge and attack the enemy's flank if he saw a chance, but he was dismayed to hear that the VI Corps commander had destroyed the bridge for fear of a possible enemy attack. At the same time, Brig. Gen. Edwin V. Sumner of the II Corps reported enemy activity in his front. McClellan's optimism was dashed, and he ordered that his headquarters' equipment be packed up in preparation for the retreat. On the Confederate side, General Lee had been an active participant in the failed assault, rallying his troops too close to the front for their comfort. As Longstreet arrived to the southwest of A.P. Hill, he saw the difficulty of attacking over such terrain and delayed until Stonewall Jackson could attack on Hill's left.

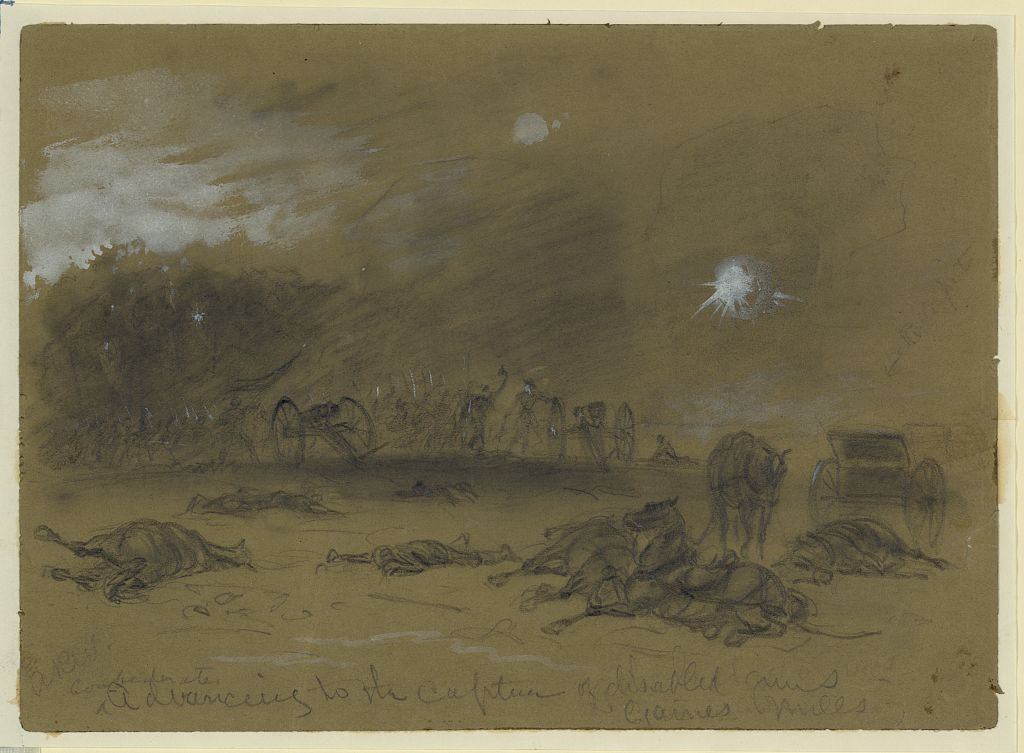
Confederates advancing to the capture of disabled guns at Gaines Mills, by Alfred Waud

For the second time in the Seven Days, however, Jackson was late. A guide from the 4th Virginia Cavalry, Pvt. John Henry Timberlake, had misunderstood Jackson's intent and led him down the wrong road. After they counter-marched, losing about an hour, Jackson's troops found the road to Old Cold Harbor obstructed by trees felled by the retreating Union army and were harassed by sharpshooters, delaying their arrival. The first of Jackson's command to reach the battlefield was the division of Maj. Gen. Richard S. Ewell, who was met by Lee's aide, Walter Taylor, and instructed to move into action immediately. Lee was concerned that Porter would counterattack the weakened troops of A.P. Hill, so he ordered Longstreet to conduct a diversionary attack to stabilize the lines until Jackson's full command could arrive and attack from the north. In Longstreet's attack, Brig. Gen. George E. Pickett's brigade attempted a frontal assault and was beaten back under severe fire with heavy losses. Pickett himself took a bullet to the shoulder, putting him out of action for the rest of the summer; Col. Eppa Hunton of the 8th Virginia assumed command of the brigade. Confederate President Jefferson Davis was among the party witnessing Pickett's failed attempt.

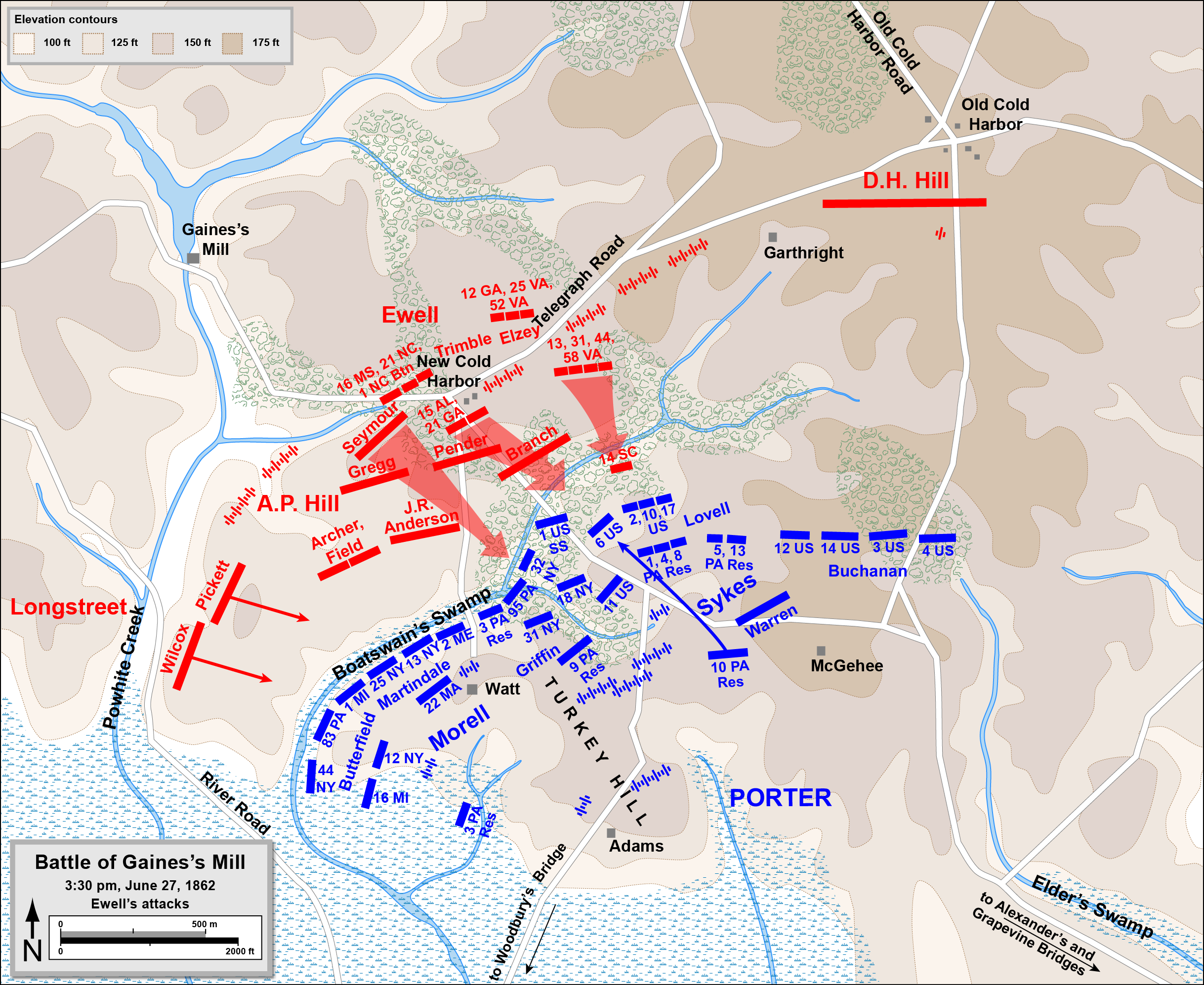
Ewell's attack

Ewell began his attack immediately, around 3:30 p.m., without waiting for his entire division to come on line. General Lee's instructions were to advance along the same axis used by the brigades of Gregg and Branch, to maintain the momentum of the attack. He sent in his lead brigade, Louisianans under Col. Isaac Seymour, commanding in Maj. Gen. Richard Taylor's absence for medical reasons. Seymour was relatively inexperienced and his troops became confused in the woods and bogs of Boatswain's Swamp. Their confusion increased when Col. Seymour was killed by a Union rifle volley. Maj. Roberdeau Wheat, the colorful leader of the Louisiana Tigers Battalion, moved to the front to lead the brigade, but he was also killed with a bullet through his head. The Louisiana Brigade withdrew from the battle. Ewell's attack continued with two regiments from the brigade of Brig. Gen. Isaac R. Trimble, but they could not advance beyond the swamp, falling with about 20% casualties. Porter was starting to receive reinforcements from Slocum's division and he brought forward troops to feed into gaps in his line. However, despite telegrams from Porter for more assistance, General McClellan gave no thought to the advantages of a counterattack. He asked his corps commanders south of the river whether they had any troops they could spare. When no one volunteered, he directed Sumner of the II Corps to send two brigades—about one tenth of the army—across the river, but because of the distances involved they would not reach the scene for another three hours.

When Stonewall Jackson finally reached Old Cold Harbor, weary from the marching and counter-marching, he began to arrange his troops and those of D.H. Hill to trap the Federals he expected to be driven east by Longstreet and A.P. Hill. He soon received instructions from General Lee that informed him of the current situation and he began to prepare his command to assault the main Federal line. Faulty staff work prevented his men from moving forward for over an hour. While Jackson rode back and forth distractedly, his chaplain and chief of staff, Maj. Robert L. Dabney, took the initiative to find the divisions of Brig. Gens. William H. C. Whiting and Charles S. Winder and corrected the garbled instructions they had received. Lee met with Jackson on Telegraph Road and expressed his annoyance at the delay in getting to the battlefield by telling him "General, I am glad to see you and I only wish I could have been with you sooner." Jackson muttered a reply that was inaudible under the noise of the battle. Lee then asked Jackson if his troops could stand the heavy enemy fire. "They can stand anything, they can stand that," Jackson replied.

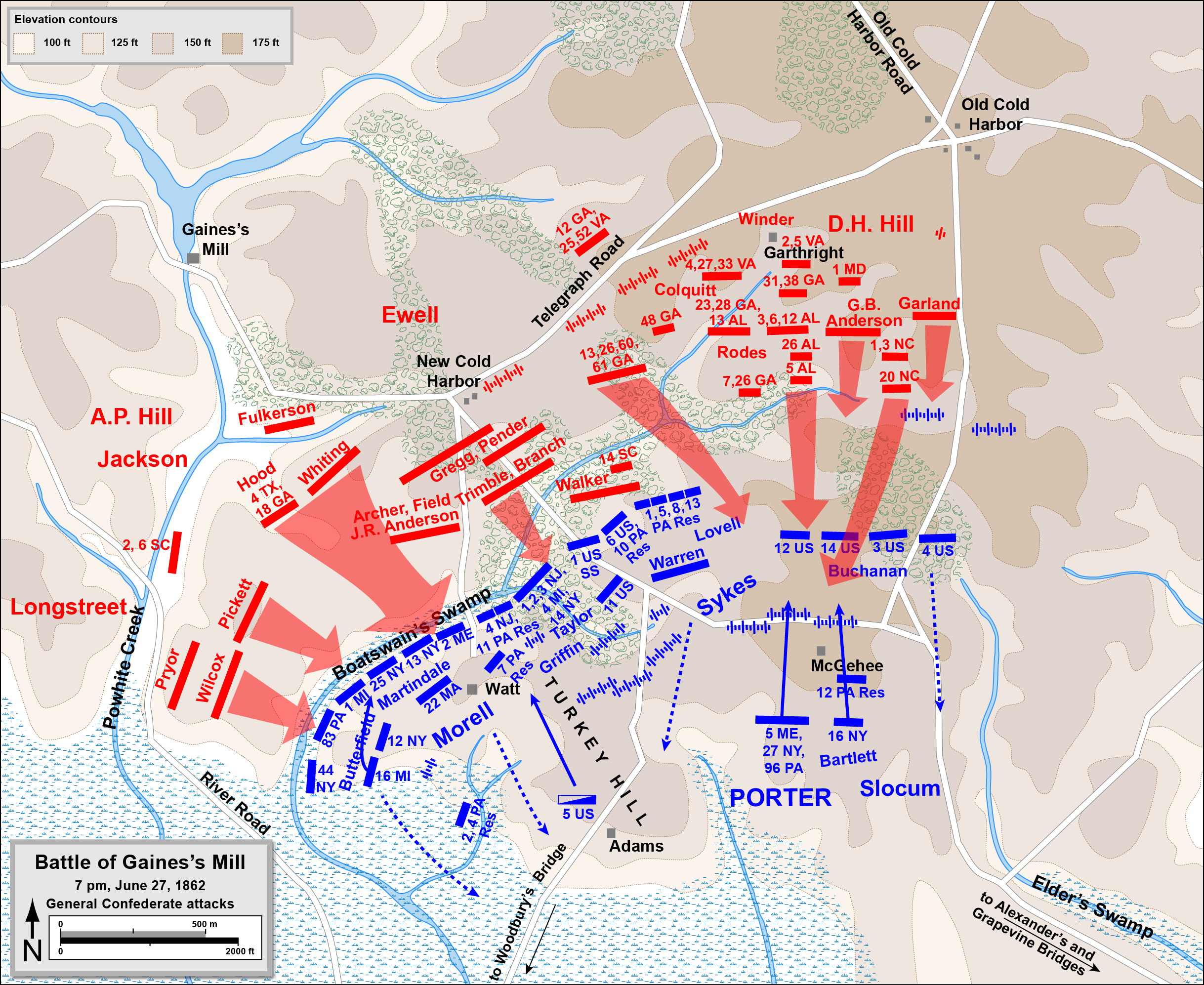
General Confederate attack

Lee's assault at 7 p.m. was conducted by 16 brigades, about 32,100 men. Porter had about 34,000 men to defend the line, but many of these were worn out from the previous attacks and command cohesion was hampered by feeding isolated reinforcements into the line to fill gaps. Nevertheless, they had the advantages of good defensible terrain and superiority in artillery. The Confederates were not able to advance simultaneously in a neat battle line over the 2.25-mile front, but rushed forward and were repulsed intermittently in smaller unit actions. On the Confederate left, D.H. Hill sent in his entire division except for Ripley's brigade, which had been badly mauled in the fighting at Beaver Dam Creek the previous day, but they encountered stiff resistance from George Sykes's regulars. The 20th North Carolina succeeded in overrunning a Union battery, its commander, Col. Alfred Iverson, who would later gain infamy at Gettysburg, was wounded in the assault. Meanwhile, the 5th Alabama's commander, Col. Charles Peuges, was mortally wounded and the regiment's colors captured by the 5th Maine. In the center were Brig. Gen Alexander Lawton's five Georgia regiments, a large new brigade in their first battle. Numbering close to 4000 men, the brigade was as big as the entire rest of Jackson's division. They pushed forward with the assistance of the Stonewall Brigade, along with Col. Samuel V. Fulkerson's brigade and Elzey's and Trimble's of Ewell's division. Jackson's division had the distinction of containing both the largest and smallest Confederate brigades on the field as his third brigade (temporarily commanded by Lt. Col Richard H. Cunningham since Brig. Gen John R. Jones was ill) numbered only a little over 1000 men, it was held in reserve and did not participate in the fighting. During the assault, Arnold Elzey was shot in the head, an injury that permanently removed him from active field command in the war and Col. James A. Walker of the 13th Virginia assumed command of Elzey's brigade. Samuel Fulkerson was shot in the chest and succumbed to his wound the next day. Col. Edward T.H. Warren of the 10th Virginia took command of the brigade. The Confederate right was opposed by the most difficult terrain, a quarter-mile open wheat field that sloped down to Boatswain's Swamp and then faced two lines of Union defenders on higher ground. James Longstreet ordered Pickett's brigade back into the action, supported by the brigades of Roger Pryor and Cadmus Wilcox, the other three brigades in the division being held in reserve. Longstreet wrote in his report, "I was, in fact, in the position from which the enemy wished us to attack him."

As the sun was starting to go down, William Whiting's division achieved the breakthrough on Longstreet's front. Brig. Gen. John Bell Hood's Texas Brigade moved forward swiftly and aggressively and broke a hole in the line. Four of the nine regimental commanders in Whiting's two brigades were killed or wounded, as well as Captain William Balthis, the division's chief of artillery. Pickett's brigade also succeeded in its second assault of the day. Confederate breakthroughs on their center and right could not be countered, and the Union line crumbled. A total of nine Union regimental commanders were killed or mortally wounded in the battle. Most of the 4th New Jersey, along with its colonel, were surrounded and taken prisoner by Longstreet's division; a lieutenant colonel assumed command of the remaining men in the regiment. Sykes's regulars conducted an orderly withdrawal from the McGehee house to Grapevine Bridge. The Union brigades of Brig. Gens. Thomas F. Meagher and William H. French arrived from the II Corps too late to help, other than as a rear guard for Porter's retreat. A battalion of the 5th U.S. Cavalry under Captain Charles J. Whiting made a desperate charge against the Texas Brigade, but were forced to surrender after heavy losses. By 4 a.m. on June 28, Porter had withdrawn across the Chickahominy, burning the bridges behind him. During the retreat from Gaines' Mill, Brig. Gen John F. Reynolds was also captured by the Confederates while sleeping under a tree.

== Aftermath ==
Gaines' Mill was an intense battle, the largest of the Seven Days and the only clear-cut Confederate tactical victory of the Peninsula Campaign. Union casualties from the 34,214 engaged were 6,837 (894 killed, 3,107 wounded, and 2,836 captured or missing). Of the 57,018 Confederates engaged, losses totaled 7,993 (1,483 killed, 6,402 wounded, 108 missing or captured) including the loss of three brigade commanders and one general officer. For comparison, no Union general officers were killed or wounded and only one brigade commander, Col. Warren, who remained on the field (the chief of McCall's artillery, Maj. Henry DeHart, was also mortally wounded). Since the Confederate assault was conducted against only a small portion of the Union Army (the V Corps (+), one third of the army), the army emerged from the battle in relatively good shape overall. Lee's victory, his first of the war, could have been more complete if it were not for the mishaps of Stonewall Jackson. Historian Stephen W. Sears speculates that were it not for Jackson's misdirected march and his poor staff work, the major assault that Lee unleashed at 7 p.m. could have occurred three or four hours earlier. This would have put Porter in grave jeopardy, without any last-minute reinforcements and the cover of darkness. He quotes Edward Porter Alexander, prominent Confederate artillery officer and postwar historian: "Had Jackson attacked when he first arrived, or during A.P. Hill's attack, we would have had an easy victory—comparatively, & would have captured most of Porter's command."

Although McClellan had already planned to shift his supply base to the James River, his defeat unnerved him and he precipitously decided to abandon his advance on Richmond and begin the retreat of his entire army to the James. Gaines' Mill and the Union retreat across the Chickahominy was a psychological victory for the Confederacy, signaling that Richmond was out of danger.

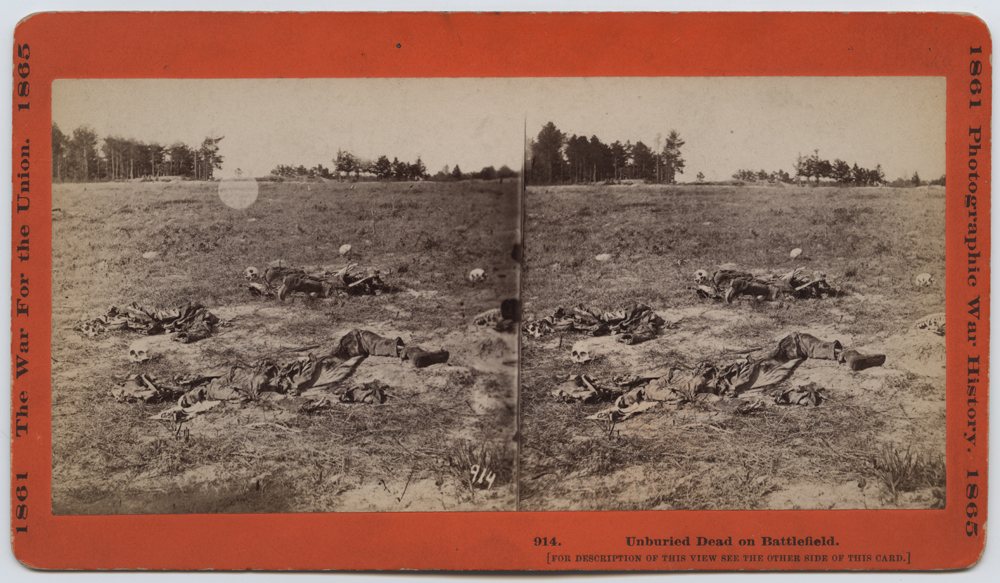
"Unburied Dead on Battlefield" by John Reekie; issued as Stero #914 being taken on the Battlefield of Gaines Mills aka First Cold Harbor April 1865; taken near the Adams Farm where 7th New York artillery was stationed June 1864 see Civil war Talk.

"Unburied Dead on Battlefield of Gaines Mills" by John Reekie; issued as Stero #916 see Library of Congress.

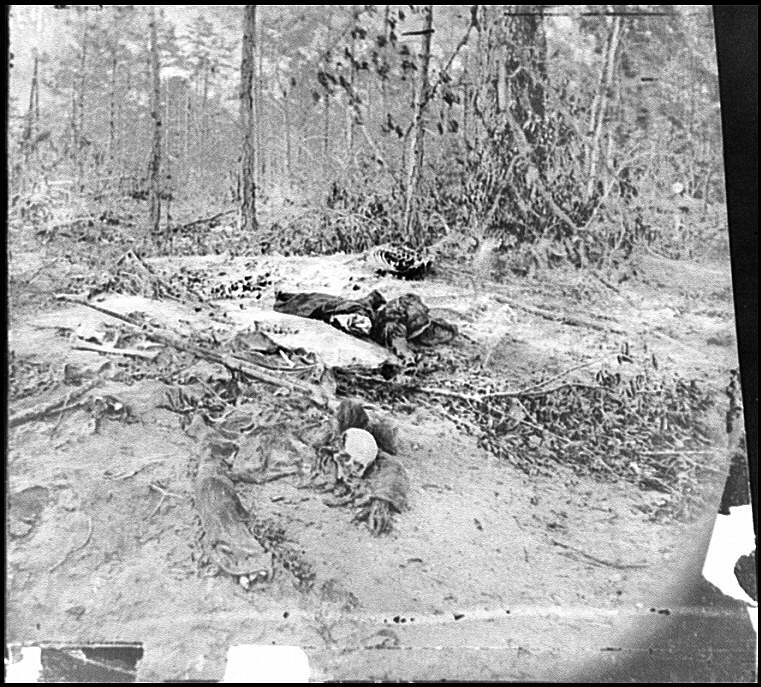
Right handed version of preceding photograph Stero #917

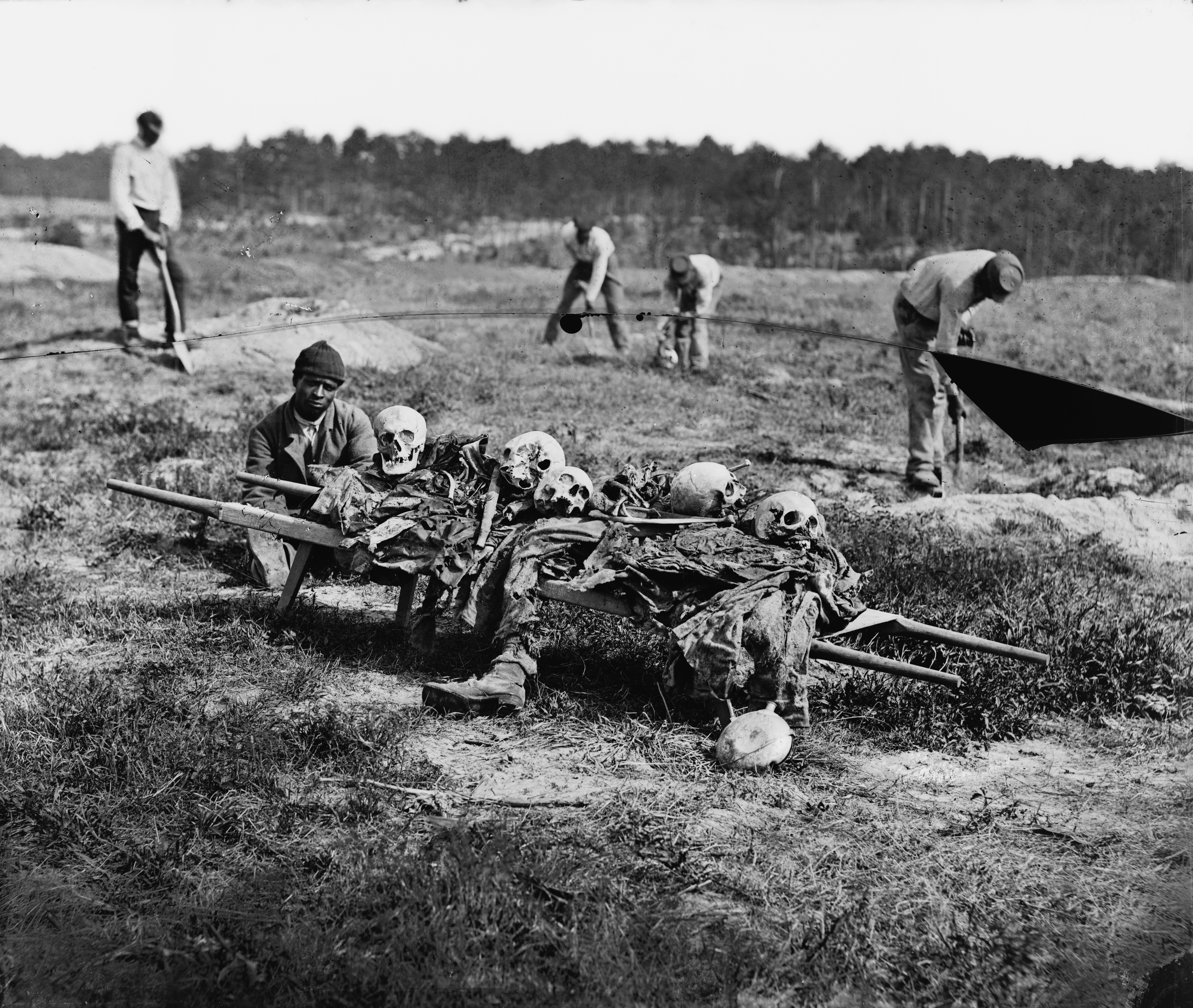
"African Americans collecting bones of soldiers killed at Cold Harbor (by John Reekie; issued as Stero #918, April 1865). Note part of a series:

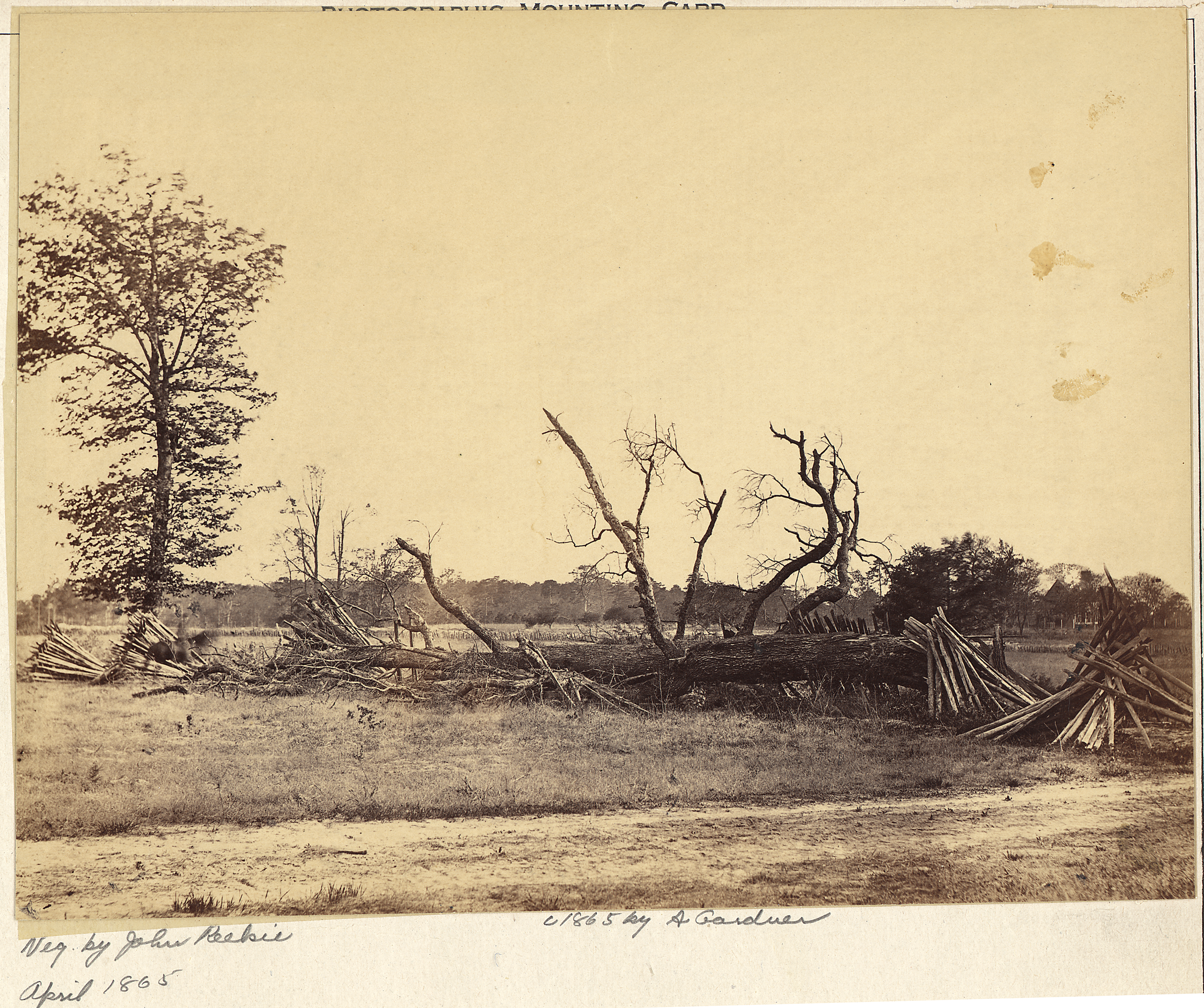
"Virginia, Cold harbor extreme Line of Confederate Works" An April 1865 John Reekie photograph

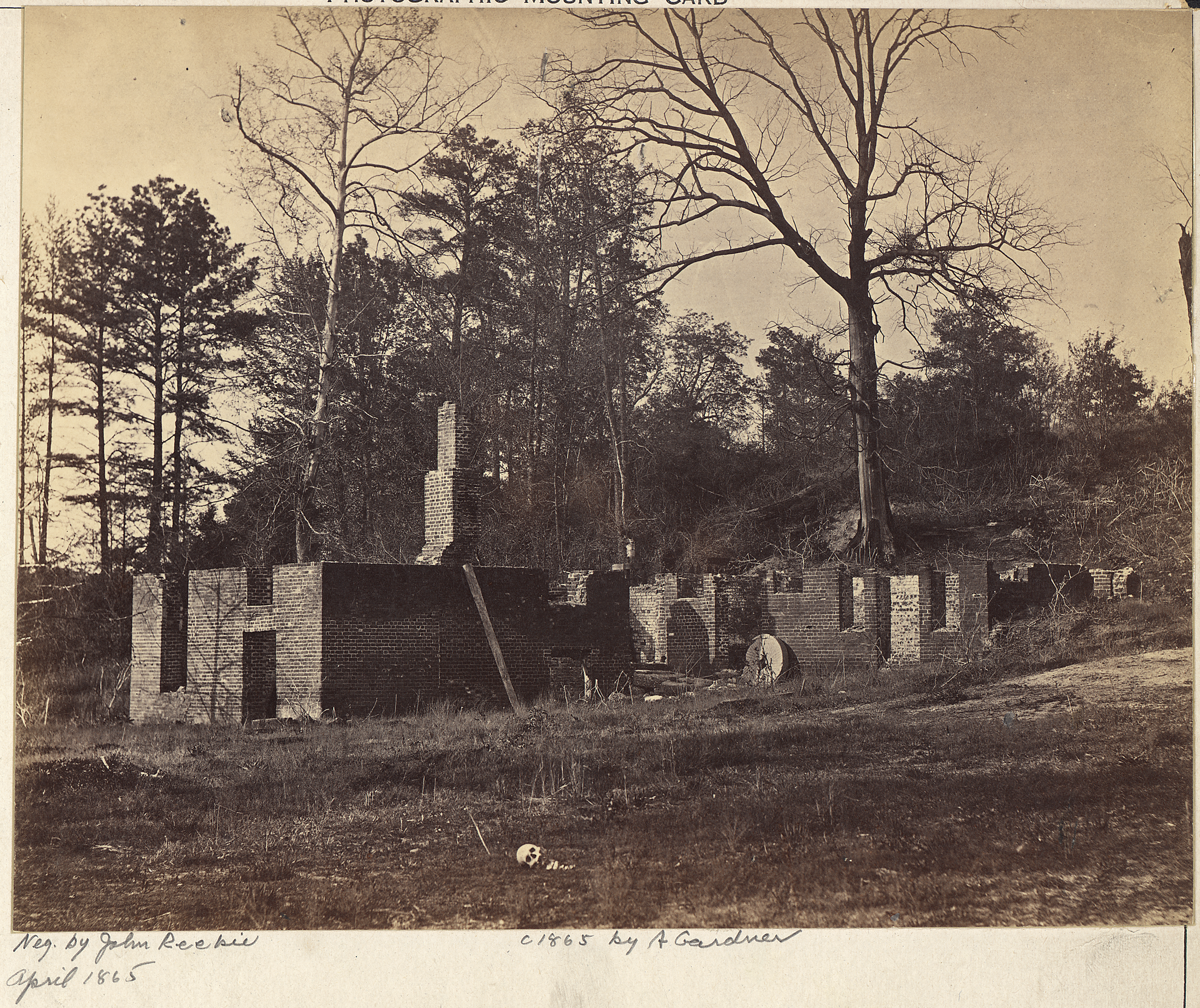
An April 1865 John Reekie photograph of the Ruins of Gaines' Mill showing remains of a soldier's grave in the foreground

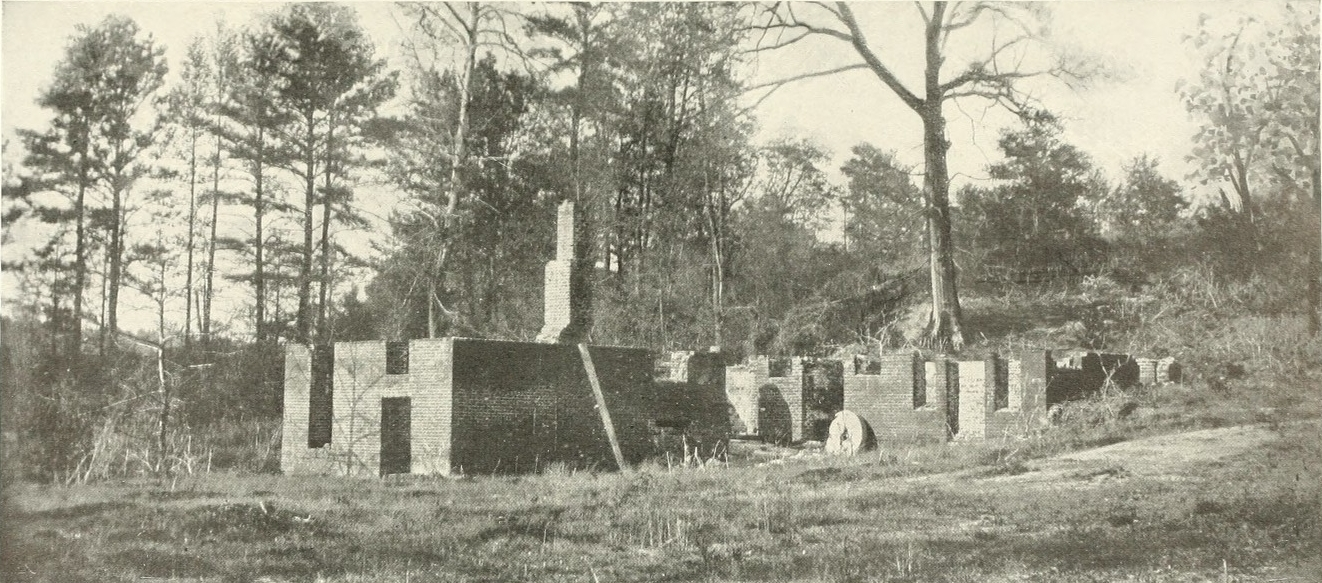
Ruins of Gaines' Mill

== Battlefield preservation ==
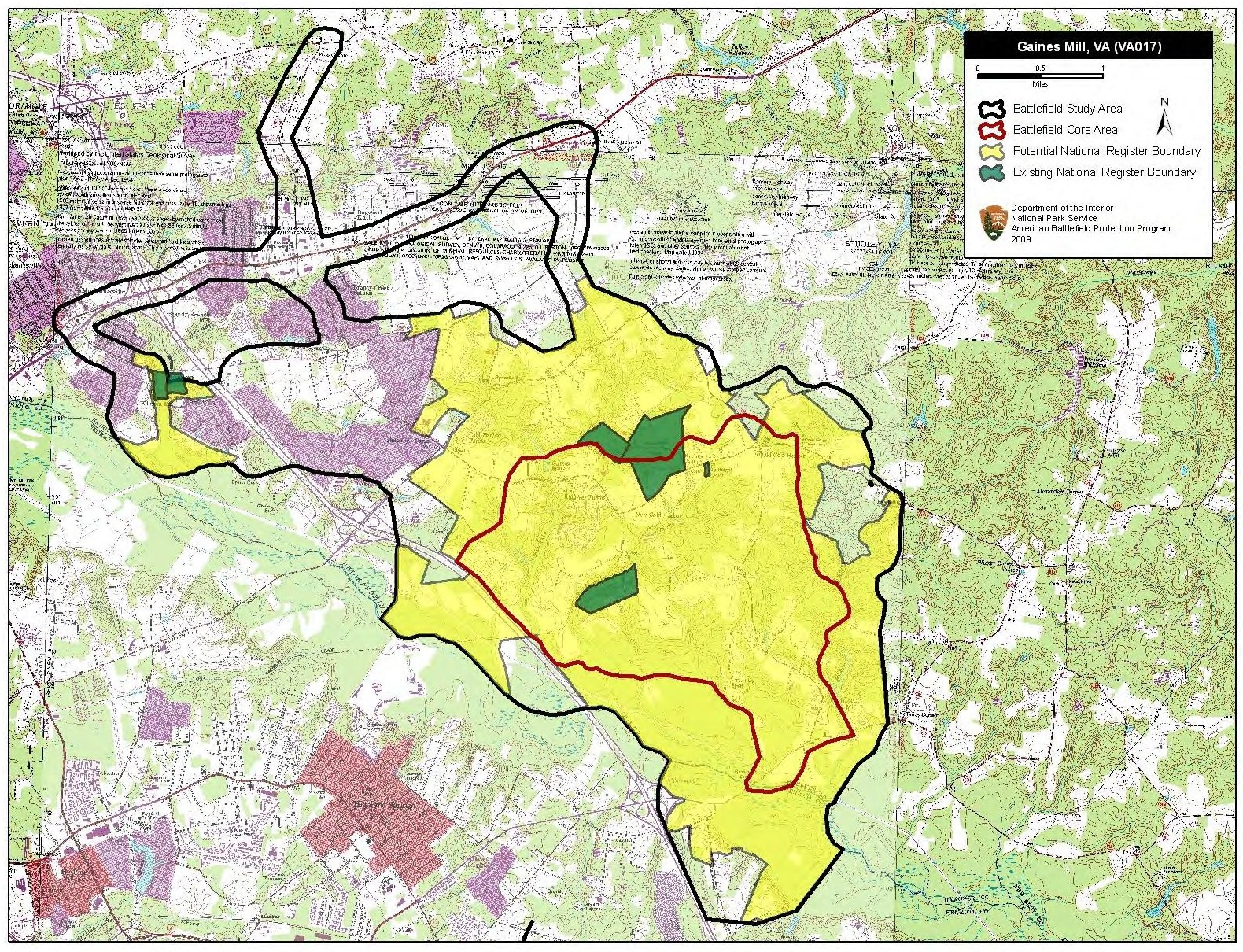
Map of Gaines' Mill Battlefield core and study areas by the American Battlefield Protection Program

The only preserved portion of the Gaines' Mill battlefield for nearly 150 years was a 60-acre section of the battlefield under National Park Service control around the Watt House. This tract is only a small fraction of the more than 2,000 acres that comprises the battlefield.

In 2011, two preservation efforts were completed by the Richmond Battlefields Association and the American Battlefield Trust, the first preservation successes at Gaines' Mill since before World War II. This new 285-acre "Longstreet Attack" tract greatly expanded the amount of preserved land at Gaines' Mill. The American Battlefield Trust and its partners have preserved a total of 932 acres (3.77 km^{2}) of the battlefield through land acquisitions or easements.

== See also ==
- Troop engagements of the American Civil War, 1862
- List of costliest American Civil War land battles
- Richmond in the Civil War
- Virginia in the American Civil War
- List of American Civil War battles
- List of Virginia Civil War units
