= List of American Civil War generals (Union) =

The following list shows the names of substantive, full grade general officers (Regular U.S. Army or U.S. Volunteers) effectively appointed, nominated, confirmed and commissioned (by signed and sealed document) who served in the Union Army during the American Civil War. Many commissions were antedated. Dates of rank were assigned for seniority purposes. Because of this, such "ranks" could be dated before the actual appointment, leading to confusion in some sources as to the actual effective date of the commission. This list currently shows the date of rank as the date of the promotion rather than the date of commission.

Officers receiving only brevet general appointments should be on the List of American Civil War brevet generals (Union) and not on this list. Brevet appointments went through the same process of appointment, nomination, confirmation and commission as the substantive grade officers. If a full grade brigadier general received a later brevet major general appointment, that appointment also may be placed in the notes on this list.

All but 58 brevet general appointments were made postwar but, just as many regular substantive grade appointments were backdated, many of the brevet grade appointments were backdated, mostly "to rank from" March 13, 1865. President Abraham Lincoln signed only 58 brevet general commissions before his death on April 15, 1865. Eicher notes that the odd order of grade (commission) date and rank date is especially present for brevet appointments which were actually issued mostly in 1866 to as late as 1869. Eicher also notes that most brevet appointments were backdated to March 13, 1865.

In addition to their names and grades, there is a small set of notes after every entry which may list Medal of Honor or Thanks of Congress citations, West Point graduation dates, important political or Army offices held, retirements or deaths during the war (whether in action or other means) and other unique facts pertaining to this article (i.e. youngest general, last surviving general, etc.). For all other information on their lives and accomplishments of these generals, please refer to their individual articles which have links from the list.

Note on abbreviations:

- MOH: Medal of Honor
- CSA: Confederate States Army
- DOW: Died of wounds
- GAR: Grand Army of the Republic
- KIA: Killed in action
- MOLLUS: Military Order of the Loyal Legion of the United States
- USA: United States Army (Regular Army) (appointment or brevet)
- USMA: United States Military Academy
- USN: United States Navy
- USV: United States Volunteers (appointment or brevet)
- VRC: Veteran Reserve Corps officer

== Union generals ==
Union Generals:	A	B	C	D	E	F	G	H	I	J	K	L	M	N	O	P	Q	R	S	T	U	V	W	X	Y	Z

=== A ===
Image	Name	Substantive rank	Brevet rank	Notes
	Abercrombie, John Joseph	Colonel, USA (February 25, 1861); Brigadier general, USV (August 31, 1861)	Brigadier general, USA (March 13, 1865)	USMA, 1822; Resigned June 24, 1865
	Allen, Robert	Colonel, USA (February 19, 1862); Brigadier general, USV (May 23, 1863)	Major general, USA (March 13, 1865); Major general, USV (March 13, 1865)	USMA, 1836
	Alvord, Benjamin	Major, USA (June 22, 1854); Brigadier general, USV (April 15, 1862)	Brigadier general, USA (April 9, 1865)	USMA, 1833
	Ames, Adelbert	Captain, USA (June 11, 1864); Brigadier general, USV (May 20, 1863)	Major general, USA (March 13, 1865); Major general, USV (January 15, 1865)	USMA, 1861; MOH, First Battle of Bull Run (July 21, 1861); Provisional Governor Mississippi (1868–1869); U.S. Senator from Mississippi (1870–1874); Governor of Mississippi (1875); Last surviving Union General of U.S. Regular Army, d. April 13, 1933; Son-in-law of Benjamin Franklin Butler
	Ammen, Jacob	Brigadier general, USV (July 16, 1862)		USMA, 1831; Resigned January 14, 1865
	Anderson, Robert	Brigadier general, USA (May 15, 1861)	Major general, USA (February 3, 1865)	USMA, 1825; Retired October 27, 1863
	Andrews, Christopher Columbus	Brigadier general, USV (January 5, 1864)	Major general, USV (March 9, 1865)	
	Andrews, George Leonard	Brigadier general, USV (November 10, 1862)	Major general, USV (March 26, 1865)	USMA, 1851; Resigned, 1855
	Arnold, Lewis Golding	Lieutenant colonel, USA (August 1, 1863); Brigadier general, USV (January 24, 1862)		USMA, 1837; Retired February 8, 1864
	Arnold, Richard	Captain, USA (May 14, 1861); Brigadier general, USV (November 29, 1862)	Major general, USA (March 13, 1865); Major general, USV (August 22, 1865)	USMA, 1850
	Asboth, Alexander Sandor	Brigadier general, USV (March 21, 1862)	Major general, USV (March 13, 1865)	Appointed brigadier general, USV (September 3, 1861) by John Charles Frémont who lacked the authority to make such an appointment United States Minister to Argentina and Uruguay (1866–1868)
	Augur, Christopher Columbus	Lieutenant colonel, USA (July 1, 1863); Major general, USV (August 9, 1862)	Major general, USA (March 13, 1865)	USMA, 1843
	Averell, William Woods	Captain, USA (July 17, 1862); Brigadier general, USV (September 26, 1862)	Major general, USA (March 13, 1865); Major general, USV (August 7, 1864)	USMA, 1855
	Ayres, Romeyn Beck	Captain, USA (May 14, 1861); Brigadier general, USV (November 29, 1862)	Major general, USA (March 13, 1865); Major general, USV (August 1, 1864)	USMA, 1847

=== B ===
Image	Name	Substantive Rank	Brevet Rank	Notes
	Bailey, Joseph	Brigadier general, USV (November 10, 1864)	Major general, USV (March 13, 1865)	Received the Thanks of Congress (June 4, 1864)
	Baird, Absalom	Major, USA (November 12, 1861); Brigadier general, USV (April 28, 1862)	Major general, USA (March 13, 1865); Major general, USV (September 1, 1864)	USMA, 1849; MOH, Battle of Jonesborough (September 1, 1864)
	Baker, Edward Dickinson	Brig. Gen., USV (May 17, 1861)		KIA, Battle of Ball's Bluff (October 21, 1861); Declined appointment as brigadier general, USV, nevertheless confirmed Nominated to major general, USV posthumously but not confirmed. U.S. Congressman from Illinois (1845–1846, 1849–1851); U.S. Senator from Oregon (1860–1861)
	Banks, Nathaniel Prentiss	Major general, USV (May 16, 1861)		Received the Thanks of Congress (January 28, 1864); U.S. Congressman from Massachusetts (1853–1857, 1865–1873, 1875–1879, 1889–1891); Speaker of the House (1856–1857); Governor of Massachusetts (1858–1861)
	Barlow, Francis Channing	Major general, USV (May 25, 1865)		
	Barnard, John Gross	Colonel, USA (December 28, 1865); Brigadier general, USV (September 23, 1861)	Major general, USA (March 13, 1865); Major general, USV (July 4, 1864)	USMA, 1833; Superintendent, USMA (1855–1856)
	Barnes, James	Brigadier general, USV (November 29, 1862)	Major general, USV (March 13, 1865)	
	Barnes, Joseph K., M.D.	Brigadier general, USA (August 22, 1864)	Major general, USA (March 13, 1865)	Surgeon General (1864–1882); Surgeon at the deathbeds of Presidents Abraham Lincoln and James Abram Garfield
	Barnum, Henry Alanson	Brigadier general, USV (May 31, 1865)	Major general, USV (March 13, 1865)	MOH, Battle of Lookout Mountain (November 24, 1863)
	Barry, William Farquhar	Colonel, USA (December 11, 1865); Brigadier general, USV (August 20, 1861)	Major general, USA (March 13, 1865); Major general, USV (September 1, 1864)	USMA, 1838
	Bartlett, Joseph Jackson	Brigadier general, USV (March 30, 1863)	Major general, USV (August 1, 1864)	Original appointment as brigadier general, USV (October 4, 1862) expired March 4, 1863 U.S. minister to Sweden and Norway (1867–1869)
	Bartlett, William Francis	Brigadier general, USV (June 20, 1864)	Major general, USV (March 13, 1865)	
	Baxter, Henry	Brigadier general, USV (March 12, 1863)	Major general, USV (April 1, 1865)	U.S. minister to Honduras (1869–1873)
	Bayard, George Dashiell	Captain, USA (August 20, 1861); Brigadier general, USV (April 28, 1862)		USMA, 1856; DOW, Battle of Fredericksburg (w. December 13, 1862, d. December 14, 1862)
	Beal, George Lafayette	Brigadier general, USV (November 30, 1864)	Major general, USV (March 13, 1865)	
	Beatty, John	Brigadier general, USV (November 29, 1862)		U.S. Congressman from Ohio (1868–1873)
	Beatty, Samuel	Brigadier general, USV (November 29, 1862)	Major general, USV (March 13, 1863)	
	Belknap, William Worth	Brigadier general, USV (July 30, 1864)	Major general, USV (March 13, 1865)	Secretary of War (1869–1876)
	Benham, Henry Washington	Major (August 6, 1861); Brigadier general, USV (August 13, 1861)	Major general, USA (March 13, 1865); Major general, USV (March 13, 1865)	USMA, 1837
	Benton, William Plummer	Brigadier general, USV (April 28, 1862)	Major general, USV (March 26, 1865)	
	Berry, Hiram Gregory	Major general, USV (November 29, 1862)		KIA, Battle of Chancellorsville (May 3, 1863)
	Bidwell, Daniel Davidson	Brigadier general, USV (August 11, 1864)		KIA, Battle of Cedar Creek (October 19, 1864)
	Birge, Henry Warner	Brigadier general, USV (September 19, 1863)	Major general, USV (February 25, 1865)	
	Birney, David Bell	Major general, USV (May 20, 1863)		Died of illness, October 18, 1864; Brother of William Birney
	Birney, William	Brigadier general, USV (May 22, 1863)	Major general, USV (March 13, 1865)	Brother of David Bell Birney
	Blair, Francis Preston Jr.	Major general, USV (November 29, 1862)		Declined appointment as brigadier general, USV (August 7, 1861); U.S. Congressman from Missouri (1857–1859, 1861–1862, 1863–1864); U.S. Senator from Missouri (1871–1873); Brother of Postmaster General Montgomery Blair
	Blenker, Louis (b. Blenker, Ludwig)	Brigadier general, USV (August 9, 1861)		Mustered out March 31, 1863
	Blunt, James Gillpatrick	Major general, USV (March 16, 1863)		
	Bohlen, Henry	Brigadier general, USV (April 28, 1862)		KIA in reconnaissance over the Rappahannock River, Virginia (August 22. 1862)
	Bowen, James	Brigadier general, USV (October 11, 1862)	Major general, USV (March 13, 1865)	Resigned July 27, 1864
	Boyle, Jeremiah Tilford	Brigadier general, USV (November 9, 1861)		Resigned January 26, 1864
	Bradley, Luther Prentice	Brigadier general, USV (June 30, 1864)		
	Bragg, Edward Stuyvesant	Brigadier general, USV (June 25, 1864)		U.S. Congressman from Wisconsin (1877–1883, 1885–1887); U.S. minister to Mexico
	Brannan, John Milton	Major, USA (August 1, 1863); Brigadier general, USV (September 28, 1861)	Major general, USA (March 13, 1865); Major general, USV (January 23, 1865)	USMA, 1841
	Brayman, Mason	Brigadier general, USV (September 24, 1862)	Major general, USV (March 13, 1865)	Territorial Governor of Idaho (1876–1880)
	Briggs, Henry Shaw	Brigadier general, USV (July 17, 1862)		
	Brisbin, James Sanks	Captain, USA (August 5, 1861); Brigadier general, USV (May 1, 1865)	Colonel, USA (March 13, 1865); Major general, USV (March 13, 1865)	
	Brooke, John Rutter	Brigadier general, USV (May 12, 1864)	Major general, USV (August 1, 1864)	Military Governor of Puerto Rico (1898); Military Governor of Cuba (1899); Commander-in-chief, MOLLUS (1905–1907)
	Brooks, William Thomas Harbaugh	Major, USA (March 12, 1862); Brigadier general, USV (September 28, 1861)		USMA, 1841; Appointment as major general, USV (June 10, 1863) revoked April 6, 1864; Resigned June 14, 1864
	Brown, Egbert Benson	Brigadier general, USV (November 29, 1862)		
	Buchanan, Robert Christie	Colonel, USA (February 8, 1864); Brigadier general, USV (November 29, 1862) temporary appt. expired	Major general, USA (March 13, 1865)	USMA, 1830; Temporary volunteer brig. gen. appointment expired March 4, 1863; Nephew of First Lady Louisa Adams (Wife of President John Quincy Adams)
	Buckingham, Catharinus Putnam	Brigadier general, USV (July 16, 1862)		USMA, 1829; Resigned February 11, 1863
	Buckland, Ralph Pomeroy	Brigadier general, USV (November 29, 1862)	Major general, USV (March 13, 1865)	Resigned January 6, 1865; U.S. Congressman from Ohio (1865–1869)
	Buell, Don Carlos	Colonel, USA (July 17, 1862); Major general, USV (March 21, 1862)		USMA, 1841; Mustered out of volunteer service May 28, 1864; Resigned June 1, 1864
	Buford, John	Captain, USA (November 12, 1861); Major general, USV (July 1, 1863)		USMA, 1848; Died of illness December 16, 1863; Half-brother of Napoleon Bonaparte Buford
	Buford, Napoleon Bonaparte	Brigadier general, USV (April 15, 1862)	Major general, USV (March 13, 1865)	USMA, 1827; Appointment as major general, USV (November 29, 1862) expired March 4, 1863; Half-brother of John Buford
	Burbridge, Stephen Gano	Brigadier general, USV (June 9, 1862)	Major general, USV (July 4, 1864)	
	Burnham, Hiram	Brigadier general, USV (April 26, 1864)		KIA, Battle of Chaffin's Farm (September 29, 1864)
	Burns, William Wallace	Major, USA (August 3, 1861); Brigadier general, USV (September 28, 1861)	Brigadier general, USA (March 13, 1865)	USMA, 1847; Resigned volunteer commission March 20, 1863
	Burnside, Ambrose Everett	Major general, USV (March 18, 1862)		USMA, 1847; Received the Thanks of Congress (January 28, 1864); Resigned April 15, 1865; Governor of Rhode Island (1866–1869); Commander-in-chief, GAR (1871–1873); U.S. Senator from Rhode Island (1875–1881)
	Bussey, Cyrus	Brigadier general, USV (January 5, 1864)	Major general, USV (March 13, 1865)	
	Busteed, Richard	Brigadier general, USV (August 7, 1862)		Appointment expired March 4, 1863
	Butler, Benjamin Franklin	Major general, USV (May 16, 1863)		U.S. Congressman from Massachusetts (1867–1875, 1877–1879); Governor of Massachusetts (1883–1884); Father-in-law of Adelbert Ames
	Butterfield, Daniel	Colonel, USA (July 1, 1863); Major general, USV (November 29, 1862)	Major general, USA (March 13, 1865)	MOH, Battle of Gaines' Mill (June 27, 1862)

=== C ===
Image	Name	Substantive Rank	Brevet Rank	Notes
	Cadwalader, George	Major general, USV (April 25, 1862)		Resigned July 6, 1865; First commander-in-chief of MOLLUS (1865–1879)
	Caldwell, John Curtis	Brigadier general, USV (April 28, 1862)	Major general, USV (August 19, 1865)	U.S. minister to Uruguay and Paraguay (1874–1882)
	Cameron, Robert Alexander	Brigadier general, USV (August 11, 1863)	Major general, USV (March 13, 1865)	
	Campbell, Charles Thomas	Brigadier general, USV (March 13, 1863)		Original appointment as brigadier general, USV (November 29, 1862) expired March 4, 1863
	Campbell, William Bowen	Brigadier general, USV (June 30, 1862)		Resigned January 26, 1863; U.S. Congressman from Tennessee (1847–1853); Governor of Tennessee (1851–1853)
	Canby, Edward Richard Sprigg	Colonel, USA (May 14, 1861); Major general, USV (May 7, 1864)	Major general, USA (March 13, 1865)	USMA, 1839; Brother-in-law of John Parker Hawkins
	Carleton, James Henry	Major, USA; Brigadier general, USV (April 28, 1862)	Major general, USA (March 13, 1865); Major general, USV (March 13, 1865)	
	Carlin, William Passmore	Major, USA (February 8, 1864); Brigadier general, USV (November 29, 1862)	Major general, USA (March 13, 1865); Major general, USV (March 19, 1865)	USMA, 1850
	Carr, Eugene Asa	Major, USA (July 17, 1862); Brigadier general, USV (March 7, 1862)	Major general, USA (March 13, 1865); Major general, USV (March 11, 1865)	USMA, 1850; MOH, Battle of Pea Ridge (March 7, 1862)
	Carr, Joseph Bradford	Brigadier general, USV (March 30, 1863)	Major general, USV (March 13, 1865)	Original appointment as brigadier general, USV (September 7, 1862) expired March 4, 1863; second appointment (March 30, 1863) expired March 30, 1864; finally confirmed June 30, 1864
	Carrington, Henry Beebee	Colonel, USA (May 14, 1861); Brigadier general, USV (November 29, 1862)		
	Carroll, Samuel Sprigg	Captain, USA (November 1, 1861); Brigadier general, USV (May 12, 1864)	Major general, USA (March 13, 1865); Major general, USV (March 13, 1865)	USMA, 1856
	Carter, Samuel Powhatan	Commander, USN (June 25, 1865); Brigadier general, USV (May 1, 1862)	Major general, USV (March 13, 1865)	U.S. Naval Academy, 1846; Only officer ever to hold flag rank in both the U.S. Army and U.S. Navy (appointed Rear Admiral May 16, 1882)
	Casey, Silas	Colonel, USA (October 9, 1861); Major general, USV (May 31, 1862)	Major general, USA (March 13, 1865)	USMA, 1826
	Catterson, Robert Francis, M.D.	Brigadier general, USV (May 31, 1865)		
	Chamberlain, Joshua Lawrence (b. Lawrence Joshua Chamberlain)	Brigadier general, USV (June 19, 1864)	Major general, USV (March 29, 1865)	MOH, Battle of Gettysburg (July 2, 1863); Detailed to receive surrender of the Army of Northern Virginia (April 12, 1865); Governor of Maine (1866–1870); One of only two general officers ever promoted on the field by General Grant
	Chambers, Alexander	Captain, USA (May 14, 1861); Brigadier general, USV (August 11, 1863)	Brigadier general, USA (March 13, 1865)	USMA, 1853; Volunteer appointment cancelled by the Senate April 6, 1864, ostensibly because Chambers was not a legal resident of Iowa
	Champlin, Stephen Gardner	Brigadier general, USV (November 29, 1862)		Resigned November 8, 1863; DOW, Battle of Seven Pines (w. May 31, 1862, d. January 24, 1864)
	Chapman, George Henry	Brigadier general, USV (July 21, 1864)	Major general, USV (March 13, 1865)	
	Chetlain, Augustus Louis	Brigadier general, USV (December 18, 1863)	Major general, USV (June 18, 1865)	
	Chrysler, Morgan Henry	Brigadier general, USV (November 11, 1865)	Major general, USV (March 13, 1865)	
	Clark, William Thomas	Brigadier general, USV (May 31, 1865)	Major general, USV (November 24, 1865)	U.S. Congressman from Texas (1869–1872)
	Clay, Cassius Marcellus	Major general, USV (April 11, 1862) Eicher: inactive?		Rejected appointment and resigned, March 11, 1863; U.S. minister to Russia (1863–1869)
	Clayton, Powell	Brigadier general, USV (August 1, 1864)		Confirmed February 1865, ordered returned to Senate February 28, 1865 returned March 2, 1865, no reconfirmation Governor of Arkansas (1868–1871); U.S. Senator from Arkansas (1871–1877); U.S. minister to Mexico (1897–1898); U.S. Ambassador to Mexico (1898–1905)
	Cluseret, Gustave Paul	Brigadier general, USV (October 14, 1862)		Arrested on unspecified charges, January, 1863; Resigned March 2, 1863; Volunteer appointment never confirmed
	Cochrane, John	Brigadier general, USV (July 17, 1862)		Resigned February 25, 1862; U.S. Congressman from New York (1857–1861)
	Connor, Patrick Edward	Brigadier general, USV (March 30, 1863)	Major general, USV (March 13, 1865)	
	Connor, Seldon	Brigadier general, USV (June 11, 1864)		Governor of Maine (1876–1879)
	Cook, John Pope	Brigadier general, USV (March 21, 1862)	Major general, USV (August 24, 1865)	
	Cooke, Philip St. George	Brigadier general, USA (November 12, 1861)	Major general, USA (March 13, 1865)	USMA, 1827; Father of General John Rogers Cooke, CSA; Father-in-law of General James Ewell Brown Stuart, CSA
	Cooper, James	Brigadier general, USV (May 17, 1861)		Died March 28, 1863; U.S. Congressman from Pennsylvania (1849–1843); U.S. Senator from Pennsylvania (1849–1855)
	Cooper, Joseph Alexander	Brigadier general, USV (July 30, 1864)	Major general, USV (March 13, 1865)	
	Copeland, Joseph Tarr	Brigadier general, USV (November 29, 1862)		Resigned November 8, 1865
	Corcoran, Michael	Brigadier general, USV (July 21, 1861)		Died in riding accident December 22, 1863
	Corse, John Murray	Brigadier general, USV (August 11, 1863)	Major general, USV (October 5, 1864)	USMA (class of 1857), withdrew 1855
	Couch, Darius Nash	Major general, USV (July 4, 1862)		USMA, 1846; Resigned May 26, 1865
	Cowdin, Robert	Brigadier general, USV (September 26, 1862)		Appointment expired March 4, 1863; Relieved and mustered out March 30, 1863
	Cox, Jacob Dolson	Major General (December 7, 1864)		Original appointment as major general, USV (October 6, 1862) expired March 4, 1863; Resigned June 27, 1864; Governor of Ohio (1866–1867); United States Secretary of the Interior (1869–1870); U.S. Congressman from Ohio (1877–1879)
	Craig, James	Brigadier general, USV (March 21, 1862)		Resigned May 5, 1863; U.S. Congressman from Missouri (1857–1861)
	Crawford, Samuel Wylie, M.D.	Lieutenant colonel, USA (February 17, 1864); Brigadier general, USV (April 25, 1862)	Major general, USA (March 13, 1865); Major general, USV (August 1, 1864)	
	Crittenden, Thomas Leonidas	Major general, USV (July 17, 1862)		Resigned December 13, 1864; Son of Senator John Jordan Crittenden; Brother of General George Bibb Crittenden, CSA; Cousin of Thomas Turpin Crittenden
	Crittenden, Thomas Turpin	Brigadier general, USV (April 28, 1862)		Resigned May 5, 1863; Nephew of Senator John Jordan Crittenden; Cousin of Thomas Leonidas Crittenden and General George Bibb Crittenden, CSA
	Crocker, Marcellus Monroe	Brigadier general, USV (November 29, 1862)		USMA (class of 1851), withdrew 1849; Died of illness August 26, 1865
	Crook, George	Captain, USA (May 14, 1861); Major general, USV (October 21, 1864)	Major general, USA (March 13, 1865)	USMA, 1852
	Croxton, John Thomas	Brigadier general, USV (July 30, 1864)	Major general, USV (April 27, 1865)	U.S. minister to Bolivia (1873–1874)
	Cruft, Charles	Brigadier general, USV (July 16, 1862)	Major general, USV (March 5, 1865)	
	Cullum, George Washington	Lieutenant colonel, USA (March 3, 1863); Brigadier general, USV (November 1, 1861)	Major general, USA (March 13, 1865)	USMA, 1833; Superintendent, USMA (1864–1866); Created the Cullum number system to identify USMA graduates Brother-in-law to Schuyler Hamilton (married widow of Henry Wager Halleck)
	Curtis, Newton Martin	Brigadier general, USV (January 15, 1865)	Major general, USV (March 13, 1865)	MOH, First Battle of Fort Fisher (January 15, 1865); U.S. Congressman from New York (1891–1897)
	Curtis, Samuel Ryan	Major general, USV (March 21, 1862)		USMA, 1831; U.S. Congressman from Iowa (1857–1861)
	Custer, George Armstrong	Captain, USA (June 5, 1862); Major general, USV (April 15, 1865)	Major general, USA (March 13, 1865)	USMA, 1861
	Cutler, Lysander	Brigadier general, USV (November 29, 1862)	Major general, USV (August 19, 1864)	Resigned June 30, 1865

=== D ===
Image	Name	Substantive Rank	Brevet Rank	Notes
	Daggett, Aaron Simon	Lieutenant colonel, USV (January 23, 1865)	Brigadier general, USV (March 13, 1865)	Last surviving brevet general (d. May 14, 1938)
	Dana, Napoleon Jackson Tecumseh	Major general, USV (November 29, 1862)		USMA, 1842; Resigned May 27, 1865
	Davidson, John Wynn	Major, USA (November 14, 1861); Brigadier general, USV (February 3, 1862)	Major general, USA (March 13, 1865); Major general, USV (March 13, 1865)	USMA, 1845
	Davies, Henry Eugene	Major general, USV (May 4, 1865)		Nephew of Thomas Alfred Davies
	Davies, Thomas Alfred	Brigadier general, USV (March 7, 1862)	Major general, USV (July 11, 1865)	USMA, 1829; Uncle of Henry Eugene Davies
	Davis, Edmund Jackson	Brigadier general, USV (November 10, 1864)		Governor of Texas (1870–1874)
	Davis, Jefferson Columbus	Captain, USA (May 14, 1861); Brigadier general, USV (December 18, 1861)	Major general, USA (March 13, 1865); Major general, USV (August 8, 1864)	Shot and killed Major General William Nelson in a private altercation (September 29, 1862)
	Dawes, Rufus Robinson	Colonel, USV (July 5, 1864)	Brigadier general, USV (March 13, 1865)	Resigned August 10, 1864; U.S. Congressman from Ohio (1881–1883); Father of Vice President Charles Gates Dawes
	Deitzler, George Washington	Brigadier general, USV (November 29, 1862)		Resigned August 27, 1863; Major General of Kansas Militia, 1864
	Delafield, Richard	Brigadier general, USA (April 22, 1864)	Major general, USA (March 13, 1865)	USMA, 1818; Superintendent, USMA (1838–1845, 1856–1861, 1861); Chief of Engineers (1864–1866)
	Dennis, Elias Smith	Brigadier general, USV (November 29, 1862)	Major general, USV (March 13, 1865)	
	Dent, Frederick Tracy	Lieutenant colonel, USA (March 20, 1864); Brigadier general, USV (April 5, 1865)	Brigadier general, USA (March 13, 1865)	USMA, 1843; Brother-in-law of Ulysses S. Grant
	Denver, James W.	Brigadier general, USV (August 14, 1861)		Resigned March 5, 1863; U.S. Congressman from California (1855–1857); Territorial Governor of Kansas (1857–1858); Namesake of Denver, Colorado
	De Russy, Gustavus Adolphus	Captain, USA (August 17, 1857); Brigadier general, USV (May 23, 1863)	Brigadier general, USA (March 13, 1865)	USMA (class of 1839), resigned in 1838; Son of René Edward De Russy; Brother-in-law of Henry Jackson Hunt and Lewis Cass Hunt
	De Russy, René Edward	Colonel, USA (March 3, 1863)	Brigadier general, USA (March 13, 1865)	USMA, 1812; Superintendent, USMA (1833–1838); Father of Gustavus Adolphus De Russy; Father-in-law of Henry Jackson Hunt and Lewis Cass Hunt
	De Trobriand, Philippe Régis Dénis de Keredern	Brigadier general, USV (January 5, 1864)	Major general, USV (April 9, 1865)	
	Devens, Charles Jr.	Brigadier general, USV (April 15, 1862)	Major general, USV (April 3, 1865)	Commander-in-chief, GAR (1873–1875); Attorney General of the United States (1877–1881)
	Devin, Thomas Casimer	Brigadier general, USV (October 19, 1864)	Major general, USV (March 13, 1865)	
	Deweese, John Thomas	Lieutenant colonel, USV	Brigadier general, USV (March 13, 1865)	U.S. Congressman from North Carolina (1868–1870)
	Dewey, Joel Allen	Brigadier general, USV (November 20, 1865)		Last Civil War general appointed
	Diven, Alexander Samuel	Colonel, USV (October 21, 1862)	Brigadier general, USV (August 30, 1864)	Resigned May 11, 1863; U.S. Congressman from New York (1861–1863)
	Dix, John Adams	Major general, USV (May 16, 1861)		Resigned November 30, 1865; U.S. Senator from New York (1845–1849); Secretary of the Treasury (1861); U.S. minister to France (1866–1869); Governor of New York (1873–1874); Highest-ranking volunteer officer
	Dodge, Charles Cleveland	Brigadier general, USV (November 29, 1862)		Resigned June 12, 1863
	Dodge, Grenville Mellen	Major general, USV (June 7, 1864)		U.S. Congressman from Iowa (1867–1869); Commander-in-chief, MOLLUS (1907–1909)
	Doolittle, Charles Camp	Brigadier general, USV (January 27, 1865)	Major general, USV (March 13, 1865)	
	Doubleday, Abner	Lieutenant colonel, USA (September 20, 1863); Major general, USV (November 29, 1862)	Major general, USA (March 13, 1865)	USMA, 1842; Aimed first cannon to return fire from Fort Sumter
	Dow, Neal	Brigadier general, USV (April 28, 1862)		Resigned November 30, 1864
	Drake, Francis Marion	Lieutenant colonel, USV (October 4, 1862)	Brigadier general, USV (February 22, 1865)	Governor of Iowa (1896–1898)
	Draper, William Francis	Lieutenant colonel, USV (August 9, 1864)	Brigadier general, USV (March 13, 1865)	U.S. Congressman from Massachusetts (1893–1897); U.S. Ambassador to Italy (1897–1900)
	Duffié, Alfred Napoleon Alexander (aka. Duffie, Alfred Nattie)	Brigadier general, USV (June 23, 1863)		
	Dumont, Ebenezer	Brigadier general, USV (September 3, 1861)		Resigned February 28, 1863; U.S. Congressman from Indiana (1863–1867)
	Dunn, William McKee	Lieutenant colonel, USA (June 22, 1864)	Brigadier general, USA (March 13, 1865)	U.S. Congressman from Indiana (1859–1863)
	Duryée, Abram	Brigadier general, USV (August 31, 1861)	Major general, USV (March 13, 1865)	Resigned January 5, 1863
	Dutton, Arthur Henry	Captain, USA (October 2, 1863); Colonel, USV (September 5, 1862)	Colonel, USA (May 26, 1864); Brigadier general, USV (May 16, 1864)	USMA, 1861; DOW, Battle of Proctor's Creek (w. May 16, 1864, d. June 5, 1864)
	Duval, Isaac Hardin	Brigadier general, USV (September 24, 1864)	Major general, USV (March 13, 1865)	U.S. Congressman from West Virginia (1869–1871)
	Dwight, William	Brigadier general, USV (November 29, 1862)		USMA (class of 1853), discharged January 31, 1853
	Dyer, Alexander Brydie	Brigadier general, USA (September 12, 1864)	Major general, USA (March 13, 1865)	USMA, 1837; Chief of Ordnance (1864–1874)

=== E ===
Image	Name	Substantive Rank	Brevet Rank	Notes
	Eaton, Amos Beebe	Brigadier general, USA (June 29, 1864)	Major general, USA (March 13, 1865)	USMA, 1826; Commissary General of Subsistence (1864–1874)
	Edgerton, Alonzo Jay	Colonel, USV (February 15, 1864)	Brigadier general, USV (March 13, 1865)	U.S. Senator from Minnesota (1881)
	Edwards, John	Brigadier General (September 24, 1864)		U.S. Congressman from Arkansas (1871 – February 8, 1872); Removed from seat when election was successfully contested
	Edwards, Oliver	Brigadier general, USV (May 19, 1865)	Major general, USV (April 5, 1865)	
	Egan, Thomas Washington	Brigadier general, USV (September 3, 1864)	Major general, USV (October 27, 1864)	
	Ekin, James A.	Lieutenant colonel, USA (July 29, 1865); Colonel, USV (August 2, 1864)	Brigadier general, USA (March 13, 1865); Brigadier general, USV (March 8, 1865)	Commissioner on Lincoln assassination trial
	Ellet, Alfred Washington	Brigadier general, USV (November 1, 1862)		Resigned, December 31, 1864; Brother of Charles Ellet, Jr. Uncle of Charles Rivers Ellet
	Elliott, Washington Lafayette	Major, USA (November 5, 1861); Brigadier general, USV (June 11, 1862)	Major general, USA (March 13, 1865); Major general, USV (March 13, 1865)	USMA (class of 1845), left in 1844
	Emory, William Helmsley	Colonel, USA (October 27, 1863); Major general, USV (September 25, 1865)	Major general, USA (March 13, 1865)	USMA, 1831; Namesake of Emory Peak
	Estey, George Peabody (aka. George Peabody Este)	Brigadier general, USV (June 26, 1865)		
	Eustis, Henry Lawrence	Brigadier General (September 12, 1863)		USMA, 1842; Resigned, June 27, 1864
	Ewing, Charles	Captain, USA (May 14, 1861); Brigadier general, USV (March 8, 1865)	Colonel, USA (March 13, 1865)	Son of Thomas Ewing; Brother of Thomas Ewing, Jr. Brother of Hugh Boyle Ewing; Brother-in-law of William Tecumseh Sherman
	Ewing, Hugh Boyle	Brigadier general, USV (November 29, 1862)	Major general, USV (March 13, 1865)	USMA, class of 1848, never graduated U.S. minister to the Netherlands (1866–1870); Son of Thomas Ewing; Brother of Thomas Ewing, Jr. Brother of Charles Ewing; Brother-in-law of William Tecumseh Sherman
	Ewing, Thomas Jr.	Brigadier general, USV (March 13, 1863)	Major general, USV (March 13, 1865)	Resigned February 23, 1865; U.S. Congressman from Ohio (1877–1881); Son of Thomas Ewing; Brother of Charles Ewing; Brother of Hugh Boyle Ewing; Brother-in-law of William Tecumseh Sherman

=== F ===
Image	Name	Substantive Rank	Brevet Rank	Notes
	Fairchild, Lucius	Captain, USA (August, 1861); Brigadier general, USV (October 13, 1863)		Resigned November, 1863; Governor of Wisconsin (1866–1872); U.S. minister to Spain (1880–1881); Commander-in-chief, GAR (1886–1887); Commander-in-chief, MOLLUS (1893–1895)
	Farnsworth, Elon John	Captain, USV (December 25, 1861)		Nominated brigadier general, USV, June 29, 1863, but not confirmed by U.S. Senate; Assigned to command 1st Brigade, 3rd Division, Cavalry Corps, Army of the Potomac, June 28, 1863, KIA, Battle of Gettysburg (July 3, 1863)
	Ferrero, Edward	Brigadier general, USV (May 6, 1863)	Major general, USV (December, 1864)	Original appointment as brigadier general, USV (September 10, 1862) expired March 4, 1863
	Ferry, Orris S.	Brigadier general, USV (March 17, 1862)	Major general, USV (May 23, 1865)	U.S. Congressman from Connecticut (1859–1861); U.S. Senator from Connecticut (1867–1875)
	Fessenden, Francis	Captain, USA; Major general, USV (November 9, 1865)		Son of Secretary of the Treasury William Pitt Fessenden; Brother of James Deering Fessenden
	Fessenden, James Deering	Brigadier general, USV (August 8, 1864)	Major general, USV (March 13, 1865)	Son of Secretary of the Treasury William Pitt Fessenden; Brother of Francis Fessenden
	Fisk, Clinton Bowen	Brigadier general, USV (November 24, 1862)	Major general, USV (March 13, 1865)	
	Force, Manning Ferguson	Brigadier general, USV (August 11, 1863)	Major general, USV	MOH, Battle of Atlanta (July 22, 1864); Brother-in-law of John Pope
	Forsyth, James W.	Captain, USA (October 24, 1861); Brigadier general, USV (March 19, 1865)	Brigadier general, USA (March 13, 1865)	USMA, 1856
	Foster, John Gray	Captain, USA; Major general, USV (July 18, 1862)	Major general, USA (March 13, 1865)	USMA, 1846
	Foster, Robert Sanford	Brigadier general, USV (June 12, 1863)	Major general, USV	Commissioner on Lincoln assassination trial
	Franklin, William Buel	Colonel, USA (May 14, 1861); Major general, USV (July 4, 1862)		USMA, 1843
	Frémont, John Charles	Major general, USA (May 14, 1861)		Resigned June 4, 1864; U.S. Senator from California (1850–1851); Territorial Governor of Arizona (1878–1887); Son-in-law of Senator Thomas Hart Benton
	French, William H.	Colonel, USA; Major general, USV (November 29, 1862)		USMA, 1837; Mustered out of volunteer service May 6, 1864
	Fry, James Barnet	Brigadier general, USA (April 21, 1864)	Major general, USA	USMA, 1847; Provost Marshal General (1863–1866)
	Fry, Speed Smith	Brigadier general, USV (March 21, 1862)		
	Fuller, John Wallace	Brigadier general, USV (January 5, 1864)	Major general, USV (March 13, 1865)	

=== G ===
Image	Name	Substantive Rank	Brevet Rank	Notes
	Gamble, William	Brigadier general, USV (September 25, 1865)		
	Garfield, James Abram	Major general, USV (September 19, 1863)		Resigned December 5, 1863; U.S. Congressman from Ohio (1863–1881); 20th President of the United States (1881); Second President to die by assassination
	Garrard, Kenner	First Lieutenant, USA; Brigadier general, USV (July 23, 1863)	Major general, USA (March 13, 1863); Major general, USV (December 16, 1864)	USMA, 1851; First cousin (once removed) of Theophilus Toulmin Garrard
	Garrard, Theophilus Toulmin	Brigadier general, USV (November 29, 1862)		Mustered out April 4, 1864; First cousin (once removed) of Kenner Garrard
	Geary, John White	Brigadier general, USV (April 25, 1862)	Major general, USV (January 12, 1865)	Territorial Governor of Kansas (1856–1857); Governor of Pennsylvania (1867–1873)
	Getty, George Washington	Captain, USA; Brigadier general, USV (September 25, 1862)	Major general, USA (March 13, 1865); Major general, USV (August, 1864)	USMA, 1840
	Gibbon, John	Captain, USA; Major general, USV (June 7, 1864)	Major general, USA (March 13, 1865)	USMA, 1847; Commander-in-chief, MOLLUS (1895–1896)
	Gibbs, Alfred	Captain, USA; Brigadier general, USV (October 19, 1864)	Major general, USA; Major general, USV	USMA, 1846
	Gilbert, Charles Champion	Major, USA (July, 1863); Brigadier general, USV (September 4, 1862)	Colonel, USA	USMA, 1846; Appointment expired, March 4, 1863; Assigned to duty as "acting" Major General (August, 1862) by Horatio Gouverneur Wright
	Gilbert, James Isham	Brigadier general, USV (February 9, 1865)	Major general, USV	
	Gillem, Alvan Cullem	Captain, USA (July 12, 1861); Major general, USV (November 3, 1865)	Major general, USA (April 12, 1865)	USMA, 1851
	Gillmore, Quincy Adams	Major, USA (June 1, 1863); Major general, USV (July 10, 1863)	Brigadier general, USA (March 13, 1865)	USMA, 1851
	Gordon, George Henry	Brigadier general, USV (June 9, 1862)	Major general, USV (March 13, 1865)	USMA, 1846
	Gorman, Willis A.	Brigadier general, USV (September 7, 1861)		Mustered out May 4, 1864; Territorial Governor of Minnesota (1853–1857)
	Graham, Charles Kinnaird	Brigadier general, USV (November 29, 1862)	Major general, USV (March 13, 1865)	
	Graham, Lawrence Pike	Colonel, USA (1864); Brigadier general, USV (August, 1861)	Brigadier general, USA (March 13, 1865)	
	Granger, Gordon	Major general, USV (September 17, 1862)	Major general, USA (March 13, 1865)	USMA, 1845
	Granger, Robert Seaman	Major, USA (September, 1861); Brigadier general, USV (October, 1862)	Major general, USA	USMA, 1838
	Grant, Lewis Addison	Brigadier general, USV (April 27, 1864)		MOH, Battle of Salem Church (May 3, 1863)
	Grant, Ulysses S. (b. Grant, Hiram Ulysses)	Lieutenant General, USA (March 4, 1864)		USMA, 1843; Received the Thanks of Congress (December 17, 1863); Received the Congressional Gold Medal (December 17, 1863); First full-grade Lieutenant General since George Washington; First General since George Washington (July 25, 1866); General-in-Chief (1864–1869); 18th President of the United States (1869–1877)
	Greene, George Sears	Brigadier general, USV (April 28, 1862)		USMA, 1823
	Gregg, David McMurtrie	Captain, USA (1861); Brigadier general, USV (November 29, 1862)		USMA, 1855; Resigned February 3, 1865; Commander-in-chief, MOLLUS (1903–1905); Cousin of Pennsylvania Governor Andrew Gregg Curtin
	Gresham, Walter Quintin	Brigadier general, USV (August 11, 1883)	Major general, USV (March 13, 1865)	Resigned due to wounds, 1863; Postmaster General (1883–1884); Secretary of the Treasury (1884); Secretary of State (1893–1895)
	Grierson, Benjamin Henry	Major general, USV (May 27, 1865)		
	Griffin, Charles	Captain, USA; Major general, USV (April 2, 1865)	Major general, USA (March 13, 1865)	USMA, 1847; Brother-in-law of Samuel Sprigg Carroll
	Griffin, Simon Goodell	Brigadier general, USV (May 12, 1864)	Major general, USV (April 2, 1865)	
	Grose, William	Brigadier general, USV (July 30, 1864)	Major general, USV (August 13, 1865)	
	Grover, Cuvier	Captain, USA; Brigadier general, USV (April 14, 1862)	Major general, USA; Major general, USV	USMA, 1850

=== H ===
Image	Name	Substantive Rank	Brevet Rank	Notes
	Hackleman, Pleasant Adams	Brigadier general, USV (April 20, 1862)		KIA, Battle of Corinth (October 3, 1862)
	Halleck, Henry Wager	Major general, USA (August 19, 1861)		USMA, 1839; General-in-Chief, U.S. Army (July 23, 1862 – March 12, 1864); Chief of staff, U.S. Army (March 12, 1864-May, 1865)
	Hamblin, Joseph Eldridge	Brigadier general, USV (May 19, 1865)	Major general, USV (March 13, 1865)	
	Hamilton, Andrew J.	Brigadier general, USV (September 18, 1863)		First appointment as brigadier general (November 14, 1862) never confirmed Reconstruction Governor of Texas (June, 1865-August, 1866)
	Hamilton, Charles Smith	Major general, USV (September 19, 1862)		USMA, 1843; Resigned, April 13, 1863
	Hamilton, Schuyler	Colonel, USA; Brigadier general, USV (November 12, 1861)		USMA, 1841; Grandson of Alexander Hamilton; Brother-in-law of Henry W. Halleck; later brother-in-law to George Washington Cullum; Nominated major general, USV (September 17, 1862), never confirmed due to illness Resigned February 27, 1863
	Hamlin, Cyrus	Colonel, USA (February 12, 1863); Brigadier general, USV (December 13, 1864)	Major general, USV (March 13, 1865)	Son of Vice President Hannibal Hamlin; Brother of Charles Hamlin
	Hammond, William Alexander	Brigadier general, USA (April 25, 1862)		Surgeon General (1862–1864); Dismissed from service, August 18, 1864
	Hancock, Winfield Scott	Brigadier general, USA (August 12, 1864); Major general, USV (November 29, 1862)		USMA, 1844; Received the Thanks of Congress (April 21, 1866); Commander-in-chief, MOLLUS (1879–1886)
	Hardin, Martin Davis	Major, USA; Brigadier general, USV (July 2, 1864)	Brigadier general, USA	USMA, 1859
	Harding, Abner Clark	Brigadier general, USV (March 13, 1863)		Resigned June, 1863; U.S. Congressman from Illinois (1865–1869)
	Harker, Charles Garrison	Brigadier general, USV (April 10, 1864)		USMA, 1858; KIA, Battle of Kennesaw Mountain (June 26, 1864)
	Harland, Edward	Brigadier general, USV (November 29, 1862)		
	Harney, William Selby	Brigadier general, USA (June 14, 1858)	Major general, USA (March 13, 1865)	
	Harris, Thomas Maley	Brigadier general, USV (March 29, 1865)		Commissioner on Lincoln assassination trial
	Harrison, Benjamin	Colonel, USV	Brigadier general, USV (January 23, 1865)	U.S. Senator from Indiana (1881–1887); 23rd President of the United States (1889–1893)
	Harrow, William	Brigadier general, USV (November 29, 1862)		Relieved, September 1864; Resigned, April 7, 1865
	Hartranft, John F.	Brigadier general, USV (May 12, 1864)	Major general, USV (March 28, 1865)	MOH, First Battle of Bull Run; Provost Marshal, Lincoln Assassination trial Commander-in-chief, GAR (1875–1877); Governor of Pennsylvania (1873–1879)
	Hartsuff, George Lucas	Lieutenant colonel, USA; Major general, USV (November 19, 1862)	Major general, USA	USMA, 1852
	Hascall, Milo Smith	Brigadier general, USV (April 25, 1862)		USMA, 1852; Recommended for promotion to major general, USV, September 12, 1864; no action taken Resigned, October 27, 1864
	Haskin, Joseph Abel	Lieutenant colonel, USA; Brigadier general, USV (August 5, 1864)	Brigadier general, USA (March 13, 1865)	USMA, 1839
	Hatch, Edward	Brigadier general, USV (April 27, 1864)	Major general, USV	
	Hatch, John Porter	Major, USA (1863); Brigadier general, USV (September 28, 1861)	Brigadier general, USA; Major general, USV	USMA, 1845; MOH, Battle of South Mountain
	Haupt, Herman	Colonel, USA (April 27, 1862); Brigadier general, USV (September 5, 1862)		USMA, 1835; Refused commission as brigadier general, resigned September 14, 1863
	Hawkins, John Parker	Captain, USA; Brigadier general, USV (April 13, 1863)	Major general, USA (March 13, 1865); Major general, USV (March 13, 1865)	USMA, 1852; Brother-in-law of E.R.S. Canby
	Hawley, Joseph Roswell	Brigadier general, USV (September 13, 1864)	Major general, USV (March 13, 1865)	Governor of Connecticut (1866–1867); U.S. Congressman from Connecticut (1872–1875, 1879–1881); U.S. Senator from Connecticut (1881–1905)
	Hayes, Joseph	Brigadier general, USV (May 12, 1864)	Major general, USV (March 13, 1865)	
	Hayes, Rutherford Birchard	Brigadier general, USV (October 19, 1864)	Major general, USV (March 13, 1865)	Resigned commission, June, 1865; U.S. Congressman from Ohio (1865–1867); Governor of Ohio (1868–1872, 1876–1877); 19th President of the United States (1877–1881); Commander-in-chief, MOLLUS (1886, 1888–1893)
	Haynie, Isham N.	Brigadier general, USV (November 29, 1862)		Commission never confirmed by Senate, expired March 4, 1863; Resigned, March 6, 1863; Warner lists as brig. gen., Eicher does not
	Hays, Alexander	Captain, USA; Brigadier general, USV (September 29, 1862)	Colonel, USA; Major general, USV (May 5, 1864)	USMA, 1844; KIA, Battle of the Wilderness (May 5, 1864)
	Hays, William	Major, USA (1863); Brigadier general, USV (December 27, 1862)		USMA, 1840; Relieved of duty, April 6, 1865
	Hazen, William Babcock	Colonel, USA; Major general, USV (December 13, 1864)	Major general, USA	USMA, 1856
	Heckman, Charles Adam	Brigadier general, USV (November 29, 1862)		Relieved, March 23, 1865; Resigned, May 25, 1865
	Heintzelman, Samuel P.	Colonel, USA (May 14, 1861); Major general, USV (May 5, 1862)		USMA, 1826
	Herron, Francis Jay	Major general, USV (November 29, 1862)		Youngest Major General; MOH, Battle of Pea Ridge
	Hinks, Edward Winslow (b. Hincks, Edward Winslow; aka Hinks, Edward Ward)	Second Lieutenant, USA (April 26, 1861); Brigadier general, USV (November 29, 1862)	Brigadier general, USA (March 2, 1867); Major general, USV (March 13, 1865)	Resigned regular Army commission June 4, 1861, returned to regular service after the war
	Hitchcock, Ethan Allen	Colonel, USA; Major general, USV (February 10, 1862)	Brigadier general, USV (1848)	USMA, 1817; Grandson of Ethan Allen
	Hobson, Edward H.	Brigadier general, USV (November 29, 1862)		
	Holt, Joseph	Brigadier general, USA (June 22, 1864)		Postmaster General (1859–1860); Secretary of War (1861–1862); Judge Advocate General; Presiding judge on the Lincoln assassination trial
	Hooker, Joseph	Brigadier general, USA (September 20, 1862); Major general, USV (May 5, 1862)		USMA, 1837; Received Thanks of Congress (January 28, 1864)
	Hovey, Alvin P.	Brigadier general, USV (April 28, 1862)	Major general, USV (June 4, 1864)	U.S. minister to Peru (1866–1870); U.S. Congressman (1887–1889); Governor of Indiana (1889–1891)
	Hovey, Charles Edward	Brigadier general, USV (September 5, 1862)	Major general, USV (March 13, 1865)	Commission never confirmed, expired March 4, 1863; Resigned due to wounds, May, 1863
	Howard, Oliver Otis	Brigadier general, USA (December 21, 1864); Major general, USV (November 29, 1862)		USMA, 1854; MOH, Battle of Fair Oaks; Received Thanks of Congress (January 28, 1864); Commissioner of the Freedmen's Bureau (1865–1871); Superintendent, USMA (1881–1882); Last surviving Civil War army commander and substantive Regular Army general.
	Howe, Albion Parris	Captain, USA (1855); Brigadier general, USV (June 22, 1862)	Major general, USA (March 13, 1865); Major general, USV (March 13, 1865)	USMA, 1841; Commissioner on Lincoln assassination trial
	Howell, Joshua B.	Brigadier general, USV (September 12, 1864)		Posthumous promotion Died in riding accident, September 12, 1864
	Humphreys, Andrew Atkinson	Colonel, USA; Major general, USV (July 8, 1863)	Major general, USA	USMA, 1831
	Hunt, Henry Jackson	Lieutenant colonel, USA; Brigadier general, USV (September 15, 1862)	Major general, USA (March 13, 1865); Major general, USV (1863)	USMA, 1839; Brother of Lewis Cass Hunt; Son-in-law of René Edward De Russy; Brother-in-law of John Parker Hawkins and Gustavus Adolphus De Russy
	Hunt, Lewis Cass	Major, USA (1863); Brigadier general, USV (November 29, 1862)	Brigadier general, USA (1865)	USMA, 1847; Brother of Henry Jackson Hunt; Son-in-law of René Edward De Russy; Brother-in-law of John Parker Hawkins and Gustavus Adolphus De Russy
	Hunter, David	Colonel, USA; Major general, USV (August 13, 1861)	Major general, USA	USMA, 1822; Presiding Commissioner on Lincoln assassination trial
	Hurlbut, Stephen A.	Major general, USV (September 17, 1862)		Mustered out of service for alleged corruption, June 20, 1865; First commander-in-chief, GAR (1866–1868); U.S. minister to Colombia (1869–1872); U.S. Congressman from Illinois (1873–1877); U.S. minister to Peru (1881–1882)

=== I ===
Image	Name	Substantive Rank	Brevet Rank	Notes
	Ingalls, Rufus	Major, USA (1862); Brigadier general, USV (May 23, 1863)	Major general, USA; Major general, USV	USMA, 1843; 16th Quartermaster General of the U.S. Army 1882-1883

=== J ===
Image	Name	Substantive Rank	Brevet Rank	Notes
	Jackson, Conrad Feger	Brigadier general, USV (July 17, 1862)		KIA, Battle of Fredericksburg (December 13, 1862)
	Jackson, James Streshly	Brigadier general, USV (July 19, 1862)		U.S. Congressman from Kentucky (1861); KIA, Battle of Perryville (October 8, 1862)
	Jackson, Nathaniel James	Brigadier general, USV (September 24, 1862)	Major general, USV	
	Jackson, Richard Henry	Captain, USA (1862); Brigadier general, USV (May 19, 1865)	Brigadier general, USA; Major general, USV	Postwar appointment but listed by Eicher and Warner
	Jameson, Charles Davis	Brigadier general, USV (September 3, 1861)		d. November 6, 1862 of illness
	Johnson, Andrew	Brigadier general, USV (March 4, 1862)		U.S. Congressman from Tennessee (1843–1853); Governor of Tennessee (1853–1857, 1875); U.S. Senator from Tennessee (1857–1862); Military Governor of Tennessee (1862–1864); 16th Vice President of the United States (1865); 17th President of the United States (1865–1869)
	Johnson, Richard W.	Brigadier general, USV (October 11, 1861)	Major general, USA; Major general, USV	USMA, 1849
	Jones, Patrick Henry	Brigadier general, USV (December 6, 1864)		
	Judah, Henry Moses	Major, USA (June 30, 1862); Brigadier general, USV (March 21, 1862)		USMA, 1843

=== K ===
Image	Name	Substantive Rank	Brevet Rank	Notes
	Kane, Thomas Leiper	Brigadier general, USV (September 7, 1862)	Major general, USV (March 13, 1865)	Resigned November, 1863
	Kautz, August Valentin	Captain, USA (May, 1861); Brigadier general, USV (May 7, 1864)	Major general, USA (March 13, 1865); Major general, USV (March 13, 1865)	USMA, 1852; Commissioner, Lincoln assassination trial
	Kearny, Philip	Brigadier general, USV (May 17, 1861)		KIA, Battle of Chantilly (September 1, 1862) posthumous appt. Maj. Gen. USV confirmed March 9, 1863
	Keim, William High	Brigadier general, USV (September 20, 1861)		Died of illness, May 18, 1862
	Kelley, Benjamin Franklin	Brigadier general, USV (May 17, 1861)	Major general, USV (August 5, 1864)	
	Kenly, John Reese	Brigadier general, USV (August 22, 1862)	Major general, USV (March 13, 1865)	
	Ketcham, John Henry	Brigadier general, USV (October 23, 1865)	Major general, USV (March 13, 1865)	U.S. Congressman from New York (1865–1873, 1877–1893, 1897–1906)
	Ketchum, William Scott	Colonel, USA (1864); Brigadier general, USV (February 3, 1862)	Major general, USA (March 13, 1865)	USMA, 1834
	Keyes, Erasmus Darwin	Colonel, USA (1861); Major general, USV (May 5, 1862)	Brigadier general, USA	USMA, 1832; Resigned, May 6, 1864
	Kiernan, James Lawlor	Brigadier general, USV (August 1, 1863)		Resigned February 3, 1864; Warner lists; Eicher shows as not confirmed
	Kilpatrick, Hugh Judson	Major general, USV (June 18, 1865)	Major general, USA (March 13, 1865)	USMA, 1861; U.S. minister to Chile (1866–1870, 1881)
	Kimball, Nathan	Brigadier general, USV (April 16, 1862)	Major general, USV (February 1, 1865)	
	King, John Haskell	Colonel, USA (1865); Brigadier general, USV (November 29, 1862)	Major general, USA (March 13, 1865); Major general, USV (May 31, 1865)	
	King, Rufus	Brigadier general, USV (May 17, 1861)		USMA, 1833; Resigned October 1863; U.S. minister to the Papal States (1863–1867); Appointed minister in 1861, took a leave of absence to join the Army
	Kirby, Edmund	First Lieutenant, USA (1861); Brigadier general, USV (May 28, 1863)		USMA, 1861; DOW, Second Battle of Fredericksburg (w. May 3, 1863, d. May 28, 1863)
	Kirk, Edward Needles	Brigadier general, USV (November 29, 1862)		DOW, Battle of Stones River (w. December 31, 1862, d. July 21, 1863)
	Knipe, Joseph Farmer	Brigadier general, USV (November 29, 1862)		
	Krzyzanowski, Wladimir	Colonel, USV (1861)	Brigadier general, USV (March 2, 1865)	First cousin of Frédéric Chopin; Appointment as brigadier general, USV (November 29, 1862) not confirmed expired March 4, 1863, served at that grade until the Atlanta campaign Warner lists

=== L ===
Image	Name	Substantive Rank	Brevet Rank	Notes
	Lander, Frederick West	Brigadier general, USV (May 17, 1861)		Died of illness, March 2, 1862
	Lane, James H.	Brigadier general, USV (December 18, 1861)		U.S. Congressman from Indiana (1853–1855); U.S. Senator from Kansas (1861–1866); Commission cancelled March 21, 1862; Reinstated April 11, 1862
	Lauman, Jacob G.	Brigadier general, USV (March 21, 1862)	Major general, USV (March 13, 1865)	Relieved of duty, July 15, 1863
	Lawler, Michael Kelly	Brigadier general, USV (November 29, 1862)	Major general, USV (March 13, 1865)	
	Lawrence, Albert Gallatin	Captain, USV	Brigadier general, USV (March 25, 1865)	U.S. minister to Costa Rica (1867–1868); Son-in-law of Brigadier General Joseph Pannell Taylor and President Zachary Taylor; Brother-in-law of John McLean Taylor
	Ledlie, James H.	Brigadier general, USV (October 27, 1863)		Original appointment as brigadier general, USV (December 24, 1862) expired March 4, 1863; Relieved of command, July, 1864; Resigned January 23, 1865
	Lee, Albert Lindley	Brigadier general, USV (November 29, 1862)		Resigned May 4, 1865
	Leggett, Mortimer Dormer	Major general, USV (August 21, 1865)		
	Lightburn, Joseph Andrew Jackson	Brigadier general, USV (March 16, 1863)		
	Lockwood, Henry Hayes	Brigadier general, USV (August 8, 1861)		USMA, 1836
	Logan, John Alexander	Major general, USV (November 29, 1862)		Commander-in-chief, GAR (1868–1871); U.S. Congressman from Illinois (1859–1861, 1867–1871); U.S. Senator from Illinois (1871–1877, 1879–1886)
	Long, Eli	Captain, USA (May 24, 1861); Brigadier general, USV (August 18, 1864)	Major general, USA; Major general, USV	
	Lowell, Charles Russell	Brigadier general, USV (October 19, 1864)		KIA, Battle of Cedar Creek (October 19, 1864)
	Lucas, Thomas John	Brigadier general, USV (November 10, 1864)	Major general, USV (March 26, 1865)	
	Lyon, Nathaniel	Captain, USA; Brigadier general, USV (May 17, 1861)		USMA, 1841; KIA, Battle of Wilson's Creek (August 10, 1861); First Union general killed during the war Received the Thanks of Congress (December 24, 1861)
	Lytle, William Haines	Brigadier general, USV (November 29, 1862)		KIA, Battle of Chickamauga (September 20, 1863)

=== M ===
Image	Name	Substantive Rank	Brevet Rank	Notes
	McArthur, John	Brigadier general, USV (March 21, 1862)	Major general, USV	
	McCall, George Archibald	Brigadier general, USV (May 15, 1861)		USMA, 1822; Resigned March 31, 1863
	McCleery, James	Major, USV (1865)	Brigadier general, USV (March 13, 1865)	U.S. Congressman from Louisiana (1871)
	McClellan, George Brinton	Major general, USA (May 14, 1861)		USMA, 1846; General-in-Chief (November 1, 1861 – July 22, 1862); Relieved of duty November 7, 1862; Resigned November 8, 1864; Governor of New Jersey (1878–1881)
	McClernand, John Alexander	Major general, USV (May 21, 1862)		Resigned November 30, 1864; U.S. Congressman from Illinois (1843–1851, 1859–1861)
	McCook, Alexander McDowell	Major general, USV (July 17, 1862)		Highest-ranking of the fourteen "Fighting McCooks"; Brother of Daniel McCook, Jr., Edwin Stanton McCook, and Robert Latimer McCook; Cousin of Anson George McCook and Edward Moody McCook
	McCook, Daniel, Jr.	Brigadier general, USV (July 16, 1864)		DOW, Battle of Kennesaw Mountain (w. June 27, 1864, d. July 17, 1864); Brother of Alexander McDowell McCook, Edwin Stanton McCook, and Robert Latimer McCook; Cousin of Anson George McCook and Edward Moody McCook
	McCook, Edward Moody	First Lieutenant, USA (May 8, 1861); Brigadier general, USV (April 27, 1864)	Brigadier general, USA; Major general, USV	U.S. minister to Hawai'i (1866–1868); Territorial Governor of Colorado (1869–1873, 1874–1875); Brother of Anson George McCook; Cousin of Alexander McDowell McCook, Daniel McCook, Jr., Edwin Stanton McCook, and Robert Latimer McCook
	McCook, Robert Latimer	Brigadier general, USV (March 21, 1862)		DOW sustained near Huntsville, Alabama (w. August 5, 1862, d. August 6, 1862); Brother of Alexander McDowell McCook, Daniel McCook, Jr., and Edwin Stanton McCook; Cousin of Anson George McCook and Edward Moody McCook
	McDowell, Irvin	Brigadier general, USA (May 14, 1861); Major general, USV (March 14, 1862)		USMA, 1838
	McGinnis, George Francis	Brigadier general, USV (November 29, 1862)		
	McIntosh, John Baillie	Second Lieutenant, USA (1861); Brigadier general, USV (July 21, 1864)	Major general, USV (March 13, 1865); Major general, USA (March 13, 1865)	Brother of General James McQueen McIntosh, CSA
	McKean, Thomas Jefferson	Brigadier general, USV (November 21, 1861)	Major general, USV (March 13, 1865)	USMA, 1831
	Mackenzie, Ranald Slidell	Captain, USA; Brigadier general, USV (1864)	Brigadier general, USA; Major general, USV	USMA, 1862; Nephew of Confederate diplomat John Slidell
	McKinstry, Justus	Brigadier general, USV (September 2, 1861)		USMA, 1838; Dismissed from service for corruption, January 28, 1863
	McLean, Nathaniel Collins	Brigadier general, USV (November 29, 1862)		Resigned April 20, 1865
	McMillan, James Winning	Brigadier general, USV (November 29, 1862)	Major general, USV (March 5, 1865)	Resigned May 15, 1865
	McNeil, John	Brigadier general, USV (November 29, 1862)	Major general, USV (April 12, 1865)	Resigned April 12, 1865
	McPherson, James Birdseye	Brigadier general, USA (August 1, 1863); Major general, USV (October 8, 1862)		USMA, 1853; KIA, Battle of Atlanta (July 22, 1864); Only Union Army commander to be KIA
	Maltby, Jasper Adalmorn	Brigadier general, USV (August 4, 1863)		
	Mansfield, Joseph King Fenno	Brigadier general, USA (May 6, 1861); Major general, USV (July 18, 1862)		USMA, 1822; DOW, Battle of Antietam (w. September 17, 1862, d. September 18, 1862)
	Manson, Mahlon Dickerson	Brigadier general, USV (March 24, 1862)		Resigned due to wounds, December 21, 1864; U.S. Congressman from Indiana (1871–1873)
	Marcy, Randolph Barnes	Colonel, USA (August 9, 1861); Brigadier general, USV (September 28, 1861)	Brigadier general, USA (March 13, 1865); Major general, USA (March 13, 1865)	USMA, 1832; Inspector General, U.S. Army (1861–1881); Volunteer appointment expired March 4, 1863; Father-in-law of George Brinton McClellan
	Marsh, Charles Carroll	Brigadier general, USV (November 29, 1862)		Appointment withdrawn Resigned April 22, 1863
	Marston, Gilman	Brigadier general, USV (November 29, 1862)		Resigned April 20, 1865; U.S. Congressman from New Hampshire (1859–1863, 1865–1867); U.S. Senator from New Hampshire (1889)
	Martindale, John Henry	Brigadier general, USV (August 9, 1861)	Major general, USV (March 13, 1865)	USMA, 1835; Resigned September 13, 1864
	Mason, John Sanford	Major, USA (1864); Brigadier general, USV (November 29, 1862)	Brigadier general, USA (1865)	USMA, 1847
	Matthies, Charles Leopold (b. Matthies, Karl Leopold)	Brigadier general, USV (November 29, 1862)		First officer to muster a company of volunteers for U.S. service (January 9, 1861); Resigned May 16, 1864
	Meade, George Gordon	Major general, USA (August 18, 1864)		USMA, 1835; Received the Thanks of Congress (January 28, 1864); Namesake of Fort Meade, Maryland
	Meagher, Thomas Francis	Brigadier general, USV (February 3, 1862)		Resigned May 14, 1863, resignation rejected Resigned May 15, 1865
	Meigs, Montgomery Cunningham	Brigadier general, USA (May 15, 1861)	Major general, USA (July 5, 1864)	USMA, 1836; Quartermaster General (1861–1882)
	Meredith, Solomon	Brigadier general, USV (October 6, 1862)	Major general, USV (August 14, 1865)	
	Meredith, Sullivan Amory	Brigadier general, USV (November 29, 1862)		
	Merritt, Wesley	Captain, USA (1862); Major general, USV (April 1, 1865)	Major general, USA (1865)	USMA, 1860; Superintendent, USMA (1882–1887); Military Governor of the Philippines (1898)
	Miles, Nelson Appleton	Major general, USV (October 21, 1865)		MOH, Battle of Chancellorsville (May 2–3, 1863); Last General-in-Chief (1895–1902); position replaced with Chief of Staff upon his retirement Military Governor of Puerto Rico (1898); Commander-in-chief, MOLLUS (1919–1925); Last surviving Major General (d. May 15, 1925)
	Miller, John Franklin	Brigadier general, USV (January 5, 1864)	Major general, USV (March 13, 1865)	U.S. Senator from California (1881–1886)
	Miller, Stephen	Brigadier general, USV (October 26, 1863)		Resigned January 18, 1864; Governor of Minnesota (1864–1865)
	Milroy, Robert Huston	Major general, USV (November 29, 1862)		
	Mitchel, Ormsby MacKnight	Major general, USV (April 11, 1862)		USMA, 1829; Died of yellow fever, October 30, 1862
	Mitchell, John Grant	Brigadier general, USV (January 12, 1865)	Major general, USV (March 13, 1865)	Resigned July 3, 1865
	Mitchell, Robert Byington	Brigadier general, USV (April 8, 1862)		Territorial Governor of New Mexico (1866–1869)
	Montgomery, William Reading	Brigadier general, USV (May 17, 1861)		USMA, 1825; Resigned April 4, 1864
	Morell, George Webb	Brigadier general, USV (August 9, 1861)		USMA, 1835; Appointment as major general, USV (July 4, 1862) expired March 4, 1863; Mustered out December 15, 1864
	Morgan, Charles Hale	Captain, USA (August 5, 1861); Brigadier general, USV (May 21, 1865)		USMA, 1857
	Morgan, Edwin Denison	Major general, USV (September 28, 1861)		Resigned January 1, 1863; First (and longest-sitting) Chairman of the Republican National Committee (1856–1864, 1872–1876); Governor of New York (1859–1862); U.S. Senator from New York (1863–1869)
	Morgan, George Washington	Brigadier general, USV (November 21, 1861)	Brigadier general, USA (1848)	USMA (class of 1845), resigned 1843; Resigned volunteer commission June 8, 1863; U.S. minister to Portugal (1858–1861); U.S. Congressman from Ohio (1869-1869, 1871–1873)
	Morgan, James Dada	Brigadier general, USV (July 17, 1862)	Major general, USV (March 19, 1865)	
	Morris, William Hopkins	Brigadier general, USV (November 29, 1862)	Major general, USV (March 13, 1865)	USMA, 1851
	Morton, James St. Clair	Major, USA (July 3, 1863); Brigadier general, USV (November 29, 1862)		USMA, 1851; Resigned volunteer commission November 7, 1863; KIA, Siege of Petersburg (July 17, 1864)
	Mott, Gershom	Major general, USV (May 26, 1865)		
	Mower, Joseph Anthony	Major general, USV (August 12, 1864)	Major general, USA (March 13, 1865)	

=== N ===
Image	Name	Substantive Rank	Brevet Rank	Notes
	Nagle, James	Brigadier general, USV (March 13, 1863)		Original appointment as brigadier general, USV (September 10, 1862) expired March 4, 1863 due to lack of Senate confirmation Resigned, May 9, 1863; Recommissioned as Colonel (July 4, 1863 – August 2, 1863); Recommissioned again as Colonel (1864); Resigned, November 5, 1864
	Naglee, Henry Morris	Brigadier general, USV (February 12, 1862)		USMA, 1835; Relieved, September 23, 1863; Mustered out, April 4, 1864
	Negley, James S.	Major general, USV (November 29, 1862)		Relieved, September, 1864; Resigned, January 19, 1865; U.S. Congressman from Pennsylvania (1869–1887)
	Neill, Thomas Hewson	Major, USA; Brigadier general, USV (November 29, 1863)	Brigadier general, USA; Major general, USV	USMA, 1847; Superintendent, USMA (1876–1879)
	Nelson, William	Major general, USV (July 17, 1862)		Only naval officer in either army to reach major general Shot and killed in a private altercation by Brigadier General Jefferson C. Davis (September 29, 1862)
	Newton, John	Colonel, USA; Major general, USV (March 30, 1863)	Major general, USA (March 13, 1865); Major general, USA (March 13, 1865)	USMA, 1842 son of Congressman Thomas Newton, Jr. Volunteer rank revoked April 18, 1864
	Nickerson, Franklin Stillman	Brigadier general, USV (November 29, 1862)		Relieved, July 22, 1864; Resigned May 13, 1865

=== O ===
Image	Name	Substantive Rank	Brevet Rank	Notes
	Oglesby, Richard James "Uncle Dick"	Major general, USV (November 29, 1862)		Resigned, May 26, 1864; Governor of Illinois (1865–1869, 1873, 1885–1889); U.S. Senator from Illinois (1873–1879); Present at the deathbed of Abraham Lincoln
	Oliver, John Morrison	Brigadier general, USV (January 12, 1865)	Major general, USV	
	Opdycke, Emerson (b. Opdycke, Samuel Emerson)	Brigadier general, USV (July 26, 1865)	Major general, USV (March 13, 1865)	Postwar appointment, resigned January 1, 1866 before Senate confirmation February 23, 1866; Warner, Eicher list
	Ord, Edward Otho Cresap	Colonel, USA; Major general, USV (May 3, 1862)		USMA, 1839
	Orme, William Ward	Brigadier general, USV (November 29, 1862)		Resigned, April 20, 1864
	Osborn, Thomas Ogden	Brigadier general, USV (May 1, 1865)	Major general, USV	U.S. minister to Argentina (1874–1885)
	Osterhaus, Peter Joseph	Major general, USV (July 23, 1864)		
	Owen, Joshua Thomas	Brigadier general, USV (November 29, 1862)		Commission never confirmed by Senate, expired March 4, 1863; Relieved of duty, June, 1864; Mustered out, July, 1864

=== P ===
Image	Name	Substantive Rank	Brevet Rank	Notes
	Paine, Charles Jackson	Brigadier general, USV (July 4, 1864)	Major general, USV (March 13, 1865)	
	Paine, Eleazar Arthur	Brigadier general, USV (September 3, 1861)		USMA, 1839; Resigned April 5, 1865; Cousin of Halbert Eleazer Paine
	Paine, Halbert Eleazer	Brigadier general, USV (April 9, 1863)		Resigned May 15, 1865; U.S. Congressman from Wisconsin (1865–1871); Cousin of Eleazer Arthur Paine
	Palmer, Innis Newton	Lieutenant colonel, USA (1863); Brigadier general, USV (September 23, 1861)	Brigadier general, USA; Major general, USV	USMA, 1846
	Palmer, John McCauley	Major general, USV (November 29, 1862)		Governor of Illinois (1869–1873); U.S. Senator from Illinois (1891–1897); Commander-in-chief, GAR (1891–1892)
	Parke, John Grubb	Major general, USV (July 18, 1862)	Major general, USA	USMA, 1849; Superintendent, USMA (1887–1889)
	Parsons, Lewis Baldwin	Brigadier general, USV (May 11, 1865)	Major general, USV	
	Patrick, Marsena Rudolph	Brigadier general, USV (March 20, 1862)	Major general, USV (March 13, 1865)	USMA, 1835
	Patterson, Francis Engle	Brigadier general, USV (April 11, 1862)		"Killed by accidental discharge of his own pistol" (November 22, 1862); Son of Robert Patterson; Brother-in-law of John Joseph Abercrombie
	Patterson, Robert	Major general, Pennsylvania Volunteers	Mexican-American War veteran Returned to duty with PA volunteers	Commanded Department of Pennsylvania; Failed to retake Harpers Ferry or stop Stonewall Jackson move; Discharged July, 1861; Father of Francis E. Patterson; Father-in-law of John Joseph Abercrombie
	Paul, Gabriel René	Brigadier general, USA (February 16, 1865); Brigadier general, USV (April 18, 1863)		USMA, 1834; Retired February 16, 1865, due to blinding at Battle of Gettysburg (July 1, 1863); Original appointment as brigadier general, USV (September 5, 1862) not confirmed, expired March 4, 1863
	Peck, John James	Major general, USV (July 4, 1862)		USMA, 1843
	Pennypacker, Galusha	Brigadier general, USV (February 18, 1865)	Major general, USV (March 13, 1865)	MOH, Battle of Fort Fisher (January 15, 1865); Youngest general in U.S. history
	Penrose, William Henry	First Lieutenant, USA (May 14, 1861); Brigadier general, USV (July 27, 1865)		Postwar appointment, nominated January 13, 1866 confirmed February 23, 1866; Warner, Eicher list
	Phelps, John Smith	Brigadier general, USV (July 19, 1862)		Appointment expired March 4, 1863; U.S. Congressman from Missouri (1845–1863); Military Governor of Arkansas (1862–1863); Governor of Missouri (1877–1881)
	Phelps, John Wolcott	Brigadier general, USV (May 17, 1861)		Resigned, August 21, 1862); USMA, 1836; Half-brother of Charles Edward Phelps
	Piatt, Abram Sanders (aka Piatt, Abraham Sanders)	Brigadier general, USV (April 30, 1862)		Resigned February 17, 1863
	Pierce, Byron Root	Brigadier general, USV (June 7, 1864)	Major general, USV (March 13, 1865)	
	Pile, William Anderson	Brigadier general, USV (December 26, 1863)	Major general, USV (April, 1865)	U.S. Congressman from Missouri (1867–1869); Territorial Governor of New Mexico (1869–1871); U.S. minister to Venezuela (1871–1874)
	Pitcher, Thomas Gamble	Captain, USA (1858); Brigadier general, USV (November 29, 1862)	Brigadier general, USA (March 13, 1865)	USMA, 1845; Superintendent, USMA (1866–1870)
	Pleasonton, Alfred	Major, USA (1862); Major general, USV (June 22, 1863)	Major general, USA (March 13, 1865)	USMA, 1844
	Plummer, Joseph Bennett	Major, USA (April, 1862); Brigadier general, USV (October 27, 1861)		USMA, 1841; Died "Of Wound and Exposure in the Active Field", August 9, 1862
	Poe, Orlando Metcalfe	Captain, USA; Brigadier general, USV (November 29, 1862)	Brigadier general, USA (March 13, 1865)	USMA, 1856; Volunteer appointment expired March 4, 1863, not confirmed
	Pope, John	Brigadier general, USA (July 14, 1862); Major general, USV (March 21, 1862)		USMA, 1842; Brother-in-law of Force, Manning Ferguson
	Porter, Andrew	Colonel, USA (May 14, 1861); Brigadier general, USV (May 18, 1861)		Mustered out of volunteer service April 4, 1864; Resigned regular commission April 20, 1864; USMA (class of 1844), resigned in 1840; Cousin of Horace Porter; First cousin (once removed) of Mary Todd Lincoln
	Porter, Fitz John	Colonel, USA (1861); Major general, USV (July 4, 1862)	Brigadier general, USA (1862)	USMA, 1845; Relieved September 5, 1862 court-martialed and convicted (January 10, 1863); Dismissed from service January 21, 1863; Exonerated March 19, 1879; Nephew of David Dixon Porter, USN and William David Porter, USN
	Potter, Edward Elmer	Brigadier general, USV (November 29, 1862)	Major general, USV (March 13, 1865)	
	Potter, Joseph Haydn	Major, USA (1863); Brigadier general, USV (May 1, 1865)	Brigadier general, USA (March 13, 1865)	USMA, 1843
	Potter, Robert Brown	Major general, USV (September 29, 1865)		
	Potts, Benjamin Franklin	Brigadier general, USV (January 12, 1865)	Major general, USV (March 13, 1865)	Territorial Governor of Montana (1870–1883)
	Powell, William Henry	Brigadier general, USV (October 19, 1864)	Major general, USV (March 13, 1865)	MOH for actions at Sinking Creek (November 26, 1862); Resigned January 5, 1865
	Pratt, Calvin Edward	Brigadier general, USV (September 13, 1862)		Resigned April 25, 1863
	Prentiss, Benjamin Mayberry	Major general, USV (November 29, 1862)		Resigned October 28, 1863
	Prince, Henry	Major, USA (1855); Brigadier general, USV (April 20, 1862)	Brigadier general, USA (March 13, 1865)	USMA, 1835

=== Q ===
Image	Name	Substantive Rank	Brevet Rank	Notes
	Quinby, Isaac Ferdinand	Brigadier general, USV (March 17, 1862)		USMA, 1843; Resigned, December 31, 1863

=== R ===
Image	Name	Substantive Rank	Brevet Rank	Notes
	Ramsay, George Douglas	Brigadier general, USA (September 15, 1863)	Major general, USA (March 13, 1865)	USMA, 1820; Retired September 12, 1864; Chief of Ordnance (1863–1864)
	Ransom, Thomas Edward Greenfield	Brigadier general, USV (November 29, 1862)	Major general, USV (September 1, 1864)	Died October 29, 1864
	Raum, Green Berry	Brigadier general, USV (February 15, 1865)		
	Rawlins, John Aaron	Brigadier general, USA (March 3, 1865)	Major general, USA (April 9, 1865); Major general, USV (February 24, 1865)	Chief of Staff to General Ulysses S. Grant; Secretary of War (1869)
	Reid, Hugh Thompson	Brigadier general, USV (April 9, 1863)		Resigned April 4, 1864
	Reilly, James William	Brigadier general, USV (July 30, 1864)		Resigned April 20, 1865
	Reno, Jesse Lee	Captain, USA; Major general, USV (July 18, 1862)		USMA, 1846; KIA, Battle of South Mountain (September 14, 1862)
	Revere, Joseph Warren	Brigadier general, USV (October 25, 1862)		Forced to resign August 10, 1863; Grandson of Paul Revere; Cousin of Paul Joseph Revere
	Reynolds, John Fulton	Lieutenant colonel, USA (May 14, 1861); Major general, USV (November 29, 1862)		USMA, 1841; Superintendent, USMA (1860–1861); KIA, Battle of Gettysburg (July 1, 1863)
	Reynolds, Joseph Jones	Major general, USV (November 29, 1862)		USMA, 1843
	Rice, Americus Vespucius	Brigadier general, USV (May 31, 1865)		U.S. Congressman from Ohio (1875–1879)
	Rice, Elliott Warren	Brigadier general, USV (June 22, 1864)	Major general, USV (March 13, 1865)	Brother of Samuel Allen Rice
	Rice, James Clay	Brigadier general, USV (August 17, 1863)		KIA, Battle of Spotsylvania (May 10, 1864)
	Rice, Samuel Allen	Brigadier general, USV (August 4, 1863)		DOW, Battle of Jenkins' Ferry (w. April 30, 1864, d. July 6, 1864); Brother of Elliott Warren Rice
	Richardson, Israel Bush	Major general, USV (July 4, 1862)		USMA, 1841; DOW, Battle of Antietam (w. September 17, 1862, d. November 3, 1862)
	Ricketts, James Brewerton	Major, USA; Brigadier general, USV (July 21, 1861)	Major general, USA (March 13, 1865); Major general, USV (August 1, 1864)	USMA, 1839
	Ripley, James Wolfe	Brigadier general, USA (August 3, 1861)	Major general, USA (March 13, 1865)	USMA, 1814; Chief of Ordnance (1861–1863); Uncle of General Roswell Sabine Ripley, CSA
	Roberts, Benjamin Stone	Major, USA (May 13, 1861); Brigadier general, USV (July 16, 1862)	Brigadier general, USA (March 13, 1865); Major general, USV (March 13, 1865)	USMA, 1835
	Robinson, James Sidney	Brigadier general, USV (January 12, 1865)		U.S. Congressman from Ohio (1881–1885)
	Robinson, John Cleveland	Captain, USA; Brigadier general, USV (April 28, 1862)	Major general, USA; Major general, USV	MOH, Battle of Laurel Hill (May 8, 1864); USMA (class of 1839), dismissed 1836; Commander-in-chief, GAR (1877–1879)
	Rodman, Isaac Peace	Brigadier general, USV (April 28, 1862)		DOW, Battle of Antietam (w. September 17, 1862, d. September 30, 1862)
	Rosecrans, William Starke	Brigadier general, USA (May 16, 1861); Major general, USV (March 21, 1862)		USMA, 1842; Rejected original appointment as major general, USV (September 17, 1862); Received the Thanks of Congress (March 3, 1863); U.S. minister to Mexico (1868–1869); U.S. Congressman from California (1881–1885)
	Ross, Leonard Fulton	Brigadier general, USV (April 26, 1862)		Resigned July 22, 1863
	Rousseau, Lovell Harrison	Major general, USV (October 8, 1862)		U.S. Congressman from Kentucky (1865–1866, 1866–1867); Father-in-law of Louis Douglass Watkins
	Rowley, Thomas Algeo	Brigadier general, USV (November 29, 1862)		Convicted by Court-martial (April 23, 1864) for actions at the Battle of Gettysburg. Conviction overturned by Secretary of War Edwin Stanton; Resigned December 29, 1864
	Rucker, Daniel Henry	Major, USA (August, 1861); Brigadier general, USV (May 23, 1863)	Major general, USA (March 13, 1865); Major general, USV (March 13, 1865)	Quartermaster General of the United States Army (1882)
	Ruger, Thomas Howard	Brigadier general, USV (November 29, 1862)	Major general, USV (November 30, 1864)	USMA, 1854; Military Governor of Georgia (1868); Superintendent, USMA (1871–1876)
	Russell, David Allen	Major, USA (1862); Brigadier general, USV (November 29, 1862)	Major general, USA	USMA, 1845; KIA, Battle of Opequon (September 19, 1864)
Brigadier General Friend Smith Rutherford, 97th Illinois Infantry Volunteers, died June 20, 1864.	Rutherford, Friend Smith	Colonel, USV (Sept. 1862); Brigadier general, USV (June 27, 1864)		Died from disease on June 20, 1864 after resigning his commission 5 days earlier. Brother to Bvt. Brigadiers George V. Rutherford and Reuben C. Rutherford.

=== S ===
Image	Name	Substantive Rank	Brevet Rank	Notes
	Salomon, Frederick (aka Salomon, Friedrich)	Brigadier general, USV (July 16, 1862)	Major general, USV (March 13, 1865)	Brother of Wisconsin Governor Edward Salomon
	Sanborn, John Benjamin	Brigadier general, USV (August 4, 1863)	Major general, USV (February 10, 1865)	
	Sanders, William Price	Captain, USA (May 14, 1861); Colonel, USV (March 4, 1863)		USMA, 1856; Appointed brig. gen., USV (October 18, 1863), not confirmed by U.S. Senate. Listed as a "might have been" by Eicher, 2001, pp. 609-610 because not confirmed Warner, 1964, pp. 419-420 lists him as a brig. gen. DOW, Siege of Knoxville (w. November 18, 1863, d. November 19, 1863)
	Saxton, Rufus	Captain, USA (May 13, 1861); Brigadier general, USV (April 15, 1862)	Brigadier general, USA (April 9, 1865); Major general, USV (January 12, 1865)	USMA, 1849; MOH for defense of Harper's Ferry during Jackson's Valley Campaign (May 26–30, 1862)
	Scammon, Eliakim Parker	Brigadier general, USV (October 15, 1862)		USMA, 1837
	Schenck, Robert Cumming	Major general, USV (August 30, 1862)		Resigned December 5, 1863; U.S. Congressman from Ohio (1843–1851, 1863–1871); U.S. minister to Brazil (1851–1853); U.S. minister to the Court of St. James (1871–1876)
	Schimmelfennig, Alexander	Brigadier general, USV (November 29, 1862)		Died of tuberculosis September 5, 1865
	Schoepf, Albin Francisco	Brigadier general, USV (September 30, 1861)		
	Schofield, John McAllister	Brigadier general, USA (November 30, 1864); Major general, USV (November 29, 1862)	Major general, USA (March 13, 1865)	USMA, 1853; MOH, Battle of Wilson's Creek (August 10, 1861); Secretary of War (1868–1869); Superintendent, USMA (1876–1881); General-in-Chief of the U.S. Army (1888–1895); Commander-in-chief, MOLLUS (1899–1903)
	Schurz, Carl	Major general, USV (March 14, 1863)		Resigned May 6, 1865; U.S. minister to Spain (1861); U.S. Senator from Missouri (1869–1875); Secretary of the Interior (1877–1881)
	Scott, Robert Kingston	Brigadier general, USV (January 12, 1865)	Major general, USV (December 5, 1865)	Governor of South Carolina (1868–1872)
	Scott, Winfield	Major general, USA (June 25, 1841)	Lieutenant general, USA (March 29, 1847)	Retired November 1, 1861; General-in-Chief (1841–1861); Twice received the Congressional Gold Medal (November 3, 1814; March 9, 1848); Author of the Anaconda Plan
	Sedgwick, John	Colonel, USA (April 25, 1861); Major general, USV (July 4, 1862)		USMA, 1837; KIA, Battle of Spotsylvania Court House (May 9, 1864); Highest-ranked Union general KIA
	Seward, William Henry, Jr.	Brigadier general, USV (September 13, 1864)		Resigned June 1, 1865; Son of Secretary of State William Henry Seward
	Seymour, Truman	Captain, USA (November 22, 1860; Brigadier general, USV (April 28, 1862)	Major general, USA (March 13, 1865); Major general, USV (March 13, 1865)	USMA, 1846
	Shackelford, James Murrell	Brigadier general, USV (January 2, 1863)		Resigned January 18, 1864
	Shaler, Alexander	Brigadier general, USV (May 26, 1863)	Major general, USV (July 27, 1863)	MOH, Second Battle of Fredericksburg (May 3, 1863)
	Shepard, Isaac Fitzgerald	Brigadier general, USV (October 27, 1863)		Not confirmed; appointment expired July 4, 1864
	Shepley, George Foster	Brigadier general, USV (July 18, 1862)		Resigned July 1, 1865; Military Governor of Louisiana (1862–1864)
	Sheridan, Philip Henry	Major general, USA (November 8, 1864)		USMA, 1853; Received the Thanks of Congress (February 9, 1865); General-in-Chief (1883–1888); Commander-in-chief, MOLLUS (1886–1888)
	Sherman, Francis Trowbridge	Brigadier general, USV (July 21, 1865)		
	Sherman, Thomas West	Lieutenant colonel, USA (May 14, 1861); Brigadier general, USV (May 17, 1861)	Major general, USA (March 13, 1865); Major general, USV (March 13, 1865)	USMA, 1836
	Sherman, William Tecumseh	Major general, USA (August 12, 1864)		USMA, 1841; Twice received the Thanks of Congress (February 19, 1864; January 19, 1865); General-in-Chief (1869–1883)
	Shields, James	Brigadier general, USV (August 19, 1861)		Resigned March 28, 1863; U.S. Senator from Illinois (1849–1855); U.S. Senator from Minnesota (1858–1859); U.S. Senator from Missouri (1879)
	Sibley, Henry Hastings	Brigadier general, USV (March 20, 1863)	Major general, USV (November 29, 1865)	Original appointment as brig. gen., USV (September 29, 1862) expired March 4, 1863; Congressional Delegate from the Wisconsin Territory (1848–1849); Congressional Delegate from the Minnesota Territory (1849–1853); 1st Governor of Minnesota (1858–1860)
	Sickles, Daniel Edgar	Major general, USV (November 29, 1862)		MOH, Battle of Gettysburg (July 2, 1863); U.S. Congressman from New York (1857–1861, 1893–1895); U.S. minister to Spain (1869–1874)
	Sigel, Franz	Major general, USV (March 21, 1862)		Resigned May 4, 1865
	Sill, Joshua Woodrow	Brigadier general, USV (July 16, 1862)		USMA, 1853; KIA, Battle of Stones River (December 31, 1862)
	Slack, James Richard	Brigadier general, USV (November 10, 1864)	Major general, USV (March 13, 1865)	
	Slemmer, Adam Jacoby	Lieutenant colonel, USA (February 8, 1864); Brigadier general, USV (November 29, 1862)	Brigadier general, USA (March 13, 1865)	USMA, 1850
	Slocum, Henry Warner	Major general, USV (July 4, 1862)		USMA, 1852; Resigned September 28, 1865; U.S. Congressman from New York (1869–1973, 1883–1885)
	Slough, John Potts	Brigadier general, USV (August 25, 1862)		
	Smith, Andrew Jackson	Lieutenant colonel, USA; *May 9, 1864); Major general, USV (May 12, 1864)	Major general, USA (March 13, 1865)	USMA, 1838
	Smith, Charles Ferguson	Colonel, USA (September 9, 1861); Major general, USV (March 21, 1862)		USMA, 1825; Died from infection April 25, 1862
	Smith, Giles Alexander	Major general, USV (November 24, 1865)		Brother of Morgan Lewis Smith; Last Major General of volunteers by seniority
	Smith, Green Clay	Brigadier general, USV (June 11, 1862)	Major general, USV (March 13, 1865)	Resigned December 4, 1863; U.S. Congressman from Kentucky (1863–1866); Territorial Governor of Montana (1866–1869)
	Smith, Gustavus Adolphus	Brigadier general, USV (September 19, 1862)	Brigadier general, USV (March 13, 1865)	Not confirmed; appointment expired March 4, 1863
	Smith, John Eugene	Brigadier general, USV (November 29, 1862)	Major general, USV (January 12, 1865)	
	Smith, Morgan Lewis (aka Sanford, Martin L.)	Brigadier general, USV (July 16, 1862)		Resigned July 12, 1865; Brother of Giles Alexander Smith
	Smith, Thomas Church Haskell	Brigadier general, USV (November 29, 1862)		
	Smith, Thomas Kilby	Brigadier general, USV (August 11, 1863)	Major general, USV (March 13, 1865)	
	Smith, William Farrar	Major (March 3, 1863); Major general, USV (March 9, 1864)	Major general, USA (March 13, 1865)	USMA, 1845; Original appointment as major general, USV (July 4, 1862) expired March 4, 1863
	Smith, William Sooy	Brigadier general, USV (April 15, 1862)		Resigned July 15, 1864
	Smyth, Thomas Alfred	Brigadier general, USV (October 1, 1864)	Major general, USV (April 7, 1865)	DOW, Battle of Cumberland Church (w. April 7, 1865, d. April 9, 1865); Last Union general killed during the war
	Spears, James Gallant	Brigadier general, USV (March 5, 1862)		Arrested February 6, 1864 for insubordination; Court-martialed and dismissed from service August 30, 1864
	Spinola, Francis Barretto	Brigadier general, USV (October 1, 1862)		Resigned June 8, 1865; U.S. Congressman from New York (1887–1893)
	Sprague, John Wilson	Brigadier general, USV (July 30, 1864)	Major general, USV (March 13, 1865)	MOH, Battle of Atlanta (July 22, 1864)
	Stahel, Julius (b. Stahel-Számwald, Julius H.)	Major general, USV (March 14, 1863)		MOH, Battle of Piedmont (June 5, 1864); Resigned February 8, 1865
	Stanley, David Sloane	Major, USA (December 1, 1863); Major general, USV (November 29, 1862)	Major general, USA (March 13, 1865)	USMA, 1852; MOH, Battle of Franklin (November 30, 1864)
	Stannard, George Jerrison	Brigadier general, USV (March 11, 1863)	Major general, USV (October 28, 1864)	
	Starkweather, John Converse	Brigadier general, USV (July 17, 1863)		Resigned May 11, 1865
	Stedman, Griffin Alexander, Jr.	Colonel, USV (September 17, 1862)	Brigadier general, USV; August 5, 1864	DOW, Siege of Petersburg (w. August 5, 1864, d. August 6, 1864)
	Steedman, James Blair	Major general, USV (April 20, 1864)		
	Steele, Frederick	Lieutenant Colonel (August 26, 1863); Major general, USV (November 29, 1862)	Major general, USA (March 13, 1865)	USMA, 1843
	Stevens, Isaac Ingalls	Major general, USV (July 4, 1862)		USMA, 1839; KIA, Battle of Chantilly (September 1, 1862); Territorial Governor of Washington (1853–1857); Congressional Delegate for the Washington Territory (1857–1861); Father of Hazard Stevens
	Stevenson, John Dunlap	Brigadier general, USV (November 29, 1862)	Major general, USV (March 13, 1865)	Resigned April 22, 1864; Reappointed brigadier general, USV August 7, 1864
	Stevenson, Thomas Greely	Brigadier general, USV (March 14, 1863)		KIA, Battle of Spotsylvania Court House (May 10, 1864); Original appointment as brigadier general, USV (December 24, 1862) expired March 4, 1863
	Stokes, James Hughes	Brigadier general, USV (July 20, 1865)		USMA, 1835; postwar appointment but listed by Eicher and Warner
	Stolbrand, Charles John (b. Möller, Carl Johan; later: Ståhlbrand, Carl Johan)	Brigadier general, USV (February 18, 1865)		
	Stone, Charles Pomeroy	Colonel, USA (May 14, 1861); Brigadier general, USV (May 17, 1861)		USMA, 1845; Mustered out of volunteer service April 4, 1864; Resigned September 13, 1864
	Stoneman, George	Lieutenant colonel, USA (March 30, 1864); Major general, USV (November 29, 1862)	Major general, USA (March 13, 1865)	USMA, 1846; Governor of California (1883–1887)
	Stoughton, Edwin Henry	Brigadier general, USV (November 5, 1862)		USMA, 1859; Not confirmed, appointment expired March 4, 1863; Captured by John S. Mosby
	Strong, George Crockett	Captain, USA (March 3, 1863); Major general, USV (July 18, 1863)		USMA, 1857; DOW, Second Battle of Fort Wagner (w. July 18, 1863, d. July 30, 1863)
	Strong, William Kerley	Brigadier general, USV (September 28, 1861)		Appointed brig. gen., USV by President Abraham Lincoln, September 28, 1861; Command of Benton Barracks, Districts of Cairo and St Louis. Resigned his commission on October 20, 1863.
	Stuart, David	Brigadier general, USV (November 29, 1862)		Not confirmed, appointment expired March 4, 1863; Resigned April 3, 1863; U.S. Congressman from Michigan (1853–1855)
	Sturgis, Samuel Davis	Lieutenant colonel, USA (October 27, 1863); Brigadier general, USV (October 10, 1861)	Major general, USA (March 13, 1865)	USMA, 1846
	Sullivan, Jeremiah Cutler	Brigadier general, USV (April 28, 1862)		
	Sully, Alfred	Major, USA (March 15, 1862); Brigadier general, USV (September 26, 1862)	Brigadier general, USA (March 13, 1865); Major general, USV (March 8, 1865)	USMA, 1841
	Sumner, Edwin Vose	Brigadier general, USA (March 16, 1861); Major general, USV (July 4, 1862)	Major general, USA (May 31, 1862)	Died of a heart attack March 21, 1863
	Swayne, Wager	Major general, USV (June 20, 1865)		MOH, Second Battle of Corinth (October 4, 1862); Last Major General of volunteers appointed (May 1, 1866); Son of Supreme Court Justice Noah Haynes Swayne
	Sweeny, Thomas William	Major, USA (October 20, 1863); Brigadier General USV (November 29, 1862)		
	Sykes, George	Lieutenant colonel, USA (October 16, 1863); Major general, USV (November 29, 1862)	Major general, USA (March 13, 1865)	USMA, 1838

=== T ===
Image	Name	Substantive Rank	Brevet Rank	Notes
	Taylor, George William	Brigadier general, USV (May 9, 1862)		DOW, Bull Run Bridge (w. August 27, 1862, d. September 1, 1862)
	Taylor, Joseph Pannell	Brigadier general, USA (February 9, 1863)		Commissary General of the Army (1861–1864); Died June 29, 1864; Brother of President Zachary Taylor; Uncle of generals Richard Taylor, CSA and David Rumph Jones, CSA; Father of John McLean Taylor; Father-in-law of Albert Gallatin Lawrence
	Taylor, Nelson	Brigadier general, USV (September 7, 1862)		Resigned January 19, 1863; Appointment withdrawn February 12, 1865; Warner lists; Eicher lists as "might have been" U.S. Congressman from New York (1865–1867)
	Terrill, William R.	Captain, USA (May 14, 1861); Brigadier general, USV (September 9, 1862)		USMA, 1853; KIA, Battle of Perryville (October 8, 1862); Brother of Confederate general James Barbour Terrill
	Terry, Alfred Howe	Brigadier general, USA (January 15, 1865); Major general, USV (January 16, 1865)		Received the Thanks of Congress (January 24, 1865)
	Terry, Henry Dwight	Brigadier general, USV (July 17, 1862)		Resigned February 7, 1865
	Thayer, John Milton	Brigadier general, USV (March 13, 1863)	Major general, USV (March 13, 1865)	Original appointment as brig. gen. USV expired March 4, 1863; Territorial Governor of Wyoming (1875–1878); Governor of Nebraska (1887–1891). Remained in office until February 8, 1892, claiming successor was not a U.S. citizen
	Thayer, Sylvanus	Colonel, USA	Brigadier general, USA (May 31, 1863)	Retired June 1, 1863; Superintendent, USMA (1817–1833); Longest-serving West Point superintendent Oldest officer brevetted brigadier general
	Thomas, George Henry	Major general, USA (January 16, 1865)		USMA, 1840; Received the Thanks of Congress (March 3, 1865)
	Thomas, Henry Goddard	Captain, USA; Brigadier general, USV (November 30, 1864)	Brigadier general, USA (March 13, 1865); Major general, USV (March 13, 1865)	
	Thomas, Lorenzo	Brigadier general, USA (August 3, 1861)	Major general, USA; March 13, 1865	USMA, 1823; Adjutant General of the Army (1861–1869)
	Thomas, Stephen	Brigadier general, USV (February 1, 1865)		MOH, Battle of Cedar Creek (October 19, 1864); Mustered out as colonel, USV (January 21, 1865)
	Thruston, Charles Mynn	Brigadier general, USV (September 7, 1861)		USMA, 1814; Not confirmed, appointment withdrawn at own request, February 27, 1862. Resigned April 17, 1862
	Tibbits, William B.	Brigadier general, USV (October 18, 1865)	Major general, USV (March 13, 1865)	
	Tillson, Davis	Brigadier general, USV (November 29, 1862)		USMA (class of 1853); left due to amputation of leg, 1851
	Todd, John Blair Smith	Brigadier general, USV (September 19, 1861)		USMA, 1837; Appointment as brig. gen., USV expired June 17, 1862; Delegate to Congress for Dakota Territory (1861–1863, 1864–1865); Cousin of Mary Todd Lincoln
	Torbert, Alfred Thomas Archimedes	Captain, USA (September 25, 1861); Brigadier general, USV (November 29, 1862)	Major general, USA (March 13, 1865); Major general, USV (March 13, 1865)	USMA, 1855; Also nominated, confirmed as 1st lt., CSA refused appointment
	Totten, Joseph Gilbert	Brigadier general, USA (March 3, 1863)	Major general, USA (1864)	USMA, 1805 (tenth graduate of West Point); Chief of Engineers (1838–1864); Died of pneumonia (April 22, 1864)
	Tower, Zealous Bates	Lieutenant colonel, USA (November, 1865); Brigadier general, USV (November 23, 1861)	Major general, USA (March 13, 1865); Major general, USV (March 13, 1865)	USMA, 1841; Superintendent, USMA (July, 1864-September, 1864)
	Turchin, John Basil (b. Turchaninov, Ivan Vasilyevich)	Brigadier general, USV (July 17, 1862)		Resigned October 4, 1864; Only general officer on either side from Russia
	Turner, John Wesley	Colonel, USA; Brigadier general, USV (September 7, 1863)	Major general, USA (March 13, 1865); Major general, USV (1864)	USMA, 1855
	Tuttle, James Madison	Brigadier general, USV (June 9, 1862)		Resigned June 14, 1864
	Tyler, Daniel	Brigadier general, USV (March 13, 1862)		Resigned April 6, 1864; Uncle of Robert Ogden Tyler
	Tyler, Erastus B.	Brigadier general, USV (May 14, 1862)	Major general, USV (March 13, 1865)	
	Tyler, Robert Ogden	Major, USA; Brigadier general, USV (November 29, 1862)	Major general, USV (1864); Major general, USA (March 13, 1865)	USMA, 1853; Nephew of Daniel Tyler
	Tyndale, Hector (b. Tyndale, George Hector)	Brigadier general, USV (April 9, 1863)	Major general, USV (March 13, 1865)	Resigned August 26, 1864

=== U ===
Image	Name	Substantive Rank	Brevet Rank	Notes
	Ullmann, Daniel	Brigadier general, USV (January 13, 1863)	Major general, USV (March 13, 1865)	
	Underwood, Adin Ballou	Brigadier general, USV (November 6, 1863)	Major general, USV (August, 1865)	
	Upton, Emory	Captain, USA; Brigadier general, USV (May 12, 1864)	Major general, USA; Major general, USV	USMA, 1861; Superintendent, USMA (1870–1875); One of only two general officers ever promoted on the field by General Grant

=== V ===
Image	Name	Substantive Rank	Brevet Rank	Notes
	Van Alen, James Henry	Brigadier general, USV (April 15, 1862)		Resigned July 14, 1863
	Van Cleve, Horatio Phillips	Brigadier general, USV (March 21, 1862)	Major general, USV (March 13, 1865)	USMA, 1831
	Van Derveer, Ferdinand	Brigadier general, USV (October 4, 1864)		Resigned June 7, 1865
	Van Vliet, Stewart	Major, USA (August, 1861); Brigadier general, USV (March 13, 1865)	Brigadier general, USA (October, 1864); Major general, USV (March 13, 1865)	USMA, 1840; Earlier appointment as brigadier general, USV (September 23, 1861) expired July 17, 1862
	Van Wyck, Charles H.	Brigadier general, USV (September 27, 1865)		U.S. Congressman from New York (1859–1863, 1867–1871); U.S. Senator from Nebraska (1881–1887)
	Vandever, William	Brigadier General (November 29, 1862)	Major general, USV (June, 1865)	U.S. Congressman from Iowa (1859–1861); U.S. Congressman from California (1887–1891)
	Veatch, James C.	Brigadier general, USV (April 28, 1862)	Major general, USV (1865)	
	Viele, Egbert Ludovicus	Brigadier general, USV (August 17, 1861)		USMA, 1847; Resigned October 23., 1863; U.S. Congressman from New York (1885–1887)
	Vincent, Strong	Brigadier general, USV (July 3, 1863)		DOW, Battle of Gettysburg (July 2, 1863, d. July 7, 1863)
	Vinton, Francis Laurens	Captain, USA (October, 1861); Brigadier general, USV (March 13, 1863)		USMA, 1856; Earlier appointment as brigadier general, USV (September 19, 1862) expired March 4, 1863; Resigned May 5, 1863
	Vogdes, Israel	Colonel, USA (1863); Brigadier general, USV (November 29, 1862)	Brigadier general, USA	USMA, 1837
	Von Steinwehr, Adolph Wilhelm August Friedrich, Baron	Brigadier general, USV (October 12, 1861)	Eicher lists as "Steinwehr"	Resigned July 3, 1865

=== W ===
Image	Name	Substantive Rank	Brevet Rank	Notes
	Wade, Melancthon Smith	Brigadier general, USV (October 1, 1861)		Not confirmed, nomination rejected March 13, 1862; Warner includes as "mustered in" Eicher mentions nomination rejection Resigned March 18, 1862
	Wadsworth, James Samuel	Brigadier general, USV (August 9, 1861)	Major general, USV (May 6, 1864)	Full promotion to Major general, USV (May 5, 1864) posthumously revoked, brevet substituted DOW, Battle of the Wilderness (w. May 6, 1864, d. May 8, 1864)
	Wagner, George Day	Brigadier general, USV (November 29, 1862)		Relieved of duty at his own request, December 4, 1864; Mustered out August 24, 1865
	Walcutt, Charles C.	Brigadier general, USV (June 30, 1864)	Major general, USV (March 13, 1865)	
	Wallace, Lewis "Lew"	Major general, USV (March 21, 1862)		Commissioner on Lincoln assassination trial Territorial Governor of New Mexico (1878–1881); U.S. minister to the Ottoman Empire (1881–1885)
	Wallace, William Harvey Lamme	Brigadier general, USV (March 21, 1862)		DOW, Battle of Shiloh (w. April 7, 1862, d. April 10, 1862)
	Ward, John Henry Hobart	Brigadier general, USV (October 4, 1862)		Relieved May 12, 1864; Mustered out June 18, 1864
	Ward, William Thomas	Brigadier general, USV (September 18, 1861)	Major general, USV (February 24, 1865)	U.S. Congressman from Kentucky (1851–1853)
	Warner, James Meech	Captain, USA (October 8, 1864); Brigadier general, USV (May 8, 1865)	Brigadier general, USA (March 13, 1865)	USMA, 1860
	Warren, Fitz Henry	Brigadier general, USV (July 16, 1862)	Major general, USV (August 24, 1865)	U.S. minister to Guatemala (1866–1869)
	Warren, Gouverneur Kemble	Major, USA; Major general, USV (May 3, 1863)		USMA, 1850; Resigned volunteer commission May 27, 1865
	Washburn, Cadwallader Colden	Major general, USV (November 29, 1862)		U.S. Congressman from Wisconsin (1855–1861, 1867–1871); Governor of Wisconsin (1871–1873); Brother of Illinois Congressman Elihu Benjamin Washburne
	Washburn, Francis	Colonel, USV	Brigadier general, USV (April 6, 1865)	DOW, Battle of High Bridge (w. April 6, 1865, d. April 22, 1865)
	Watkins, Louis Douglass	Captain, USA (July, 1862); Brigadier general, USV (September 25, 1865)		Son-in-law of Lovell Harrison Rousseau
	Webb, Alexander Stewart	Brigadier general, USV (June 23, 1863)	Major general, USA (March 13, 1865); Major general, USV (August 1, 1864)	MOH, Battle of Gettysburg (July 3, 1863); USMA, 1855
	Weber, Max (aka Von Weber, Max)	Brigadier general, USV (April 28, 1862)		Resigned May 13, 1865
	Webster, Joseph Dana	Major, USA (July 1, 1861); Brigadier general, USV (November 29, 1862)	Major general, USV (March 13, 1865)	
	Weed, Stephen Hinsdale	Captain, USA (May 14, 1861); Brigadier general, USV (June 6, 1863)		USMA, 1854; KIA, Battle of Gettysburg appointed, not confirmed Warner lists, Eicher lists as "might have been"
	Weitzel, Godfrey	Captain, USA; Major general, USV (November 17, 1864)		USMA, 1855
	Wells, William	Brigadier general, USV (May 19, 1865)	Major general, USV (March 13, 1865)	
	Welsh, Thomas	Brigadier general, USV (March 13, 1863)		Original appointment as brigadier general, USV (November 29, 1862) expired March 4, 1863; Died of malaria, August 14, 1863
	Wessells, Henry Walton	Colonel, USA (1865); Brigadier general, USV (April 25, 1862)	Brigadier general, USA	USMA, 1833
	West, Joseph Rodman	Brigadier general, USV (October 25, 1862)	Major general, USV (January 4, 1866)	U.S. Senator from Louisiana (1871–1877)
	Wheaton, Frank	First Lieutenant, USA (1855); Brigadier general, USV (November 29, 1862)	Major general, USA; Major general, USV	Son-in-law of Adjutant General Samuel Cooper, CSA
	Whipple, Amiel Weeks	Major general, USV (May 3, 1863)	Major general, USA (May 7, 1863)	USMA, 1841; DOW, Battle of Chancellorsville (w. May 4, 1863, d. May 7, 1863)
	Whipple, William Denison	Colonel, USA; Brigadier general, USV (July 17, 1863)	Major general, USA	USMA, 1851
	Whitaker, Walter Chiles	Brigadier general, USV (June 25, 1863)	Major general, USV (March 13, 1865)	
	White, Julius	Brigadier general, USV (June 9, 1862)	Major general, USV (March 13, 1865)	Resigned November 19, 1864
	Wild, Edward Augustus	Brigadier general, USV (April 24, 1863)		
	Willcox, Orlando Bolivar	Brigadier general, USV (July 21, 1861)	Major general, USA; Major general, USV	MOH First Battle of Bull Run (July 21, 1861); USMA, 1847
	Williams, Alpheus Starkey	Brigadier general, USV (May 17, 1861)	Major general, USV (January 12, 1866)	U.S. Congressman from Michigan (1875–1879)
	Williams, David Henry	Brigadier general, USV (November 29, 1862)		Not confirmed, appointment expired March 4, 1863
	Williams, Nelson Grosvenor	Brigadier general, USV (November 29, 1862)		USMA (class of 1843), withdrew July, 1840; Resigned November 27, 1862; Appointment after resignation "Negated" by U.S. Senate March 9, 1863
	Williams, Seth	Lieutenant colonel, USA (July 7, 1862); Brigadier general, USV (September 23, 1861)	Brigadier general, USA (March 13, 1865); Major general, USV (March 13, 1865)	USMA, 1842
	Williams, Thomas	Major, USA (May 14, 1861); Brigadier general, USV (September 28, 1861)		USMA, 1837; KIA, Battle of Baton Rouge (August 5, 1862)
	Williamson, James Alexander	Brigadier general, USV (January 13, 1865)	Major general, USV (March 13, 1865)	MOH, Battle of Chickasaw Bayou (December 29, 1862)
	Willich, August (b. Von Willich, August)	Brigadier general, USV (July 17, 1862)	Major general, USV (October 21, 1865)	
	Wilson, James Harrison	First Lieutenant, USA (1861); Major general, USV (May 6, 1865)	Major general, USA	USMA, 1860
	Wistar, Isaac Jones	Brigadier general, USV (November 29, 1862)		Resigned September 15, 1864
	Wood, Thomas John	Colonel, USA (1861); Major general, USV (January 27, 1865)		USMA, 1845
	Woodbury, Daniel Phineas	Lieutenant colonel, USA (1861); Brigadier general, USV (March 19, 1862)	Major general, USA (August 15, 1864)	USMA, 1836; Died of yellow fever (August 15, 1864)
	Woods, Charles Robert	Captain (April 1, 1861); Brigadier general, USV (August 4, 1863)	Major general, USA (March 13, 1865); Major general, USV (November 22, 1864)	USMA, 1852; Brother of William Burnham Woods; Brother-in-law of Willard Warner
	Woods, William Burnham	Brigadier general, USV (May 31, 1865)	Major general, USV (March 13, 1865)	Associate Justice of the Supreme Court (1880–1887); Brother of Charles Robert Woods; Brother-in-law of Willard Warner
	Wool, John Ellis	Major general, USA (May 16, 1862)		Retired August 1, 1863; Oldest Civil War general in active service (b. February 29, 1784)
	Wright, George	Colonel, USA (1855); Brigadier general, USV (September 28, 1861)		USMA, 1822; Died in the wreck of the steamer Brother Jonathan (June 30, 1865)
	Wright, Horatio Gouverneur	Major, USA (August, 1861); Major general, USV (May 12, 1864)	Major general, USA (March 13, 1865)	USMA, 1841; Original appointment as major general, USV (July 18, 1862) expired March 4, 1863

=== Y ===
Image	Name	Substantive Rank	Brevet Rank	Notes

=== Z ===
Image	Name	Substantive Rank	Brevet Rank	Notes
	Zook, Samuel Kosciuszko	Brigadier general, USV (November 29, 1862)	Major general, USV (July 3, 1863)	DOW, Battle of Gettysburg (July 2, 1863, d. July 3, 1863)

== See also ==
- List of American Civil War brevet generals (Union)
- List of American Civil War generals (Confederate)
- List of American Civil War generals (Acting Confederate)
- General officers in the Confederate States Army
- General officers in the United States
- Bibliography of Ulysses S. Grant
- Bibliography of the American Civil War
