= General Rice =

General Rice may refer to:

- Americus V. Rice (1835–1904), Union Army brigadier general
- Charles Rice (general) (1787–1863), Massachusetts Militia brigadier general
- Desmond Rice (1924–2020), British Army major general
- Edward A. Rice Jr. (born 1956), U.S. Air Force four-star general
- Elliott Warren Rice (1835–1887), Union Army brigadier general and brevet major general
- James Clay Rice (1828–1864), Union Army brigadier general
- L. Scott Rice (born 1958), U.S. Air Force lieutenant general
- Samuel Allen Rice (1828–1864), Union Army brigadier general
- Spring R. Rice (1858–1929), British Army major general

== See also ==
- Attorney General Rice (disambiguation)
