= Attorney General Rice =

Attorney General Rice may refer to:

- Milton P. Rice (1920–2018), Attorney General of Tennessee
- Samuel Allen Rice (1828–1864), Attorney General of Iowa

== See also ==
- General Rice (disambiguation)
