= Lewis Cass (disambiguation) =

Lewis Cass (1782–1866), was an American military officer, politician, and statesman

Lewis Cass may also refer to:

== People ==
- Lewis Cass Jr. (1814–1878), American diplomat, and son of the politician
- Lewis Cass Hunt (1824–1886), American army general
- Lewis Cass Ledyard (1852–1932), American lawyer
- Lewis Cass (footballer) (born 2000), English footballer

== Places ==
- Lewis Cass High School, high school in Walton, Indiana
- Lewis Cass Tech, public high school in Midtown Detroit, Michigan
- Lewis Cass Building, former name of Elliott-Larsen Building, state government building in Lansing Michigan

== Other ==
- Lewis Cass expedition, 1820 survey of Michigan territory
