= 3rd Michigan Infantry Regiment =

- Michigan state flag
- Active: May 21, 1861, to June 10, 1864
- Country: United States
- Allegiance: Union
- Branch: Infantry
- Size: 1,238
- Engagements: First Battle of Bull Run; Peninsular Campaign; Second Battle of Bull Run; Battle of Chantilly; Battle of Fredericksburg; Battle of Chancellorsville; Battle of Gettysburg; Battle of the Wilderness; Battle of Cold Harbor

Commanders
- Notable commanders: Colonel Daniel McConnell; Colonel Stephen Gardner Champlin; Colonel Byron Root Pierce

The 3rd Michigan Infantry Regiment was an infantry regiment that served in the Union Army during the American Civil War.

== Service ==
The regiment was mustered into service at June 10, 1861 at Grand Rapids, Michigan.

The regiment was mustered out of service on June 10, 1864. For veterans and recruits who re-enlisted were transferred to the 5th Michigan Volunteer Infantry.

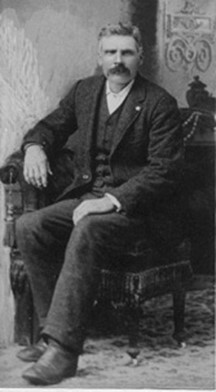
Private Michael Kane, 3rd Michigan Infantry, wounded at the Battle of Cold Harbor, 1864.

== Commanders ==
- Colonel Daniel McConnell
- Colonel Stephen Gardner Champlin
- Colonel Byron Root Pierce

== See also ==
- 3rd Michigan Volunteer Infantry Regiment (reorganized)
- List of Michigan Civil War Units
- Michigan in the American Civil War
