= Stephen Gardner Champlin =

American physician, lawyer, soldier, and judge

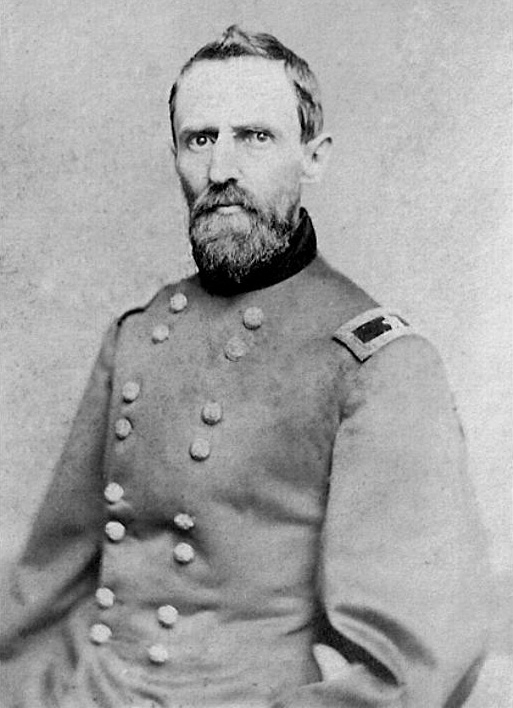
- Stephen Gardner Champlin
- Born: July 1, 1827; Kingston, New York
- Died: January 24, 1864 (aged 36); Grand Rapids, Michigan
- Burial place: Fulton Street Cemetery, Grand Rapids, Michigan
- Military career
- Allegiance: United States of America; Union
- Branch: United States Army; Union Army
- Service years: 1861–1863
- Rank: Brigadier General
- Commands: 3rd Michigan Infantry Regiment
- Conflicts: American Civil War

Stephen Gardner Champlin (July 1, 1827 – January 24, 1864) was an American medical doctor, lawyer, soldier, and judge. He served in the Union Army during the American Civil War, rising to the rank of brigadier general before succumbing to wounds he received in combat.

== Early life ==
Champlin was born in Kingston, New York, a son of Jeffrey Clarke Champlin (1798–1872) and his wife Allis Ellen (1804–1873). He received his initial education at local public schools, and then he attended the academy at Rhinebeck in Dutchess County for a single term.

In 1842 Champlin began studying medicine at Harpersfield in Delaware County. By 1845 he had a medical practice located at Wawarsing in Ulster County.

Champlin decided in 1848 to give up working as a medical doctor, and by 1849 he was studying to become a lawyer. He attended State and National Law School for two terms, and in 1850 he continued his studies with Theodoric R. Westbrook in Kingston. He was admitted to the bar later in 1850, and commenced practice in Albany, New York.

On January 1, 1851, Champlin married Mary E. Smedes in Wawarsing. They had one child, a son named Alexander. In 1853 the Champlins moved to Grand Rapids, Michigan. Champlin practiced law in partnership with Lucius Patterson. In 1856 he was elected judge of the Recorder's Court, and served two years.

He was active in the Michigan state militia. On April 22, 1856 he was elected captain of the Grand Rapids Light Artillery ("Ringgolds" Light Artillery). During 1857 he began a new law partnership, this time with Harry Yale. In February 1858 Champlin was elected a major of the militia's Grand River Battalion. That fall he was elected the Prosecuting Attorney for Kent County.

== Civil War service ==
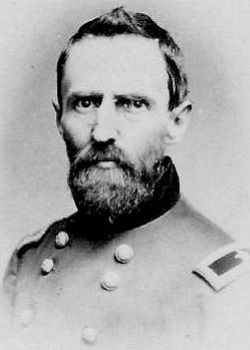
Champlin during the American Civil War

When the American Civil War began in 1861, Champlin chose to follow the Union cause. On June 10 he entered the Union Army as a Major in the 3rd Michigan Infantry. This regiment was organized at Grand Rapids to serve three years, and left the city on June 13. Camplin was in command of a reconnaissance on August 30 near Bailey's Corners in Virginia. Afterwards he was highly praised for his performance in this minor action by the Union Army of the Potomac's commander, Maj. Gen. George B. McClellan. On September 5, McClellan sent the 3rd Michigan an aide with the following message: "The general is much pleased with Major Champlin's dispositions on the occasion, which he deems eminently proper, and he desires you to convey his thanks to Major Champlin for the efficient manner in which this service was performed." That fall Champlin was appointed commander of the 3rd Michigan, with the rank of colonel as of October 28.

Champlin participated during the 1862 Peninsula Campaign, and was wounded in his hip at the Battle of Seven Pines on May 31. Subsequently he was granted a 30-day leave to mend. Champlin was commended for his actions during the battle by divisional commander Maj. Gen. Philip Kearny, shortly before the latter's own death in combat.

Partially recovered, Champlin led his regiment during the Second Battle of Bull Run on August 28–30, and was again injured during the battle's last day, re-opening his wound he received in May. During this second leave for recuperation, Champlin was promoted to brigadier general in the Union Army, to rank from November 29, 1862. While resting in Washington, D.C., he wrote to Michigan Governor Austin Blair on January 3, 1863, formally resigning his command of the 3rd due to his promotion.

In 1863 Champlin was appointed to command of the Draft Depot at Camp Cleveland, Ohio. However this order was revoked in late August, most likely due to his health condition. Instead, Champlin was assigned to the command of the Draft Depot near his home in Grand Rapids on September 22. Champlin's hip wound still bothered him, and he reportedly resigned his commission in the Union Army on November 8, 1863.

Champlin died in early 1864 at his home due to his wounds. His funeral was conducted at St. Mark's Church in Grand Rapids on January 28, and he was buried there in Fulton Street Cemetery. In his honor, Grand Army of the Republic Post #29 in Grand Rapids was named for him.

== See also ==
- List of American Civil War generals (Union)
