= David C. Cloud =

American politician (1817–1903)

Member of the Iowa House of Representatives from the 25th district
- In office December 1, 1856 – January 10, 1858

1st Attorney General of Iowa
- In office 1853–1856
- Preceded by: District created
- Succeeded by: Samuel Allen Rice

Personal details
- Born: David Caesar Cloud; January 29, 1817 Champaign County, Ohio, U.S.
- Died: July 10, 1903 (aged 86) Chicago, Illinois, U.S.
- Party: Democratic
- Profession: Politician, writer, lawyer

David Caesar Cloud (January 29, 1817 – July 10, 1903) was an American politician, writer, and lawyer who served as the first Attorney General of Iowa from 1853 to 1856. He subsequently served in the Iowa House of Representatives, representing the 25th legislative district of Iowa from 1856 to 1858.

== Early life and education ==
Cloud was born in Champaign County, Ohio on January 29, 1817. He moved to Muscatine in Iowa Territory in 1839.

Cloud was a carpenter and studied law.

== Career ==
Cloud was admitted to the Iowa bar in 1846. In 1851, he was elected county attorney for Muscatine County, Iowa.

Cloud served as the first Attorney General of Iowa from 1853 to 1856 as a member of the Democratic Party. He subsequently served in the Iowa House of Representatives from 1856 to 1858 and continued to practice law.

== Personal life and death ==
Cloud supported President Abraham Lincoln and the Republican Party due to the party's opposition to slavery. He wrote several books on monopolies and the war powers of the president of the United States.

At the 1872 Democratic National Convention, Cloud supported Horace Greeley for the presidency.

Cloud moved to Chicago, Illinois due to his age and health, where he died at the age of 86 on July 10, 1903.

Political offices
Preceded by Office created	Attorney General of Iowa; 1853–1856	Succeeded by Samuel Allen Rice
Iowa House of Representatives
Preceded by —	Member of the Iowa House of Representatives from the 25th district 1856–1858	Succeeded by —
