= 92nd New York Infantry Regiment =

- Active: September 18, 1861 - January 7, 1865
- Country: United States
- Allegiance: Union
- Branch: Infantry
- Nicknames: 2nd St. Lawrence County Regiment, New York Excelsior Rifle Legion, Excelsior Rifle Blues, and Potsdam Regiment
- Engagements: Siege of Yorktown; Battle of Williamsburg; Battle of Seven Pines; Seven Days Battles; Battle of Garnett's & Golding's Farm; Battle of White Oak Swamp; Battle of Malvern Hill; Battle of Kinston; Battle of Goldsborough Bridge; Bermuda Hundred Campaign; Battle of Cold Harbor; Siege of Petersburg; Battle of Chaffin's Farm; Battle of Fair Oaks & Darbytown Road

The 92nd New York Infantry Regiment (a.k.a. "2nd St. Lawrence County Regiment", "New York Excelsior Rifle Legion", "Excelsior Rifle Blues", and "Potsdam Regiment") was an infantry regiment in the Union Army during the American Civil War.

== Service ==
The 92nd New York Infantry was organized at Potsdam, New York beginning September 18, 1861, and mustered on January 1, 1862 for three-years service under the command of Colonel Jonah Sanford.

The regiment was attached to 3rd Brigade, 3rd Division, IV Corps, Army of the Potomac, to June 1862. 2nd Brigade, 2nd Division, IV Corps, to September 1862. Wessell's Brigade, Division of Suffolk, Virginia, VII Corps, Department of Virginia, to December 1862. 1st Brigade, 1st Division, Department of North Carolina, to January 1863. 1st Brigade, 4th Division, XVIII Corps, Department of North Carolina, to May 1863. Lee's Brigade, Defenses of New Bern, North Carolina, Department of North Carolina, to August 1863. Sub-District of the Albemarle District of North Carolina, Department of Virginia and North Carolina, to April 1864. Palmer's Brigade, Peck's Division, XVIII Corps, April 1864. 3rd Brigade, 1st Division, XVIII Corps, to October 1864. 2nd Brigade, 1st Division, XVIII Corps, to December 1864.

Veterans and new recruits were consolidated with 96th New York Volunteer Infantry on December 1, 1864. The 92nd New York Infantry mustered out of service on January 7, 1865.

== Detailed service ==
Left New York for Washington, D.C., March 5, 1862. Advance on Manassas, Va., March 10–15, 1862. Ordered to the Peninsula, Virginia, March 28. Siege of Yorktown April 5-May 4. Reconnaissance toward Lee's Mills April 29. Battle of Williamsburg May 5. Operations about Bottom's Bridge May 21–23. Near Seven Pines May 29–30. Battle of Seven Pines or Fair Oaks May 31-June 1. New Market Road June 8. Seven days before Richmond June 25-July 1. Bottom's Bridge June 27–28. White Oak Swamp June 30. Malvern Hill July 1. At Harrison's Landing until August 16. Moved to Fort Monroe August 16–23. Duty there until September 18. Moved to Suffolk, Va., September 18, and duty there until December. Reconnaissance to Franklin October 3. Affairs on the Blackwater October 9, 26, 29, and 30. Franklin October 31. Ordered to New Bern, N.C., December 4. Foster's Expedition to Goldsborough, NC, December 11–20. Actions at Kinston December 14, Whitehall December 16, Goldsborough December 17. Duty at and near New Bern until April 1864. Operations against Whiting January 18-February 10. Fort Anderson March 14, 1863. Expedition to relief of Little Washington April 7–10. Beech Grove and Batchelor's Creek, near New Bern, February 1–3, 1864. Ordered to Yorktown, Va., April 28, 1864. Butler's operations on the south side of the James River and against Petersburg and Richmond May 4–28. Occupation of City Point and Bermuda Hundred May 5. Swift Creek or Arrowfield Church May 8–10. Operations against Fort Darling May 12–16. Battle of Drury's Bluff May 14–16. Bermuda Hundred May 16–27. Moved to White House, then to Cold Harbor, May 27–31. Battle of Cold Harbor June 1–12. Before Petersburg June 15–18. Wier Bottom Church June 20. Siege operations against Petersburg and Richmond June 16 to December 1, 1864. Hare's House June 24 and 28. Mine Explosion, Petersburg, July 30 (reserve). Duty in the trenches before Petersburg and on the Bermuda Hundred front until September 26. Battle of Chaffin's Farm, New Market Heights. September 28–30. Battle of Fair Oaks October 27–28. Duty in the trenches before Richmond north of the James River until December.

== Casualties ==
The regiment lost a total of 185 men during service; 1 officer and 67 enlisted men killed or mortally wounded, 2 officers and 115 enlisted men died of disease.

== Commanders ==
- Colonel Jonah Sanford
- Colonel Lewis Cass Hunt
- Colonel Thomas S. Hall

== See also ==
- List of New York Civil War regiments
- New York in the Civil War
