= 3rd Michigan Infantry Regiment (reorganized) =

- Michigan state flag
- Active: August 24, 1864, to June 10, 1865
- Country: United States
- Allegiance: Union
- Branch: Infantry

The 3rd Michigan Infantry regiment (reorganized) was an infantry regiment that served in the Union Army during the American Civil War.

== Service ==
The 3rd Michigan Infantry was organized at Adrian, Pontiac, and Grand Rapids, Michigan, and mustered into federal service between August 24, 1864, and October 12, 1864. The new regiment assumed the number of the original 3rd Michigan that had been discharged at the completion of their enlistment on June 10, 1864.

The regiment was mustered out on June 10, 1865.

== Total strength and casualties ==
The regiment suffered 1 enlisted man who were killed in action or mortally wounded and 1 officers and 163 enlisted men who died of disease, for a total of 165 fatalities.

== Commanders ==
- Colonel Moses Barrett Houghton

== See also ==
- 3rd Michigan Volunteer Infantry Regiment
- List of Michigan Civil War Units
- Michigan in the American Civil War
