= Lewis Cass Hunt =

American general

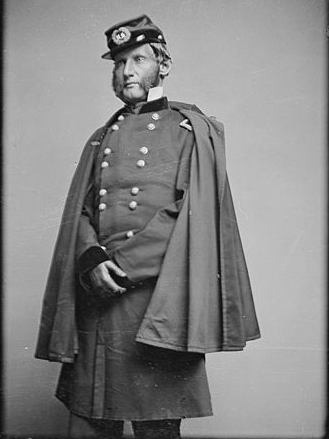
- Born: 23 February 1824; Green Bay, Wisconsin, U.S.
- Died: 6 September 1886 (aged 62); Fort Union, New Mexico Territory
- Burial place: Fort Leavenworth National Cemetery
- Military career
- Allegiance: United States of America: Union
- Branch: United States Army: Union Army
- Rank: Brigadier General
- Units: 4th U.S. Infantry Regiment; 20th U.S. Infantry Regiment
- Commands: 92nd New York Infantry Regiment; 14th U.S. Infantry Regiment
- Conflicts: Pig War; American Civil War; Battle of Seven Pines; Battle of Kinston

Lewis Cass Hunt (February 23, 1824 – September 6, 1886) was a United States Army officer who served as a general in the American Civil War.

== Early life ==
Hunt was born on 23 February 1824 at Fort Howard in Green Bay, Michigan Territory. He was the son of Samuel Wellington Hunt, his brother being fellow general Henry Jackson Hunt. He entered the United States Military Academy in 1843 and graduated in 1847, ranking 33rd out of 38. Serving in the 4th U.S. Infantry Regiment; after being promoted to captain Hunt served as the commander of the U.S. force on San Juan Island in 1859. Hunt was relieved from duty on San Juan Island in April 1860 by George Pickett.

== Civil War ==
When the civil war began Hunt accepted a commission in the United States Volunteers and became Colonel of the 92nd New York Infantry Regiment. With his regiment he participated in the Peninsula Campaign in 1862 and was wounded during the Battle of Seven Pines. While recovering in North Carolina, on 29 November 1862, he was made a Brigadier General in the volunteers. In this position he served in the attack against Kingston. Hunt received a brevet promotion to Lieutenant Colonel in the regular army for his actions at Kingston. He then led various brigades of the XVIII Corps down in the Carolinas, became Major of the 14th U.S. Infantry Regiment and in mid-1863 transferred back north. He commanded a draft depot in Connecticut until early 1864 and then served in New York for the rest of the war. Hunt received the rank of Brevet Brigadier General in the Regular Army for meritorious service during the war with rank from 13 March 1865 and was then mustered out on 1 September 1865.

== Later life ==
After the Civil War, Hunt served at multiple military installations including Fort Wayne, Indiana and Fort Totten, North Dakota. During this period he was promoted to Lieutenant Colonel in the army as well as Colonel in the 14th Infantry in 1881. Due to a history of dysentery, Hunt was sent to Fort Union, New Mexico, in August 1886 for health problems. He died there on 6 September 1886 of dysentery. He is buried at the National Cemetery in Fort Leavenworth, Kansas.

== See also ==
- List of American Civil War generals (Union)
