= Byron Root Pierce =

Union Army officer of the American Civil War

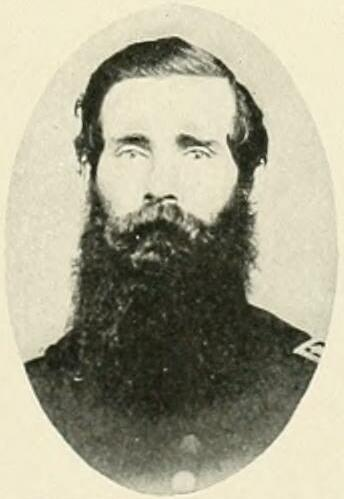
- Born: September 20, 1829; East Bloomfield, Ontario County, New York, United States
- Died: July 10, 1924 (aged 94)
- Buried: Fulton Street Cemetery, Grand Rapids, Michigan, United States
- Allegiance: United States of America: Union
- Branch: Union Army
- Service years: 1861–1865
- Rank: Brigadier General; Brevet Major General
- Conflicts: American Civil War: First Battle of Manassas; Peninsula Campaign; Seven Days Battles; Battle of Gettysburg; Battle of Chancellorsville; Overland Campaign; Appomattox Campaign (Battle of Sailor's Creek)

Byron Root Pierce (September 20, 1829 – July 10, 1924) was an American dentist who served as a Union Army general in the American Civil War. He was noted for fighting at First Manassas and during the Peninsula and Seven Days Campaigns. Pierce participated in all of the major battles in the East.

== Biography ==
Pierce was born on September 20, 1829, in East Bloomfield, Ontario County, New York. His parents were Silas and Mary Pierce. He came from a family of soldiers. His grandfather, Thaddeus Root, was a veteran of the American Revolutionary War. He was also the great grandson of Aaron Root, a Lieutenant Colonel of the First Berkshire County Regiment of the Massachusetts militia.

Pierce studied at an academy in Rochester, New York, and worked for his father's milling business. He obtained a degree in dentistry and in 1856 he relocated to Grand Rapids, Michigan, where he practiced his profession.

On October 12, 1881, Pierce married Abbie L. Evans of Rhode Island.

== Civil War ==
When the American Civil War began Pierce was captain of a militia company, the Valley City Lights Guard, before entering Federal service in June 1861 and was appointed captain He then served as a company commander in the 3rd Michigan Infantry Regiment at the Battle of First Manassas. Pierce continued to serve as part of the Army of the Potomac during the Peninsula and Seven Days campaigns, rising the ranks. He also saw action at Groveton, Chantilly and Fredericksburg, commanding the regiment in the latter. Afterwards he was promoted to Colonel and then fought at Chancellorsville, where he was wounded and received a commendation for his command.

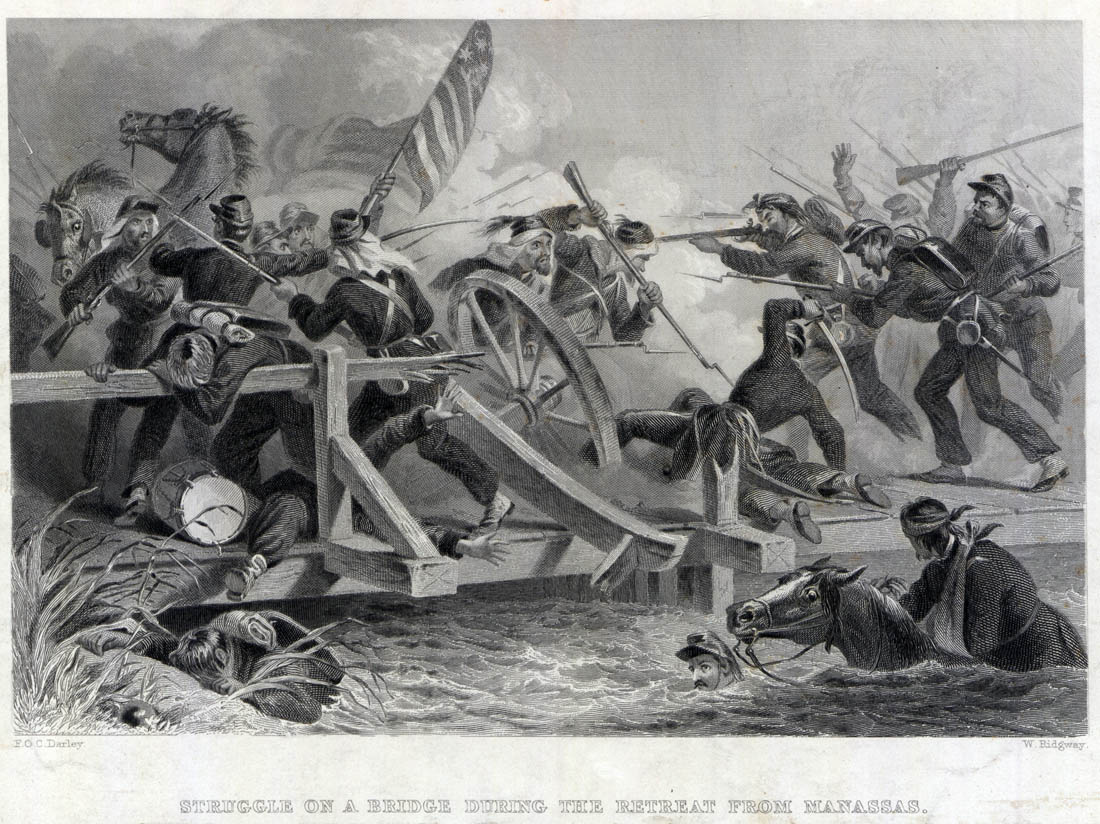
First Manassas

Pierce's regiment also fought Confederate forces, led by Joseph B. Kershaw, in the defense of the Peach Orchard during the second day of the Battle of Gettysburg. There he was wounded and his brother, Lieutenant Colonel Edwin Pierce, took over. Some sources said his leg required amputation. However, this was wound was addressed by the regimental surgeon and did not require hospitalization. He took part in the Bristoe and Mine Run campaigns, among other operations conducted in Virginia. He commanded the 3rd Michigan Infantry Regiment in the Battle of the Wilderness, the first battle of the Overland Campaign.During the final years of the war he commanded various brigades in the II Corps. He was promoted to brigadier general of U.S. Volunteers on June 7, 1864. After the Battle of Sailor's Creek, on April 6, 1865, he was brevetted to major general.

Overall, Pierce was wounded five times during the war and was present in all of the major battles in the East from First Bull Run to Appomattox. After the war he was active in veteran affairs, serving as the Grand Army of the Republic's commander of the Department of Michigan for two years. After retirement, Pierce was employed by the U.S. post office at Grand Rapids where he lived after the war. He was Michigan's last living Civil War general.

Pierce died in 1924 and was buried in Fulton Street Cemetery in Michigan.
