= Elliott Warren Rice =

American lawyer

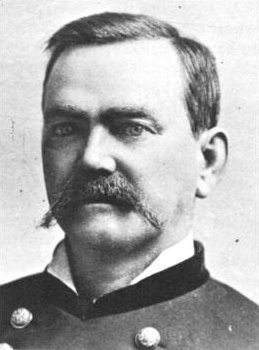
- Born: November 16, 1835; Allegheny, Pennsylvania, US
- Died: June 22, 1887 (aged 51); Sioux City, Iowa, US
- Burial place: Floyd Cemetery, Sioux City, Iowa
- Military career
- Allegiance: United States; Union
- Branch: United States Army; Union Army
- Service years: 1861–1865
- Rank: Brigadier General; Brevet Major General
- Units: XVI Corps; XV Corps
- Conflicts: American Civil War; *Second Battle of Corinth; *Battle of Belmont; *Fort Henry; *Fort Donelson; *Battle of Shiloh; *Atlanta campaign *Carolinas campaign

Elliott Warren Rice (November 16, 1835 – June 22, 1887) was a general in the Union Army during the American Civil War. He commanded an infantry brigade during the pivotal Atlanta campaign in the summer of 1864.

== Early life ==
Rice was born in Allegheny, Pennsylvania. His family moved to Belmont, Ohio, when Rice was an infant. He was schooled in Wheeling, West Virginia (then Virginia), and Franklin College in Athens, Ohio. In 1855, he moved to Oskaloosa, Iowa, to study law under his brother, Samuel Allen Rice, and graduated from the University of Albany Law School in 1858. He practiced law in Oskaloosa with Samuel until the Civil War broke out.

== Civil War ==
On July 24, 1861, he joined the 7th Iowa Volunteer Infantry Regiment as a corporal. He was promoted to major on August 30, 1861. He fought at the Battle of Belmont in November, and became regimental commander when his superiors became incapacitated. There he received the first of seven war wounds. He participated in the campaigns to capture Fort Henry and Fort Donelson and in the Battle of Shiloh, when he was promoted to colonel. He fought in the Second Battle of Corinth (October 1862) and commanded Bethel and La Grange, Tennessee, leading the 1st Brigade, 2nd Division, XVI Corps and protected Memphis & Charleston Railroad.

As a brigade commander in the Atlanta Campaign in 1864, he fought at Resaca, New Hope Church, and Kennesaw Mountain, Georgia. He was appointed and confirmed as brigadier general of volunteers on June 22, 1864, leading the 2nd Division. He participated in the Siege of Atlanta, and then transferred to the XV Corps, where he served through the March to the Sea and the Carolinas campaign. Rice was mustered out of the volunteers on August 24, 1865. On January 13, 1866, President Andrew Johnson nominated Rice for appointment as a brevet major general of volunteers for war service to rank from March 13, 1865 and the United States Senate confirmed the appointment on March 12, 1866.

== Post war ==
After the war he practiced law in Washington D.C., until returning to Iowa, to his sister's home in Sioux City, where he remained until his death. He is interred at Floyd Cemetery, Sioux City, Iowa.

== See also ==
- List of American Civil War generals (Union)
