= Samuel Allen Rice =

American politician

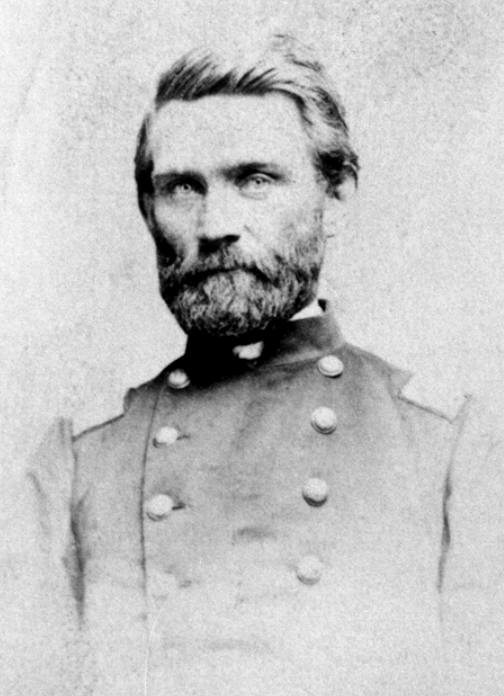

2nd Attorney General of Iowa
- In office 1856–1861
- Governor: James W. Grimes; Ralph P. Lowe
- Preceded by: David C. Cloud
- Succeeded by: Charles C. Nourse

Personal details
- Born: January 27, 1828 Cattaraugus, New York, U.S.
- Died: July 6, 1864 (aged 36) Oskaloosa, Iowa, U.S.
- Cause of death: Died of wounds received at the Battle of Jenkins' Ferry
- Resting place: Forest Cemetery, Oskaloosa, Iowa
- Party: Republican
- Spouse: Louisa Alexander (m. 1854–1864)
- Children: James Alexander Rice^{(b. 1855; died 1934)}; Frank S. Rice^{(b. 1860; died 1890)}
- Relatives: Elliott Warren Rice (brother)
- Education: Union College
- Profession: Lawyer

Military service
- Allegiance: United States
- Branch/service: United States Volunteers; Union Army
- Years of service: 1862–1864
- Rank: Brig. General, USV
- Commands: 33rd Reg. Ia. Vol. Infantry
- Battles/wars: American Civil War

Samuel Allen Rice (January 27, 1828 – July 6, 1864) was an American lawyer and Republican politician from Mahaska County, Iowa. He served as the 2nd attorney general of Iowa, from 1856 to 1861, and was the first Iowa attorney general elected on the Republican Party ticket. After leaving office, he volunteered for service in the Union Army; he served for two years and was promoted to the rank of brigadier general before being mortally wounded at the Battle of Jenkins' Ferry, in Arkansas. Rice County, Kansas, was named in his honor.

His brother, Elliott Warren Rice, was also a Union Army general.

== Biography ==
Samuel Allen Rice was born in Cattaraugus, New York. He attended Franklin College (New Athens, Ohio) in Ohio and then graduated from Union College at Schenectady, New York, in 1849. Then in 1851, he moved to Oskaloosa, Iowa in Mahaska County, where he practiced law, was county attorney, and then served as the second Attorney General of Iowa in 1856–1861 on behalf of the Republican Party.

In the American Civil War, he was a colonel in the 33rd Iowa Volunteer Infantry which was mustered into federal service on October 4, 1862, within Mahaska County. He fought to open the Yazoo River for navigation, and then he commanded the 2nd Brigade, 13th Division, XIII Corps at Helena, Arkansas. In August 1863, he was promoted to brigadier general. On April 30, 1864, at Jenkins' Ferry, Arkansas, he was mortally wounded and then was returned to his home state of Iowa. He died at Oskaloosa, Iowa, July 6, 1864, and was interred at Forest Cemetery in Oskaloosa.

Rice County, Kansas, was named in his honor. He was the older brother of Union general Elliott Warren Rice.

== See also ==
- List of Iowa Attorneys General

Legal offices
Preceded by David C. Cloud	Attorney General of Iowa; 1856–1861	Succeeded by Charles C. Nourse
