= William R. Brewster =

Former Union Army Officer (1828-1869)

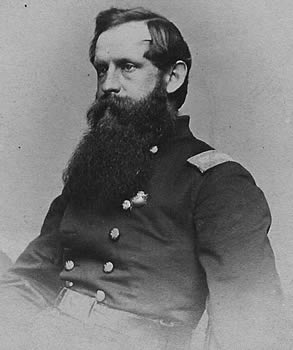
- Born: July 27, 1828; Goshen, Connecticut, U.S.
- Died: December 13, 1869 (aged 41); Brooklyn, New York, U.S.
- Military career
- Allegiance: United States (Union)
- Branch: Union Army
- Service years: 1861-1864
- Rank: Brevet brigadier general
- Unit: Army of the Potomac
- Commands: Excelsior Brigade, III Corps
- Conflicts: American Civil War; First Battle of Bull Run; Peninsula campaign; Battle of Fredericksburg; Battle of Gettysburg; Mine Run campaign; Overland Campaign; Battle of the Wilderness; Battle of Cold Harbor; Siege of Petersburg
- Other work: Businessman

William Root Brewster (July 27, 1828 – December 13, 1869) was an officer in the Union Army during the American Civil War who commanded a regiment in the famed Excelsior Brigade of the Army of the Potomac. He later commanded the brigade, including at the Battle of Gettysburg where Brewster and his men were overrun by Confederates while defending the Emmitsburg Road position of the III Corps not far from the Peach Orchard.

== Early life ==
William Root Brewster was born on July 27, 1828, in Goshen, Connecticut, the son of Nelson Brewster and Lucretta Hannah Root. He later moved to New York State, probably to Brooklyn.

== Civil War ==
When the war broke out, Brewster was commissioned as the major of the 28th New York State Militia at Brooklyn in the spring of 1861. He and his regiment were not engaged at the First Battle of Bull Run because it was on guard duty along the Potomac River.

Brewster returned to New York, where he became involved in the recruiting efforts of the controversial politician Daniel Sickles, which led to creation of the Excelsior Brigade. Brewster became colonel of the 73rd New York Infantry, Fourth Excelsior, on September 13, 1861. The recruits were mostly from the fire departments of the New York and Brooklyn area. The Excelsior regiments subsequently served in the Peninsula Campaign of Maj. Gen. George B. McClellan. The brigade served in the Second Division, III Corps. Brewster is reported to have been taken prisoner in this period, but the details are unknown. He was exchanged about August 15, 1862. Consequently, he was not present at the Second Battle of Bull Run.

Brewster was in command of his regiment at the Battle of Fredericksburg. He missed the Battle of Chancellorsville, likely because of illness. When he returned to the Army of the Potomac, Brewster found himself in command of the Excelsior Brigade in the division of Brig. Gen Andrew A. Humphreys. Brewster led the brigade during the Gettysburg campaign in June and July 1863. On July 2, the brigade was advanced to an area near the Peach Orchard. It was flanked out of that position by the Confederate division of Maj. Gen. Lafayette McLaws. Brewster's horse was shot out from under him in that action. The remains of the brigade took part in a counterattack late on July 2 that recaptured some abandoned Union guns. Brewster reported that his brigade lost 778 of 1,837 engaged.

Brewster again fell ill after the battle, and the brigade was led by Brig. Gen. Francis Barretto Spinola during the pursuit of the Confederate army into Virginia. (Spinola was wounded at the Battle of Manassas Gap on July 23, 1863. Col. J. Egbert Farnum commanded until Brewster returned to active duty.) Brewster was present for the autumn campaigns of 1863, and it is reported that he inspired his men by rising from his "sick bed" to lead the Excelsiors in the Mine Run Campaign.

When the Army of the Potomac was reorganized for the Overland Campaign of Lt. Gen. Ulysses S. Grant, Brewster retained brigade command. The brigade, augmented with two regiments, served in the Battle of the Wilderness in the Fourth Division, II Corps under Brig. Gen. Gershom Mott. When the remnants of the division became part of the Third Division of Maj. Gen. David B. Birney shortly before the Battle of Spotsylvania, Brewster's brigade became the division's Fourth Brigade. He led these men at the Battle of Cold Harbor and in the initial operations of the Siege of Petersburg until May 13, 1864. Then the brigade was abolished. Most of the Excelsiors were moved to the First Brigade, Third Division. When Brig. Gen. Régis de Trobriand joined II Corps during the siege, he took command of the First Brigade, with Brewster as the senior colonel. When de Trobriand was acting division commander October 8-October 21, 1864, Brewster led the brigade in his place.

Colonel Brewster was mustered out with the 73rd New York on October 24 near Petersburg, Virginia, and subsequently returned to New York. He was given the brevet rank of brigadier general on December 2, 1864.

== Postbellum activities and memorialization ==
Following his mustering out of the service, Brewster returned to Brooklyn and resumed his civilian life. He was active in early reunions of his former regiment.

William R. Brewster died in Brooklyn on December 13, 1869, at the age of 41. He was buried there at the Green-Wood Cemetery, a cemetery that also contains the remains of several other Civil War officers and generals.

A monument to the Excelsior Brigade stands in the field in which it deployed at Gettysburg, now known as the Excelsior Field. It was dedicated on July 2, 1893.
