= Excelsior Brigade =

Excelsior Brigade (2nd Brigade)
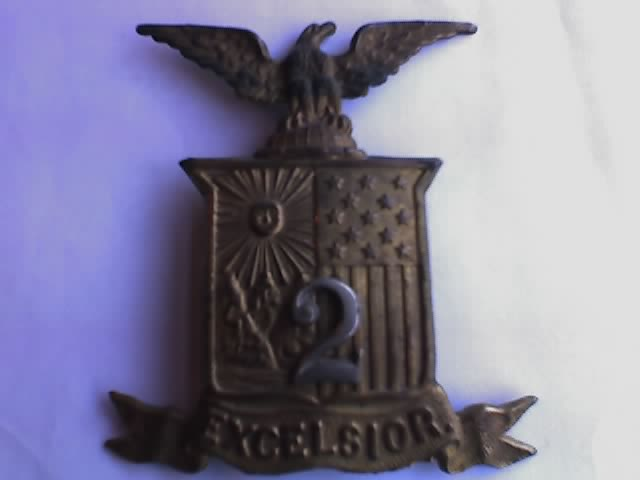
- The insignia of the Excelsior Brigade
- Active: 1861 – 1864
- Allegiance: Union Army
- Type: Brigade
- Size: 4 - 6 regiments
- Part of: Army of the Potomac: III Corps; 2nd Division
- Nickname: Excelsior Brigade
- Engagements: American Civil War: Battle of Fredericksburg; Battle of Chancellorsville; Gettysburg campaign

Commanders
- Notable commanders: Daniel E. Sickles; William R. Brewster

The Excelsior Brigade was a military unit in the Union Army during the American Civil War. Mainly composed of infantry regiments raised in the state of New York primarily by former U.S. Representative Daniel Sickles, the brigade served in several of the Army of the Potomac's most important battles in the Eastern Theater, including Chancellorsville and Gettysburg.

== Organization and early battles ==
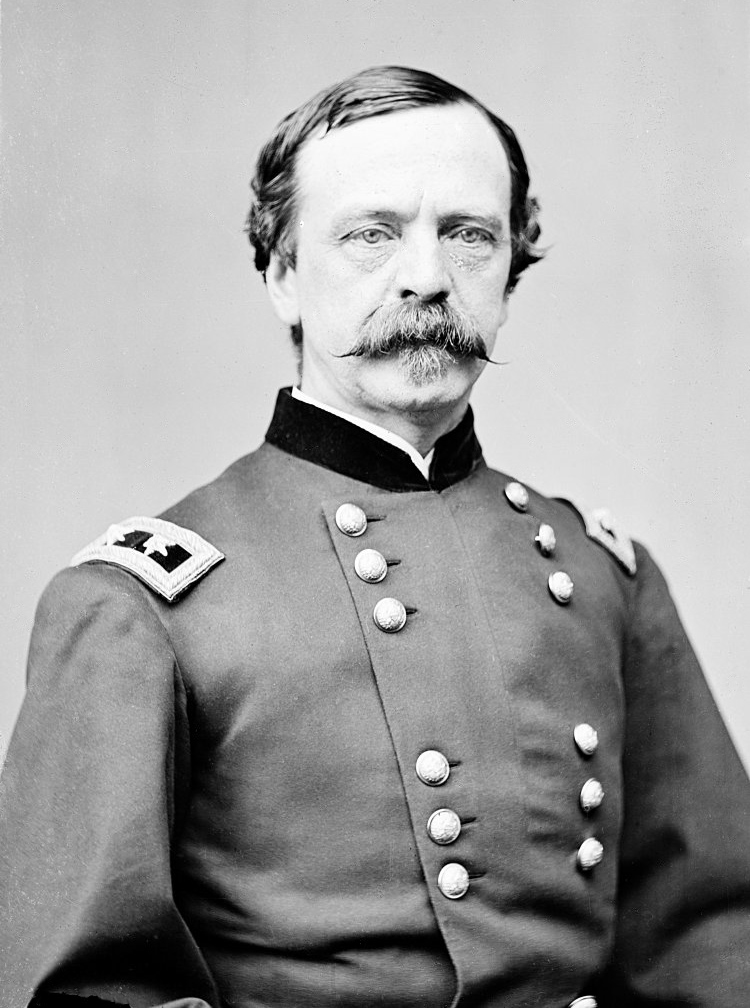
Daniel E. Sickles raised and organized much of what became the Excelsior Brigade

At the outbreak of the Civil War, the controversial Sickles desired to repair his public image, which had been marred by the shooting death of his wife's paramour, Philip Barton Key. Sickles was active in raising thousands of recruits from around New York City for service in the United States volunteers in May 1861 under the authority of the War Department. The first of Sickles' regiments mustered into service on June 20, 1861. Subsequently, he was appointed as the colonel of one of the four full regiments he organized. Later, Sickles was promoted to brigadier general of volunteers in September 1861, taking command of the brigade.

The four regiments raised by Sickles that comprised the first Excelsior Brigade were the 70th, 72nd, 73rd, and 74th New York Infantry.

In October 1861, the 71st New York, along with the 70th through the 74th Regiments and 10 Companies of the 3rd Indiana Cavalry, formed the Second Excelsior Brigade under General Sickles. The brigade was placed under the overall divisional command of Maj. Gen. Joseph Hooker in October. Its initial tasks included assisting in the building of defenses around Washington and stopping resupply of the Confederates from Southern Maryland.

In March 1862, Sickles was forced to relinquish command when Congress refused to confirm his commission, but he worked diligently to lobby among his Washington political contacts and reclaimed both his rank and his command on May 24, 1862, in time to rejoin the Army in the Peninsula Campaign. Because of this interruption, he missed his brigade's significant actions at the Battle of Williamsburg. Sickles was back in charge in time for the Battle of Seven Pines and the Seven Days Battles.

On the morning of June 25 at the Battle of Oak Grove, Sickles's New Yorkers encountered difficulties moving through their abatis, then through the upper portions of an impeding swamp, and finally met stiff Confederate resistance, all of which threw the Federal line out of alignment.

Sickles was again absent for the Second Battle of Bull Run, having used his political influences to obtain leave to go to New York City to recruit new troops. Col. Nelson Taylor instead led the brigade.

The Excelsior Brigade, still under Colonel Taylor as Sickles had been promoted to divisional command, missed the Battle of Antietam in September because the III Corps was stationed on the lower Potomac River, protecting the capital.

The brigade's strength had been augmented by the addition of the 120th New York. In the Battle of Fredericksburg, the Excelsiors were led by Col. George B. Hall.

Brig. Gen. Joseph W. Revere commanded the Excelsior Brigade during the Battle of Chancellorsville in early May 1863. With the rest of Hooker's old division, it was held in reserve in some woods near the Chancellor House, guarding a road that led to the important United States ford over the Rappahannock River.

== The Gettysburg Campaign ==
Following the Battle of Chancellorsville, Col. William R. Brewster of the 73rd New York assumed command of the Excelsior Brigade, which was then in the division of Brig. Gen Andrew A. Humphreys. Brewster led the brigade during the Gettysburg campaign in June and July 1863. On July 2, the brigade was advanced to an area near the Peach Orchard. It was flanked out of that position by the Confederate division of Maj. Gen. Lafayette McLaws. The remains of the brigade took part in a counterattack late in the afternoon that recaptured some abandoned Union guns. Brewster reported that the brigade lost 778 of 1,837 engaged.

Brewster fell ill after the battle, and Brig. Gen. Francis Barretto Spinola assumed command during the pursuit of the Confederate army into Virginia. Spinola's brigade led the Union troops on July 23 at the Battle of Wapping Heights in Linden, Virginia, suffering 18 men killed, including two officers. Spinola was badly wounded in the fighting, along with dozens of his men.

Col. J. Egbert Farnum of the 70th New York then commanded the brigade until Brewster returned to active duty for the autumn campaigns of 1863. Brewster inspired his men by rising from his “sick bed” to lead the Excelsiors in the Mine Run Campaign.

== 1864 and the end of the brigade ==
When the Army of the Potomac was reorganized in the spring of 1864 for the Overland Campaign of Lt. Gen. Ulysses S. Grant, Brewster retained brigade command. The Excelsior Brigade, augmented with the 11th Massachusetts and the 84th Pennsylvania, served in the Battle of the Wilderness in the Fourth Division, II Corps under Brig. Gen. Gershom Mott. When the remnants of the division became part of the Third Division of Maj. Gen. David B. Birney during the Battle of Spotsylvania, Brewster's brigade became the division's Fourth Brigade. He led these men at the Battle of Cold Harbor and in the initial operations of the Siege of Petersburg. Then the brigade was abolished. Most of the Excelsiors were moved to the First Brigade, Third Division.

The individual regiments mustered out of the army during the summer of 1864, and the men returned home to New York.
