= 73rd New York Infantry Regiment =

- Active: July to October 1861 – June 29, 1865
- Country: United States of America
- Allegiance: Union
- Branch: Union Army
- Type: Infantry Zouaves
- Role: Infantry
- Size: 1,100
- Nickname(s): Second Fire Zouaves, Excelsior Zouaves, 4th Excelsior Regiment
- Engagements: American Civil War: Siege of Yorktown; Battle of Williamsburg; Battle of Seven Pines/Fair Oaks; Seven Days Battles; Manassas Station Operations; Second Battle of Bull Run; Battle of Fredericksburg; Battle of Chancellorsville; Battle of Gettysburg; Battle of Wapping Heights; Mine Run Campaign; Overland Campaign; Battle of the Wilderness; Battle of Spotsylvania Court House; Battle of North Anna; Battle of Totopotomoy Creek; Battle of Cold Harbor; Siege of Petersburg

Commanders
- Colonel: William R. Brewster
- Notable commanders: Colonel

Insignia
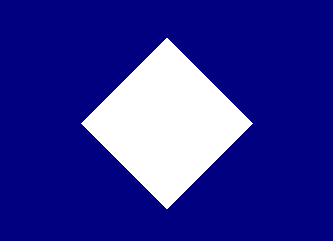
- 2nd Division, III Corps

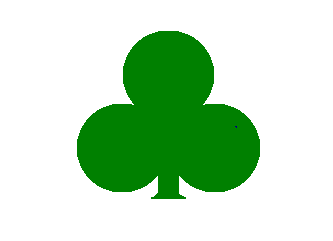
- 4th Division, II Corps

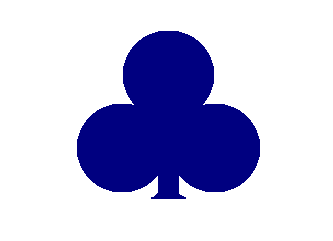
- 3rd Division, II Corps

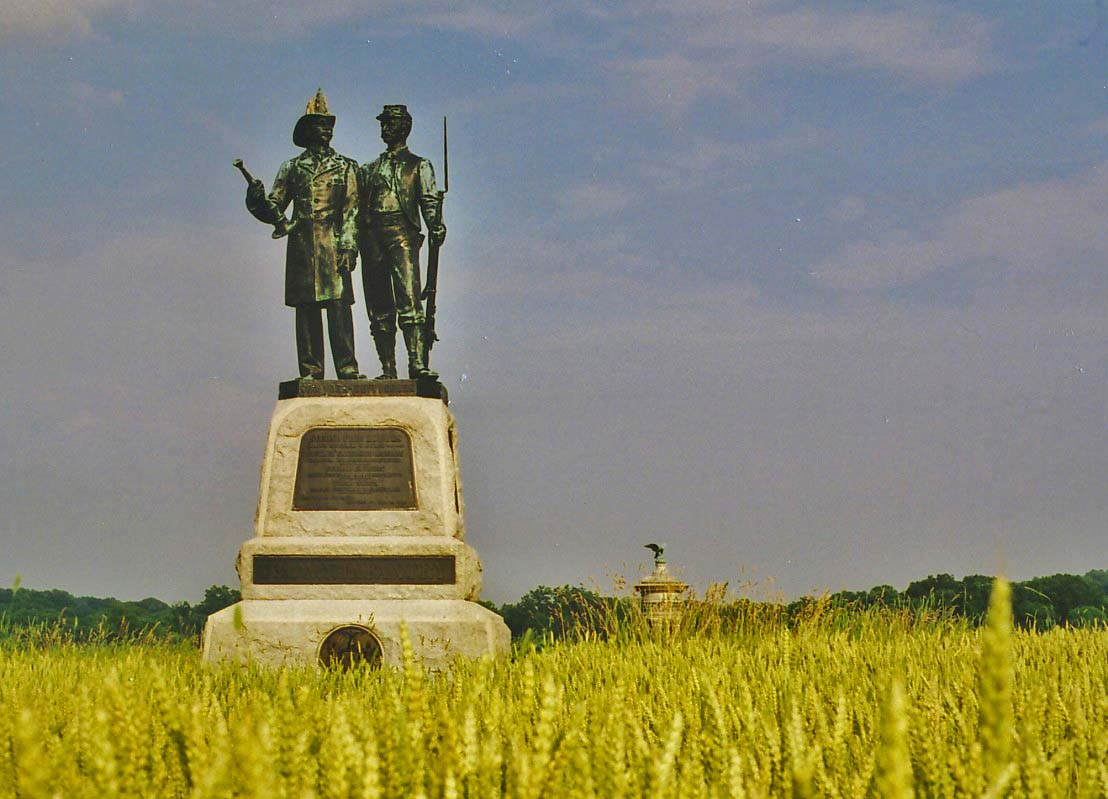
73rd New York Infantry Monument, Gettysburg Battlefield (NYSMM)

The 73rd New York Infantry Regiment was an infantry regiment of Union Army in the American Civil War. The regiment was organized in New York City in May 1861, originally under the designation the Fourth Excelsior Regiment, as a Zouave regiment, known for its unusual dress and drill style. The uniform worn by this regiment consisted of a dark blue chasseur jacket with light blue trim and light blue trefoils on each sleeve, sky blue chasseur trousers with two white stripes down each leg, brown leather gaiters, a light blue kepi with a dark blue band and dark blue piping, and a red Zouave fez with a blue tassel as a fatigue cap. Drawn from the ranks of the city's many volunteer fire companies, the unit was known alternately as the Second Fire Zouaves, after the 11th New York was known as the First Fire Zouaves, and they were also known as the Excelsior Zouaves. Some of the men wore the brass letters "E Z" on the bands of their kepis. Many artists have depicted this regiment also with red shirts with the collar sticking out over the jacket creating a "red collar."

The unit served in the Excelsior Brigade in several battles, including Antietam, Chancellorsville, Gettysburg, and Appomattox Courthouse.

Their monument at Gettysburg shows a statue of a volunteer fireman from the New York Fire Department, which was disbanded in 1865, standing hand-in-hand with a zouave of the 73rd New York Volunteer Infantry Regiment, wearing the uniform of their veteran's organization.

== See also ==
- List of New York Civil War regiments
