= Linden, Virginia =

Unincorporated community in Virginia, United States

- Unincorporated community
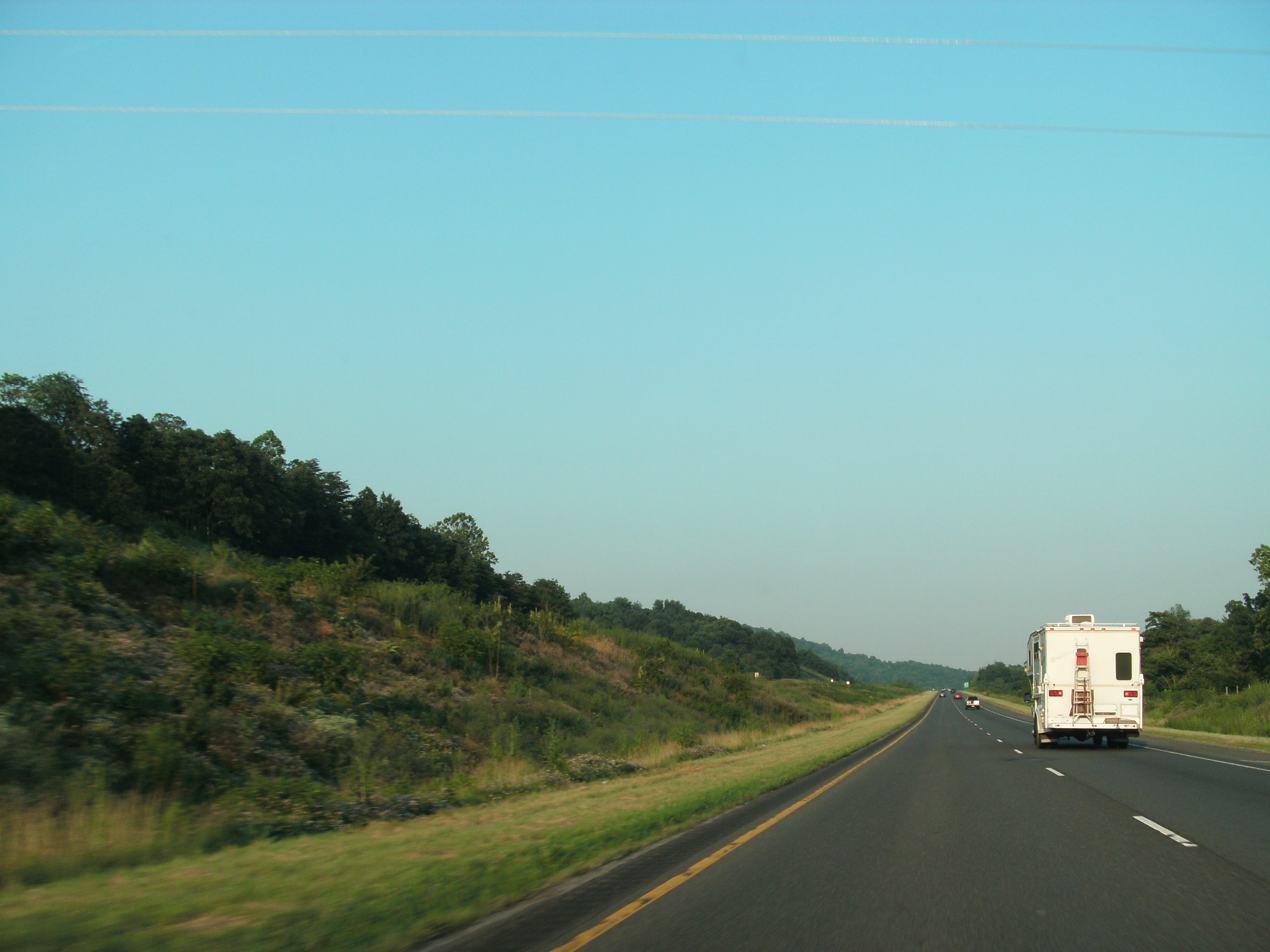
- About 3 miles west of Linden on I-66

- Location within the Commonwealth of Virginia Linden (Virginia) Linden (the United States)
- Coordinates: 38°54′29″N 78°4′30″W
- Country: United States
- State: Virginia
- County: Fauquier and Warren
- Time zone: UTC−5 (Eastern (EST))
  - Summer (DST): UTC−4 (EDT)
- ZIP codes: 22642
- Area code: 540

Linden is a small unincorporated village in Fauquier and Warren Counties in the U.S. state of Virginia. It is located west of Washington, D.C. at exit 13 off Interstate 66.

== History ==
In 1669, the "official" discovery of the Shenandoah Valley was credited to John Lederer and John Catlett at the present day site of Linden. The discovery and mapping of the area helped to open the area for further settlement. A marker at the intersection of VA 55 and SR 638 in Linden help commemorate this event.

From the mid-18th century to the 1950s, the Linden area was home to 25 apple orchards. The Linden Methodist Church was built in 1842 and numerous buildings still exist dating from the 19th century. In November 1954, tragedy struck the Linden church. A fire thought to be caused by a faulty pipe in the wood-burning stove destroyed the beautiful 112-year-old wooden structure. Its towering steeple and bell had long been an iconic landmark in the community. The Front Royal Fire Department courageously fought the blaze for four hours before it was squelched. Several heroic men in the Linden community, including Rev. B. L. Lock entered the burning building to salvage the church's antique pulpit, pews and bible. All were relics from a church building that had previously served the congregation.

The fire revealed several graves beneath the church's stone foundation making it very difficult to rebuild at the same site. Therefore, the congregation decided to relocate the Linden church next to the parsonage, on the opposite side of Highway 55. In December 1955, the ground breaking ceremony for the new Linden church at its current location took place. When completed, the new church was furnished with the pulpit and pews that had been rescued from the flames.

=== Civil War ===
The relative ease of settlers crossing the Blue Ridge at the gap also allowed Linden to serve as a point of transit for the armies of both the Union and Confederate States during the United States Civil War. Linden was part of "Mosby's Confederacy" and served as rallying and rest points for the Confederate Rangers Mosby's Rangers under Colonel John S. Mosby. Numerous locations illustrating the daring and tenacity of the band are a short drive from Linden.

==== Battle of Manassas Gap ====
A small battle and postscript to the Confederate Gettysburg campaign, the Battle of Manassas Gap occurred a half mile from Linden on July 23, 1863. After retreating across the Potomac River at Williamsport, Maryland, Lee's Army of Northern Virginia withdrew up the Shenandoah Valley. George G. Meade's Army of the Potomac crossed the river east of the Blue Ridge Mountains and followed Lee into Virginia. On July 23, Meade ordered the III Corps, under Maj. Gen. William H. French, to cut off the retreating Confederate columns at Front Royal, Virginia, by forcing passage through Manassas Gap. At first light, French began slowly pushing Brig. Gen. James A. Walker's Confederate brigade (the Stonewall Brigade, part of Maj. Gen. Richard H. Anderson's division) back into the gap. About 4:30 p.m., a strong Union attack drove Walker's men until they were reinforced by Robert E. Rodes's division and artillery. By dusk, the poorly coordinated Union attacks were abandoned. During the night, Confederate forces withdrew into the Luray Valley. On July 24, the Union army occupied Front Royal, but Lee's army was safely beyond pursuit.

== Today ==
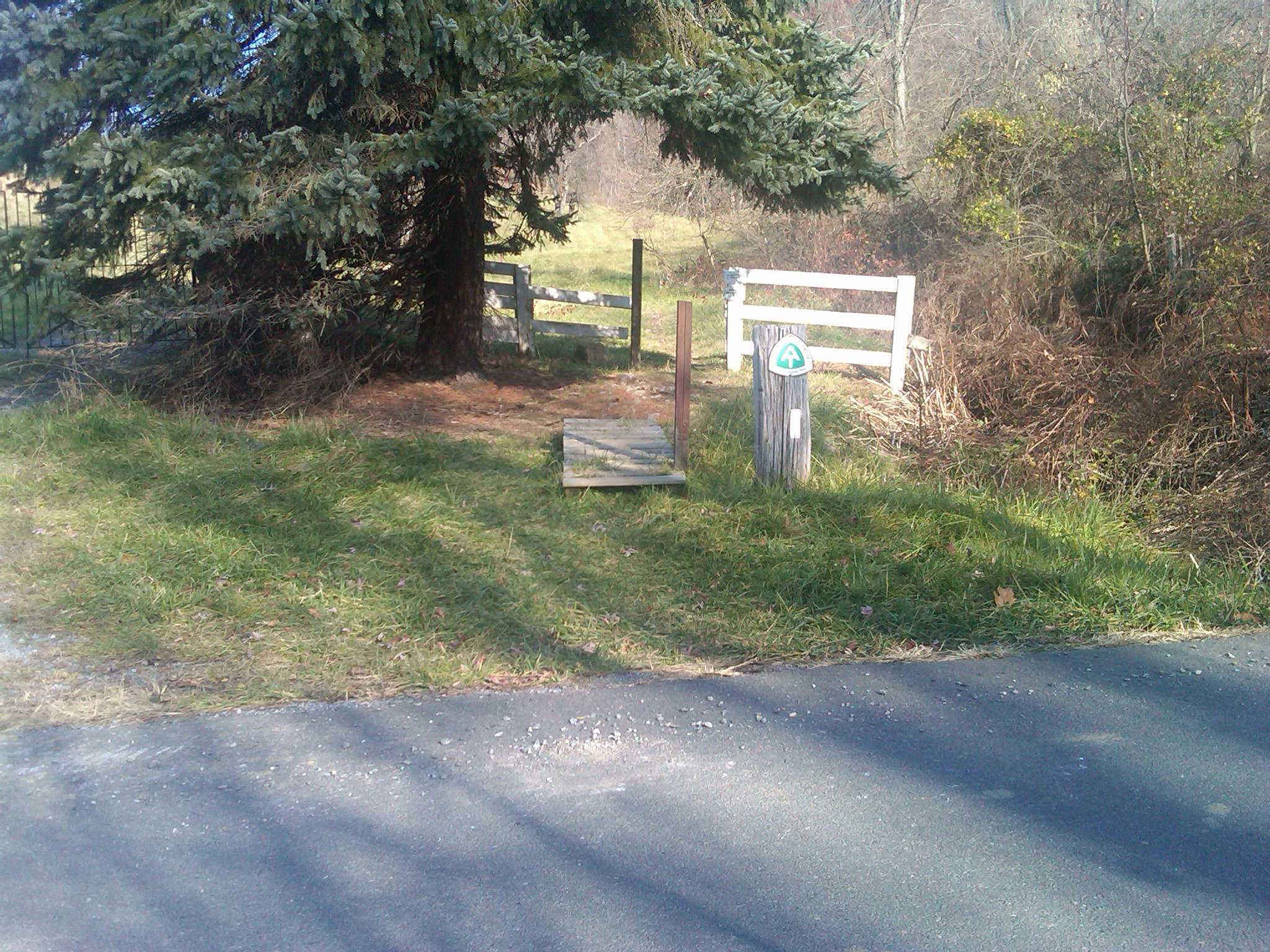
Appalachian Trail in Linden

Linden is mostly a bedroom community with subdivisions known as Apple Mountain Lake and Blue Mountain. It has two gas stations, three stores, a restaurant, and a post office with zip code 22642.

Linden is home to St. Dominic's Monastery, Appalachian Trail access points, and the G. Richard Thompson Wildlife Management Area.

A primary Appalachian Trail access point is on Tuckers lane off of Route 55 the John Marshall Highway. Turn onto Tuckers Lane from John Marshall Highway and go under I-66 to the parking area on your right.

== Geography ==
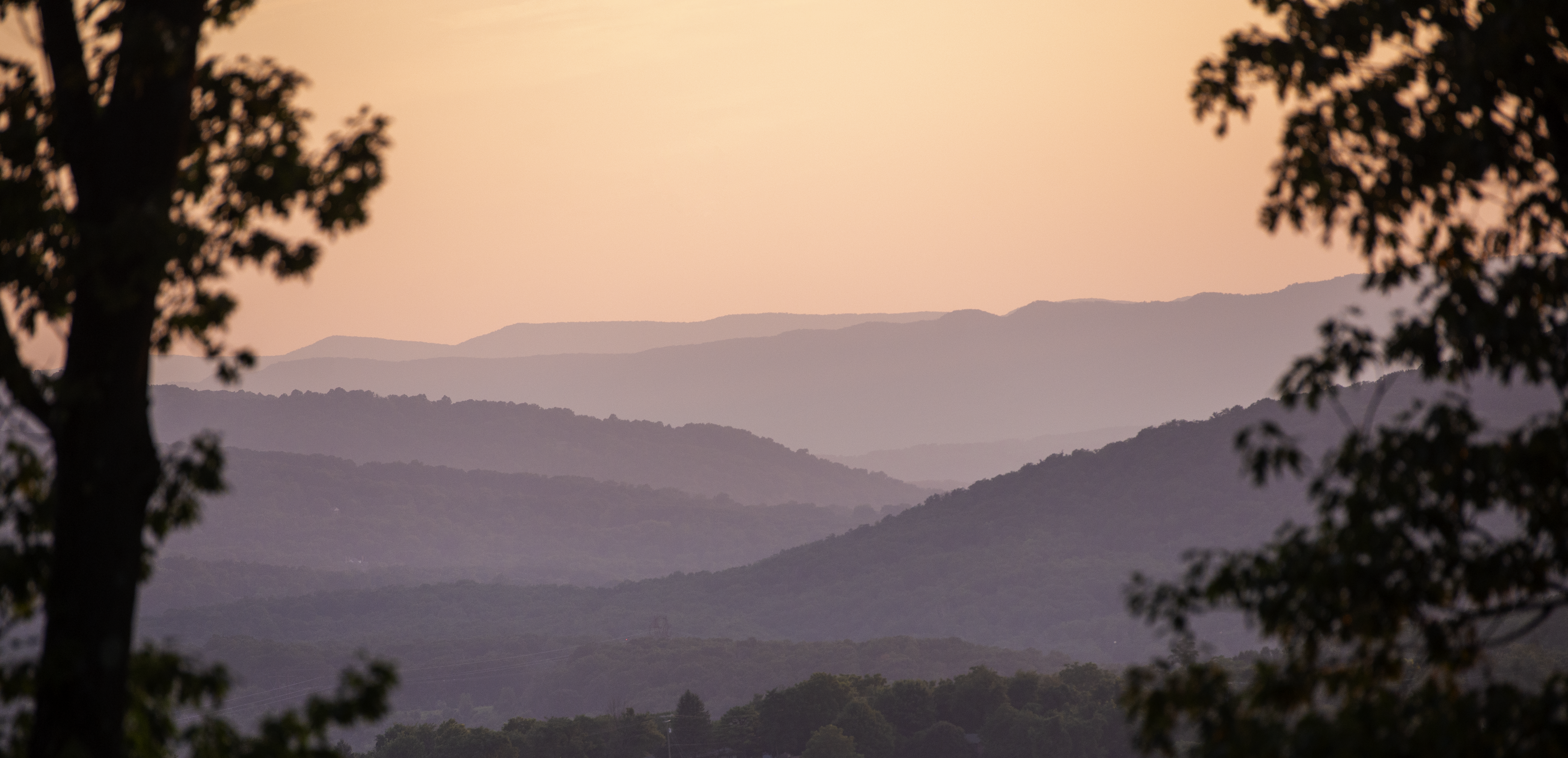
Mountains in Linden, VA © Michael Porterfield

Linden sits astride the Warren and Fauquier County line, SR 55 (the John Marshall Highway) and Interstate Highway 66. At 945 feet (288 m) above sea level, it sits at the top of the Manassas Gap in the Blue Ridge Mountains, making it a gateway into the Shenandoah Valley today (as it was for early settlers in the area). The Manassas Gap Railroad was completed in 1854; it ran through Linden from Mount Jackson to Manassas Junction, giving the town of Manassas its name. Today, the tracks form a part of the Norfolk Southern rail system. The popular north–south Appalachian Trail crosses Hwy 55 (John Marshall Hwy) and under I-66 in Linden at County Rd 725 (Tuckers Ln.) as it follows its way along the east side of the Blue Ridge.

While the "village" of Linden sits at 945 feet (288 m) above sea level, many of the surrounding attractions and activity areas with road access climb above 2,100 feet (640 m), making for a diverse natural experience.

== Geology ==
The soils in Linden are developed from granite, granite gneiss, greenstone and chloritic schist. The terrain ranges from rolling to steep landscapes that are dissected by Goose Creek and its tributaries that feed from runs and springs from the east side of the Blue Ridge Mountains. The rolling uplands contain soils that are loamy to silty and can be shallow to bedrock. On the steeper upland sections, the soils are loamy with stones and rock outcrops evident on the surface.

== Schools ==
Schools K–12, operated by the Warren County School Board, are located in Front Royal for students who live on the Warren County side of town. High schoolers attend Warren County High School. Mountain Laurel Montessori School is in nearby Front Royal.

Students who live in Fauquier County attend primary and middle schools in the Marshall area, while high school students attend Fauquier High School in Warrenton, VA.

== Flora and fauna ==
Here is a list of commonly seen local flora and fauna in and around Linden.

- Plants
- Reptiles
  - Snakes, venomous
    - Northern copperhead (Agkistrodon contortrix mokasen)
    - Timber rattlesnake (Crotalus horridus horridus)
  - Snakes, non-venomous
    - Black snake (Pantherophis obsoletus)
  - Turtles and tortoises
    - Eastern box turtle (Terrapene carolina carolina)
- Amphibians
  - American toad (Bufo americanus)
- Fish
- Birds
  - Eastern bluebird (Sialia sialis)
  - American robin (Turdus migratorius)
  - Grey catbird (Dumetella carolinensis)
  - Black vulture (Coragyps atratus)
- Mammals
  - White-tailed deer (Odocoileus virginianus)
  - Black bear (Ursus americanus)
  - Grey fox (Urocyon cinereoargenteus)
  - Eastern grey squirrel (Sciurus carolinensis)
  - Eastern chipmunk (Tamias striatus)
  - Eastern cottontail (Sylvilagus floridanus)
  - Groundhog (Marmota monax)
- Invertebrates
  - Crustaceans
    - Common crayfish (Cambarus bartonii)
  - Cnidariae
    - Freshwater jellyfish (Craspedacusta sowerbyi)
  - Arachnids
    - Northern black widow (Latrodectus variolus)
    - Wolf spiders (Lycosidae)
