= Henry Prince (general) =

American military officer (1811 – 1892)

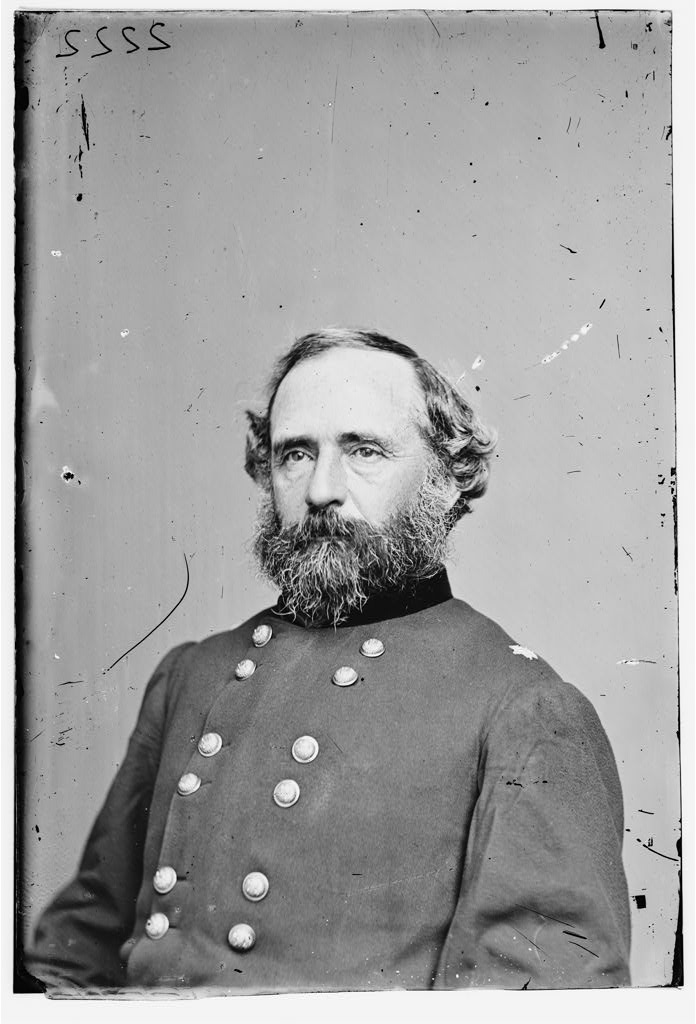
- Born: June 19, 1811; Eastport, Maine
- Died: August 19, 1892 (aged 81) London, United Kingdom
- Cause of death: Suicide
- Buried: Hillside Cemetery, Eastport, Maine 44.91080, -66.99250
- Allegiance: United States; Union
- Branch: United States Army; Union Army
- Service years: 1835–1877
- Rank: Lieutenant colonel Brigadier General
- Commands: Second division, III Corps
- Conflicts: Second Seminole War; Mexican American War; Battle of Talome; Battle of National Bridge; Battle of Contreras; Battle of Churubusco; Battle of Molino del Rey; Utah War; Mountain Meadows Massacre; American Civil War; Northern Virginia campaign; Battle of Cedar Mountain (POW); Gettysburg campaign; Battle of Manassas Gap; Bristoe campaign; Mine Run campaign
- Education: United States Military Academy

Henry Prince (June 19, 1811 – August 19, 1892) was an American military officer and Civil War general. After graduating from the United States Military Academy, he would actively fight in the Seminole Wars and Mexican–American War, and also take on various support roles such as military recruiter, surveyor, fort commander, and eventually paymaster.

With the outbreak of the American Civil War, he would join the United States Volunteers on the Union side and quickly receive an appointment to brigadier general. He would become one of the war's oldest surviving officers, and in 1866, he was awarded an honorary brevet rank of brigadier general in the parallel US Regular Army.

Prince would continue to serve as a paymaster until retiring, and eventually move to England where he lived in financial comfort. However, despondent over constant physical pain from war wounds that had never entirely healed, he committed suicide in a London hotel at the age of 81.

== Background ==
Henry Prince was born in Eastport, Maine, the son of Benjamin D. Prince. His father served as paymaster in the Massachusetts Militia during the War of 1812. Henry Prince would follow in his father's footsteps both as a military officer and paymaster.

Prince enrolled as a cadet at the United States Military Academy on September 1, 1831, and graduated 30th in his class on July 1, 1835. Later on September 18, 1835, the army commissioned Prince as a Brevet Second Lieutenant in the 4th Infantry Regiment.

Prince made his formal oath of allegiance to the United States on November 3, 1835.

== Early service ==
=== The Seminole Wars and Indian Territory ===
Prince's first posting with the 4th Infantry was Florida, where he would see regular action in the Seminole Wars. He participated in several battles, including at Oloklikaha, Thlonotosassa Creek, and Camp Izard where he was wounded in action while defending the fort.

On June 11, 1836, Prince received his formal commission as a 2nd lieutenant. He would remain on duty in Florida through 1837 and into 1838, receiving an appointment to 1st lieutenant on July 7. By the end of 1838, however, the army had transferred Prince and his company to assist with resettling the Muscogee Creek as part of the US government's Indian removal policy.

In 1839, the army posted Prince to Fort Gibson in Indian Territory, and specifically tasked him with helping construct a road to Fort Smith, Arkansas. Later in 1839, the army would reassign him to recruitment duties, which would continue until 1841. In that year, after another period at Fort Gibson, Prince would return to Florida in 1841 for the last years of the Second Seminole War. Prince kept a diary of his time in Florida, which would later be transcribed and published in 1998 with the title Amidst a Storm of Bullets.

After the Florida war ended in 1842, Prince would spend the next several years in various posts and roles, including recruitment, Coast Survey, and finally in late 1846, adjutant of the 4th infantry.

=== Mexican–American War ===
At the start of the Mexican War, Prince was serving in the 4th Infantry on recruiting service. The regiment would soon become involved in action, notably in the Mexico City Campaign. Prince would distinguish himself in his conduct. From November 1846 to September 1847, Prince would serve as adjutant under General George Cadwalader.

John Baillie McIntosh later recalled Prince's actions:

The cool deportment of the experienced officers at this time, particularly of my acting adjutant. Lieutenant Henry Prince, who, at this critical moment, advanced in front of the line and urged the men to follow, greatly contributed to encourage and to restore the enthusiasm of the command...

General Cadwalader described Prince's efforts in a difficult crossing over the highly contested Puente Nacional:

Lieutenant and Adjutant Henry Prince, of the 4th infantry, who had been assigned to command the howitzers, rendered me highly valuable service at this critical moment. He advanced with the battery, and succeeded in breaching the barricades, and preparing the way for our troops to charge, which was made under a heavy fire from the enemy.

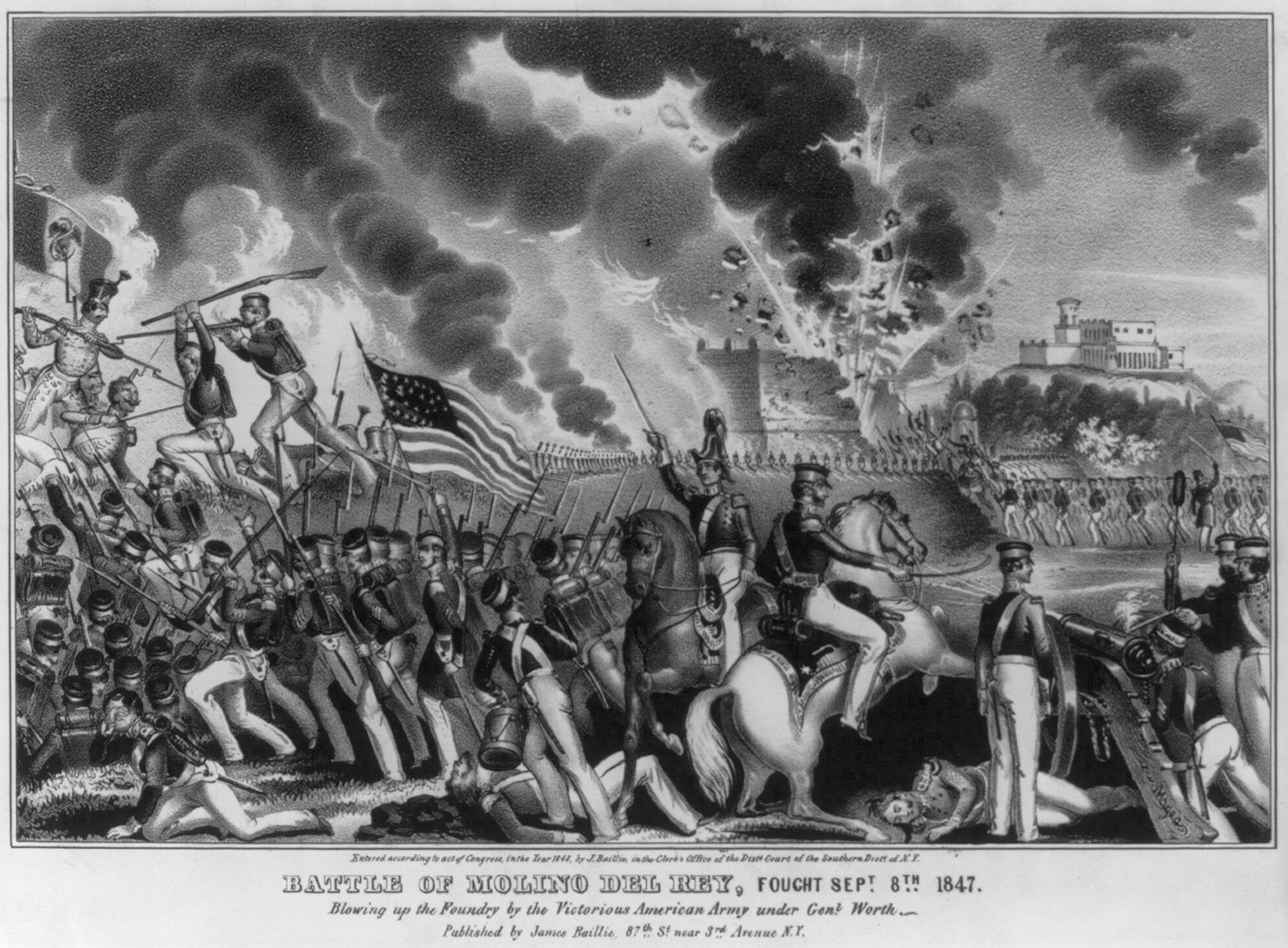
Battle of Molino del Rey

Later, he would take part in both the Battle of Contreras and the Battle of Churubusco, where he would be brevetted for gallantry for his actions.

On September 8, 1847, at the Battle of Molino del Rey, Prince was severely wounded with an injury that would trouble him for the remainder of his life. Maj. Francis Lee recounted, "Prince was severely wounded while actively engaged in encouraging and animating the men by his example".

During his recovery, Prince would be promoted to Captain of the 4th Infantry on September 26, 1847. He would additionally receive a brevet major for his actions in the Battle of Molino del Rey.

=== Paymaster ===
Prince would spend the next three years recovering from his injury at home in Maine. While convalescing, he was in communication with the Army regularly. Despite the state of his injury, Prince wished to make himself available to the Army in Maine should needs arise.

Prince returned to active duty on December 10, 1850. He would serve as a Coast Surveyor for the next five years. On March 7, 1855, he took command of Fort Steilacoom, Washington.

On May 23, 1855, Prince was promoted to the rank of Major. That year he would begin serving as paymaster, a role that his father had once performed in the War of 1812. In 1857 he became paymaster in San Antonio, and later served in the Utah Campaign. During his time in Utah, Prince was engaged in the response to the Mountain Meadows Massacre.

== Civil War ==
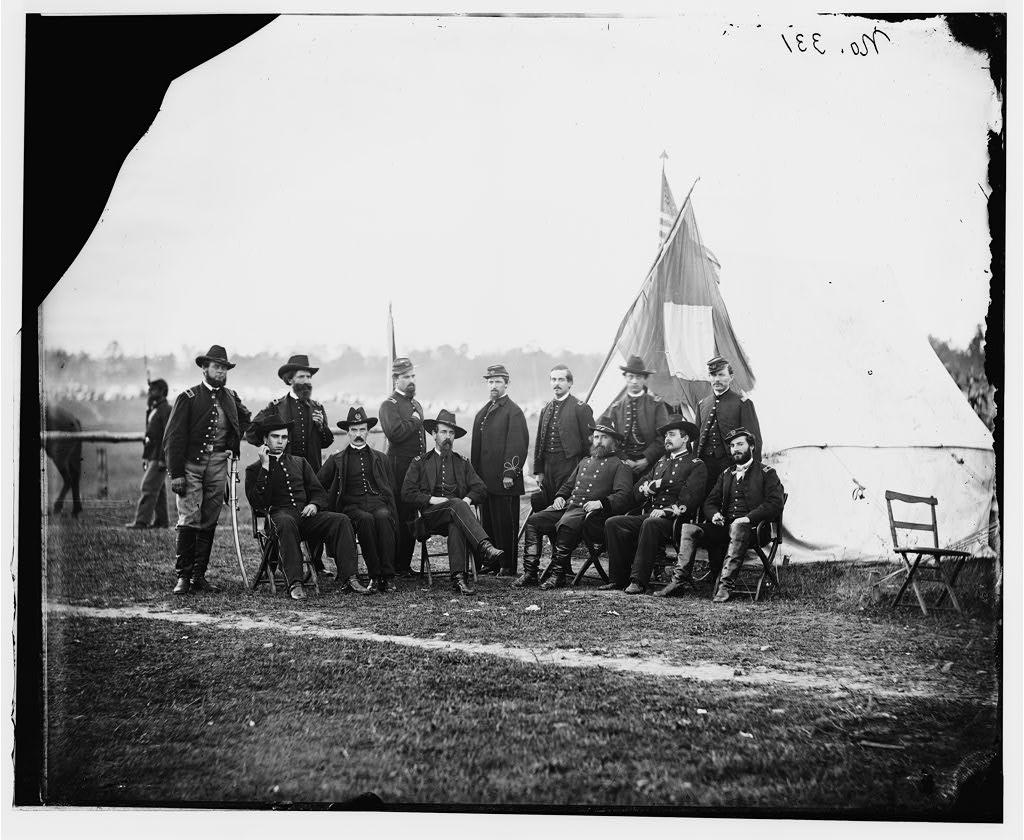
Brig. Gen. Henry Prince of the 2d Division, 3d Corps, and staff, Culpeper, Virginia. Photograph from the main Eastern theater of the Civil War, Meade in Virginia, August–November 1863. Prince is seated third from right.

At the outbreak of the Civil War, Prince was working in the Army's pay department as a paymaster.

Prince would join the 6th Maine Infantry Regiment, as part of Company K. Prince was first elected Colonel of the regiment, but later declined the position as he would have had to resign his position as paymaster.

On April 28, 1862, he was appointed Brigadier General United States Volunteers. He would then command a brigade and later a division in Nathaniel P. Banks's Army of Virginia.

On August 9, 1862, he was captured in a cornfield during the Battle of Cedar Mountain, Virginia. He described the moment of his capture in a report to the military command:

On approaching the right I perceived that the firing in the other brigades had ceased, which forcibly impressed upon me the necessity of learning immediately something of the day. No staff officer was left with me. I was the only mounted person present. I determined to go back to the ridge, where I might see the field or communicate with others... While walking my horse in the dense corn, where the ground was heavy, my bridle was seized, and I perceived that I was in the midst of enemies before otherwise discovering any person to be there.

After he was exchanged, he participated in the North Carolina campaigns and then the Overland campaign.

Prince would later command the Second division of the III Corps. As division commander, he participated in the Battle of Manassas Gap, as well as the Bristoe and Mine Run campaigns. His participation in the Mine Run campaign came under scrutiny as William H. French blamed his failure to exploit a Confederate advantage on one of his "division commanders", widely considered to be Prince. Prince would successfully defend himself against French's accusations after the war concluded.

After Mine Run, Prince was removed from his division command. In 1864 and 1865, he held commands over garrisons in Tennessee, Alabama and South Carolina.

On July 17, 1866, President Andrew Johnson nominated Prince for appointment to the grade of Brevet Brigadier General, U.S.A. (Regular Army), to rank from March 13, 1865, and the United States Senate confirmed the appointment on July 23, 1866.

== Postwar life ==
On April 30, 1866, he was mustered out of the volunteer service. He continued to serve in the Army and returned to his work in the pay department.

In 1869 he was named as paymaster for New York city under the Military Division of the Atlantic. In 1873 while serving in New York he was proposed as a member to the Century Association by George S. Green. He was elected a member on October 4, 1873.

In 1875 he was assigned to the command of Deputy Paymaster General of the Military Division of the Pacific. He rose to Lieutenant-colonel and then department paymaster general in 1877. He would then retire from army service on December 31, 1879, at age 62.

In 1886, Prince was living in Fitchburg, Massachusetts. While in the process of moving his belongings from Maine to Massachusetts, the facility where they were stored caught fire, causing him to lose a significant amount of his private papers, books, records and valuables.

Prince later moved to England where he was said to live off the interest of his retirement pension of $3,000 per year. He was considered quite wealthy and the former paymaster reportedly had no money troubles.

=== Death ===
On August 19, 1892, Prince committed suicide at Morley's Hotel on Trafalgar Square in London at the age of 81.

Six weeks prior to his death, Prince was receiving treatment for chronic Bright's disease. He was reportedly seriously depressed, telling his physician that he wished to die and asking for sedatives. He was refused. Two days before his death, Prince purchased a revolver for protection from a local gunsmith.

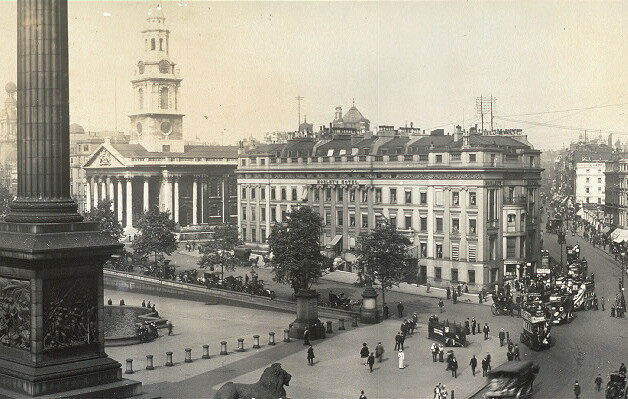
Morley's Hotel in Trafalgar Square, pictured in 1908

Prince's body was found by a chambermaid with a bullet wound above the right temple. Prince left an unsealed letter that read:

To all friends, When life has run its cycle and become a waste of nature in the body, overwhelming its natural and physical qualities with weakness and pain to an intolerable degree, it may with all propriety be removed. Such being the case with the life of the writer, his apology to the world is by these terms made through his most beloved and most intimate friends, who, he trusts, will appreciate the relief to him and ceaseless distress, which in his opinion, ought to be brought by the physician who is summoned with his drugs surely for that purpose when not to cure.

A coroner's inquest recorded a verdict of "Suicide while in a state of unsound mind". Prince's body was returned to the United States and he was buried in Hillside Cemetery, in his hometown of Eastport, Maine. Prince never married and reportedly left no near relatives.

== See also ==
- List of American Civil War generals (Union)
- Aztec Club of 1847
