= Battle of Washington =

Battle of the American Civil War

Coordinates: 35.5443°N 77.0601°W

Battle of Washington, North Carolina
- Part of the American Civil War
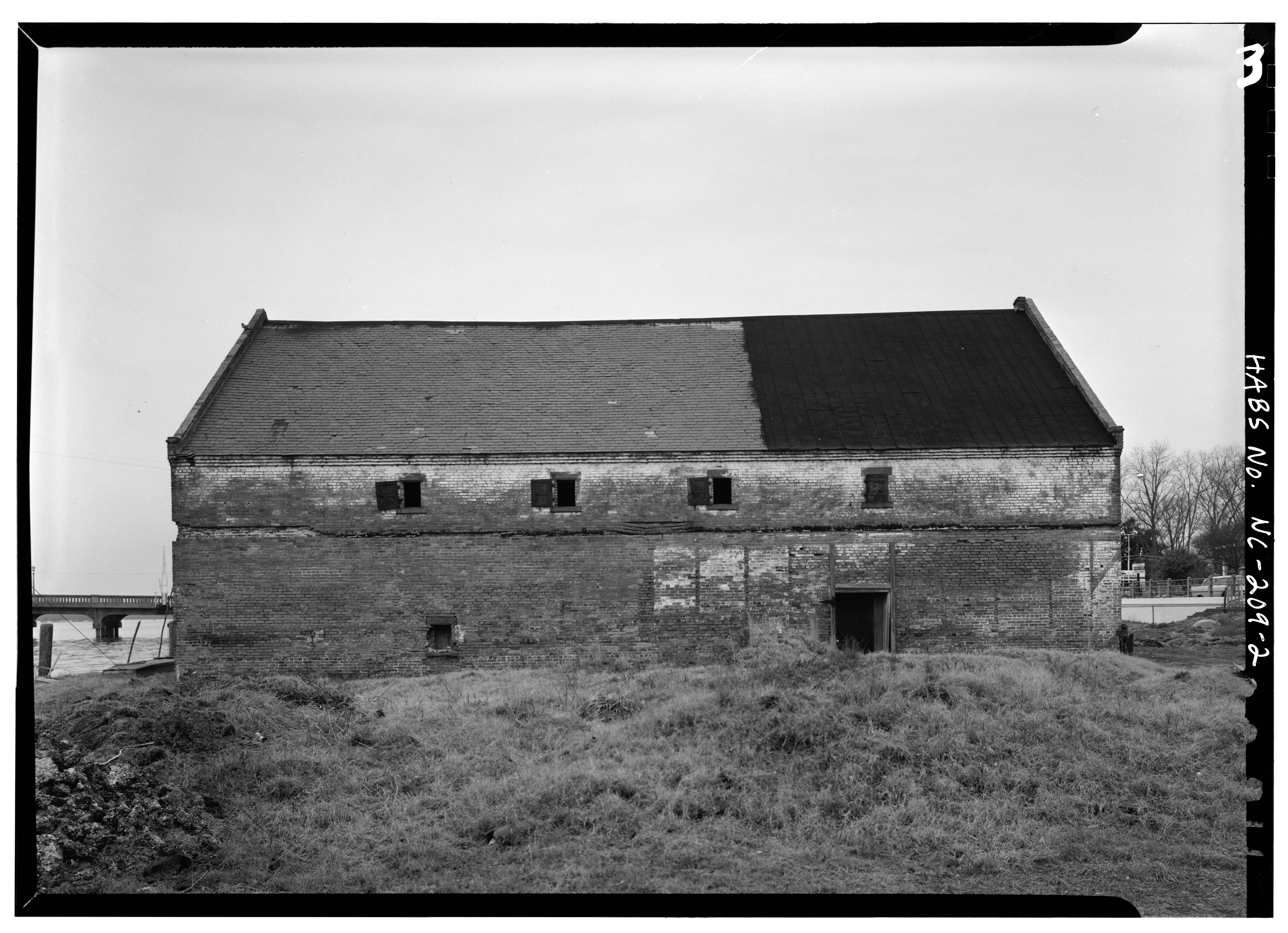
- Union forces attempted to set fire to Havens Warehouse (above) but it survived the war.
Date	March 30, 1863 – April 20, 1863 (3 weeks)
Location	Beaufort County, North Carolina
Result	Inconclusive

Belligerents
United States (Union)	(Confederate States of America) CSA (Confederacy)

Commanders and leaders
John G. Foster	Daniel H. Hill

Units involved
XVIII Corps; Washington Garrison	Hill's division

Strength
6 regiments artillery units 12,000	1 Division 9,000

Casualties and losses
40	60

The Battle of Washington took place from March 30 to April 19, 1863, in Beaufort County, North Carolina. It was part of the Confederate Tidewater operations conducted by Lieutenant General James Longstreet during the American Civil War. This battle is sometimes referred to as the siege of Little Washington.

== Background ==
After the culmination of Burnside's North Carolina Expedition little attention had been given to North Carolina by the Confederate Army. In December 1862 a Union expedition from New Bern destroyed the railroad bridge at Goldsborough, N.C. along the vital Wilmington and Weldon Railroad. This expedition caused only temporary damage to the railroad, but did prompt Confederate authorities to devote more attention to the situation along the coast of Virginia and North Carolina.

Following the Confederate victory at Fredericksburg, General Robert E. Lee felt confident enough to dispatch a large portion of his army to deal with Union occupation forces along the coast. The whole force was put under the command of Lieutenant General James Longstreet. While Longstreet personally operated against Suffolk, Major General D. H. Hill led a column which moved against Federal garrisons at New Bern and Washington, North Carolina.

Major General John G. Foster, commanding the Department of North Carolina, was responsible for the overall defense of the Union garrisons along the North Carolina coast. After Hill's attack against New Bern failed, Foster arrived in Washington to take personal command of the garrison.

== Siege ==
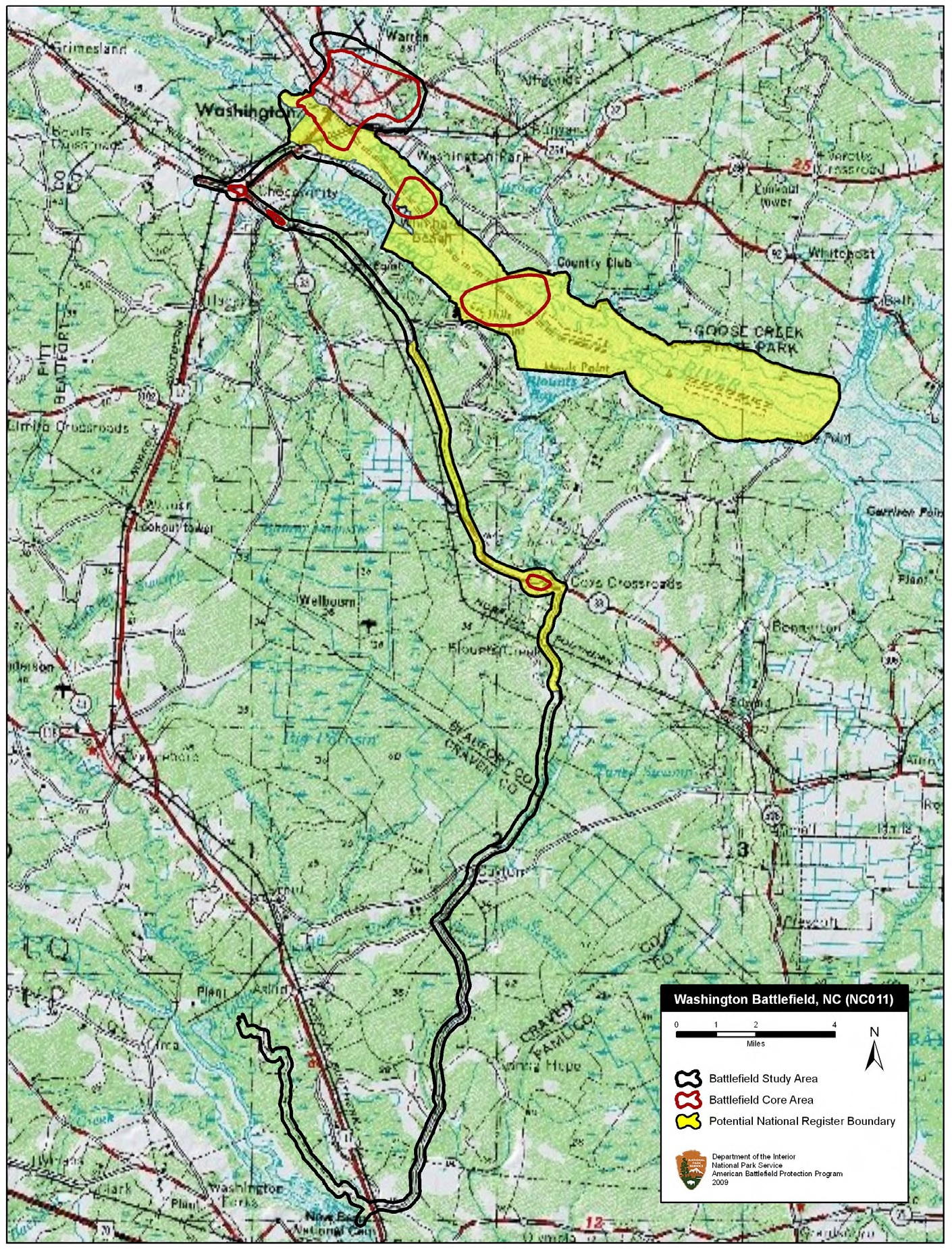
Map of Washington Battlefield core and study areas by the American Battlefield Protection Program.

Foster, a West Point trained Army engineer, put his skills to good use improving the town's defenses as well as employing the use of three gunboats in the defense. By March 30, the town was ringed with fortifications, and Brigadier General Richard B. Garnett's brigade began the investment of Washington. Meanwhile, Hill established batteries as well as river obstructions along the Tar River to impede reinforcements. He also posted two brigades south of Washington to guard for any relief efforts coming overland from New Bern. The Confederates sent a message to Foster demanding surrender. Foster replied saying "If the Confederates want Washington, come and get it." Despite this defiance, Foster lacked the strength to dislodge the besiegers, and Hill was under orders to avoid an assault at the risk of sustaining heavy casualties. Thus, the engagement devolved into one of artillery, and even so the Confederates limited their fire to conserve their ammunition. In time both sides were running low on supplies, and conditions grew miserable in the rain and mud. Despite the lack of progress against Washington, Hill was accomplishing a vital objective in the form of foraging parties so long as the Federals were pinned down.

=== Relief efforts ===
A Federal relief column under Brigadier General Henry Prince sailed up the Tar River. Once Prince saw the Rebel batteries, he simply turned the transports around. A second effort under Brigadier General Francis Barretto Spinola moved overland from New Bern. Spinola was defeated along Blount's Creek and returned to New Bern. Foster decided that he would escape Washington and personally lead the relief effort leaving his chief of staff, Brigadier General Edward E. Potter, in command at Washington. On April 13, the USS Escort braved the Confederate batteries and made its way into Washington. The Escort delivered supplies and reinforcements in the form of a Rhode Island regiment. It was aboard this ship on April 15 that Foster made his escape. The ship was badly damaged and the pilot mortally wounded, but Foster made it out.

=== Raising the siege ===
About the same time Foster made an escape, Hill was faced with numerous reasons that ultimately led to his withdrawal: the completion of his foraging efforts, Union supplies reaching the Federal garrison, and finally a message arrived from Longstreet requesting reinforcements for an assault on Suffolk. Hill broke off the siege on April 15 and began to withdraw Garnett's brigade fronting Washington's defenses.

Meanwhile, Foster had made it back to New Bern and immediately began organizing a relief effort. He ordered General Prince to march along the railroad towards Kinston to hold off Confederates in the vicinity of Goldsborough, while Foster personally led a second column north from New Bern towards Blount's Creek where General Spinola had earlier been turned back. On April 18, Foster ordered Spinola to drive the Confederates from their road block at Swift Creek guarding the direct road from Washington to New Bern. At the same time, General Henry M. Naglee attacked the Confederate rear guard near Washington capturing several prisoners and a regimental battle flag. On April 19 Foster returned to the Washington defenses and by April 20 the Confederates had completely withdrawn from the area.

== Aftermath ==
Apart from raids conducted by Foster and Potter, North Carolina remained relatively quiet until 1864 when Robert E. Lee was able to spare troops for another operation against Federal control posts on along the coast.

== Sources ==
- Chaitin, Peter M., and the Editors of Time-Life Books, The Coastal War: Chesapeake Bay to Rio Grande, Time-Life Books, 1984
- National Park Service battle description
- CWSAC Report Update
