= Francis B. Spinola =

American politician and general (1821–1891)

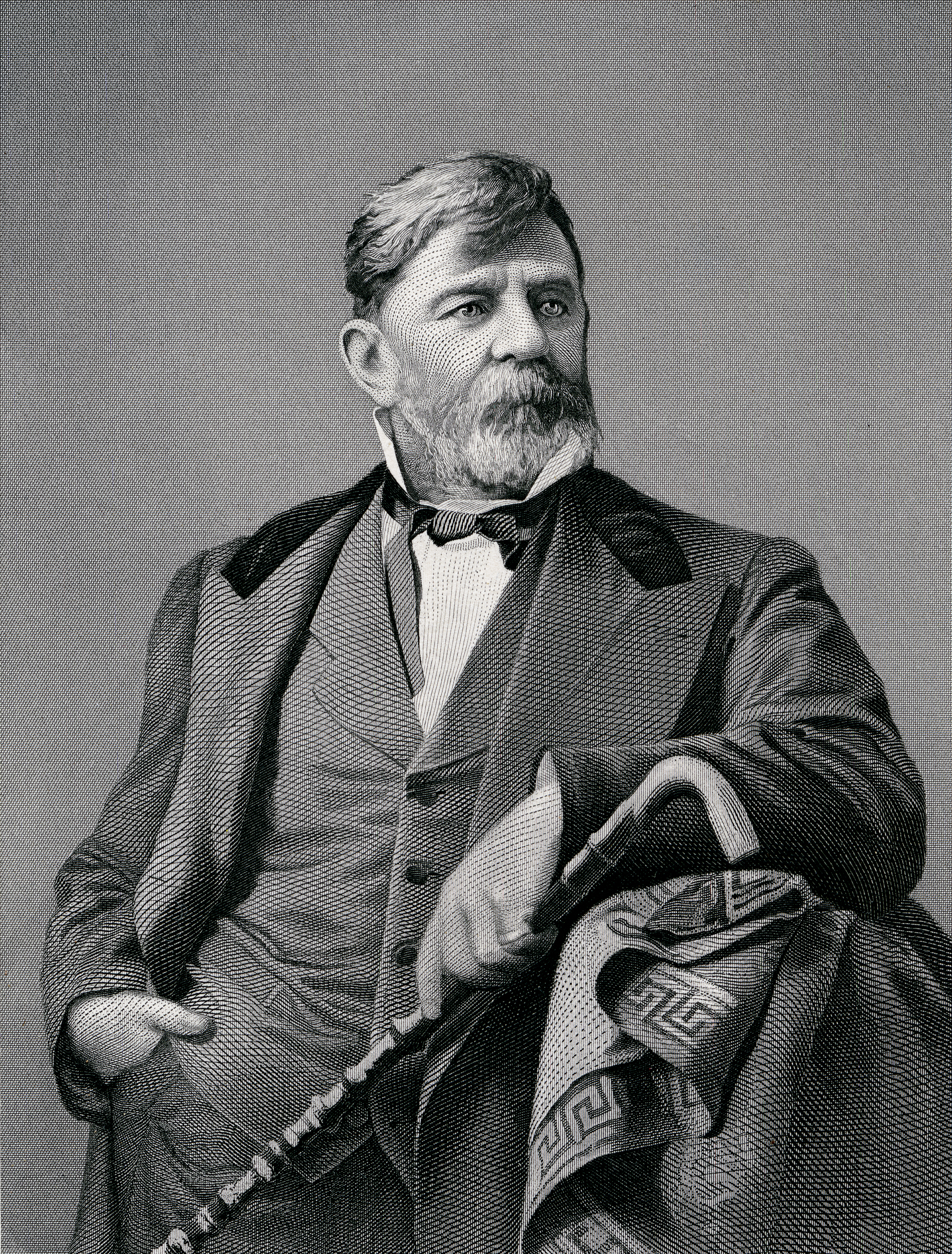
- BEP engraved portrait of Spinola

Member of the U.S. House of Representatives from New York's 10th district
- In office March 4, 1887 – April 14, 1891
- Preceded by: Abram S. Hewitt
- Succeeded by: William Bourke Cockran

Member of the New York Senate from the 3rd district
- In office 1858–1861
- Preceded by: Dan Sickles
- Succeeded by: Henry C. Murphy

Personal details
- Born: Francis Barretto Spinola; March 19, 1821 Old Field, New York, U.S.
- Died: April 14, 1891 (aged 70) Washington, D.C., U.S.
- Resting place: Green-Wood Cemetery, Brooklyn, New York City
- Party: Democratic

Military service
- Allegiance: United States of America; Union
- Branch/service: United States Army; Union Army
- Rank: Brigadier general
- Commands: "Spinola Brigade" (Second Brigade, Second Division, Third Army Corps)
- Battles/wars: American Civil War; Battle of Washington; Battle of Wapping Heights

Francis Barretto Spinola (March 19, 1821 – April 14, 1891) was an American politician and military leader often considered to have been the first Italian American to be elected to the United States House of Representatives, serving two terms as a representative from New York from 1887 to 1891.

He also served as a general in the Union Army during the American Civil War.

== Biography ==
Spinola was born in Old Field, near Stony Brook, Brookhaven, Suffolk County, Long Island, New York. He attended Quaker Hill Academy in Dutchess County and then passed the bar exam before establishing a law practice in Brooklyn.

=== Early political career ===
He was elected alderman of the Second Ward in Brooklyn in 1846 and 1847, and was reelected in 1849 and served for four years. By 1854, when he joined a special force known as "Special Police" to keep order in the streets of New York, he was already one of the "most respected and influential citizens" of the city. Politically a Democrat, he was a member of the New York State Assembly (Kings Co., 2nd D.) in 1856. He was a member of the New York State Senate (3rd D.) from 1858 to 1861, sitting in the 81st, 82nd, 83rd and 84th New York State Legislatures. He was a delegate to the 1860 Democratic National Convention.

He was commissioner of New York Harbor when the Civil War erupted.

=== Civil War ===
Spinola joined the volunteer army in a New York regiment and was commissioned as an officer. He was appointed brigadier general of Volunteers on October 2, 1862. He commanded two relief efforts to lift the Confederate siege of Washington, North Carolina. In July–October 1862 he recruited and organized a brigade of four regiments, known as Spinola's Empire Brigade.

Spinola assumed command of the New York "Excelsior Brigade" (the Second Brigade, Second Division, Third Army Corps), on July 11, 1863, following the Battle of Gettysburg as the Army of the Potomac strove to fill open command slots created by battle casualties. Spinola's brigade led the Union troops on July 23 at the Battle of Wapping Heights in Linden, Virginia, suffering 18 men killed, including two officers. Spinola was wounded in the fighting, along with dozens of his men. He was honorably discharged from the service in August 1865.

=== After the war ===
Following the war, Spinola was a banker and insurance agent and became an influential figure among the rapidly growing Italian immigrant community in the New York City area.

He was again a member of the State Assembly (New York Co., 16th D.) in 1877, 1881 and 1883.

=== Congress ===
He was a U.S. representative from New York's 10th district from 1887 to 1891.

== Death and burial ==
He died in office in Washington, D.C., on April 14, 1891, from pneumonia.

His funeral was held at the Immaculate Conception Church on April 16, 1891, and he was buried at Green-Wood Cemetery in Brooklyn, New York.

His estate, valued at over $1,000,000 in 1897, was left to his wife (d. 1896), and a nephew, Ferdinand McKee. In 1897 his sister Annie Douglass contested his will.

== Family ==
Spinola had his country seat at Crane Neck, Long Island. It was menaced by a fire in 1887.

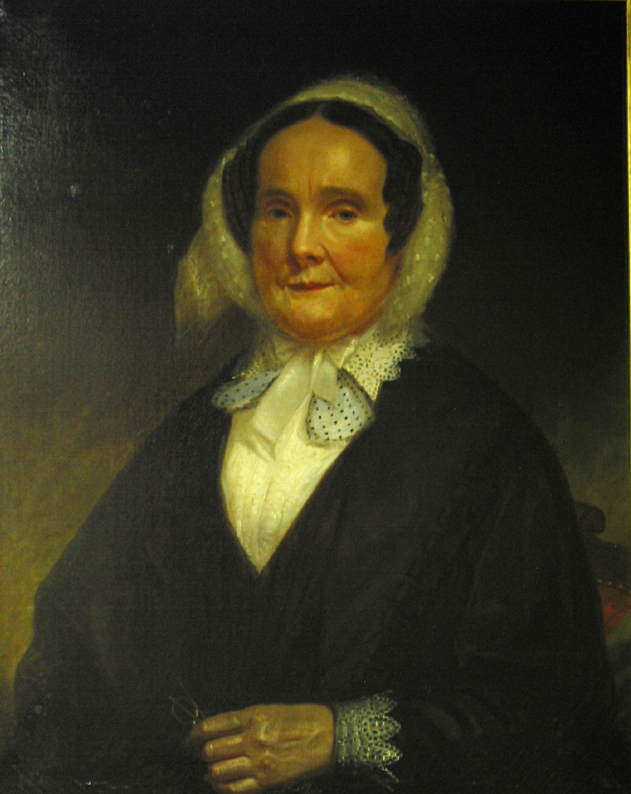
Portrait of Mrs. Eliza Spinola, mother of Gen. Spinola, commissioned to William Sidney Mount by her son in 1853

Francis Barretto Spinola was the son of João Leandro Spinola (b. 1782), later Anglicised as John Leander Spinola, a Portuguese merchant from Madeira Island, and Elizabeth Phelan (1790, Long Island – 1873), daughter of Captain John Phelan (1747, Waterford, Ireland – September 14, 1827, Baltimore, Maryland), who served in the American Revolutionary War, and his wife Susanna Davis (b. Long Island, d. 1857). João Leandro Spinola married Eliza Phelan on June 18, 1808, at Trinity Church parish, New York.

Frank W. Alduino, in his book Sons of Garibaldi in Blue and Gray: Italians in the American Civil War (p. 180), refers to his father John as a "prosperous farmer and oysterman" who migrated to the United States from Madeira Island, Portugal, whose family had originally hailed from the city of Genoa, Liguria. The Spinolas, of noble Genoese origin, moved into Madeira Island in the late 15th, early 16th century, as merchants. John Leander Spinola is recorded travelling between Funchal and New York on board of the brig Pomona in 1821. He is also recorded travelling to Havana and Rio Grande. He was buried in the Meadow Avenue of Green-Wood Cemetery, Brooklyn, New York.

His grandfather John Phelan was a lieutenant in Wigglesworth's 13th Massachusetts Regiment, and his grand-uncles Edward and Patrick were respectively captain and lieutenant at the same time. He was a member of the Order of the Cincinnati. His grand uncle Phillip Phelan joined the American forces during the Revolutionary War, where he served as lieutenant, and died at the Battle of Eutaw Springs on May 22, 1781. John Phelan's mother was Mary Heron Phelan, from Waterford, Ireland. One of her descendants, Mrs. Regina M. Knott, was one of the earliest members of the Daughters of the American Revolution.

He had an older brother, John Leander Spinola (b. 1818) who worked as a druggist, a younger brother, Douglas A. Spinola (b. 1830), an older sister, Angelina Spinola, seamstress (b. 1814), and two younger sisters, Louisa (b. 1825) and Ann Eliza (b. 1829).

Gen. Spinola provided for his sister Ann Douglass until his death in 1891. She supported herself teaching music until her eyesight failed, and by 1903, at over seventy years of age, she was living on charity, on an allowance of $120 a year from the Society of the Cincinnati. This motivated a newspaper article, pleading for help and referring her family, the Spinolas, as New York aristocrats, a "distinguished family".

Gen. Francis Spinola married Elizabeth Nancy Glazebrook, from Kings, Saratoga County, New York, at May 7, 1855, in New York City. Eliza N. Spinola, as she was known, survived her husband for five years, dying in 1896.

== See also ==
- List of American Civil War generals (Union)
- List of members of the United States Congress who died in office (1790–1899)

New York State Assembly
Preceded by George A. Searing	New York State Assembly; Kings County, 2nd District; 1856	Succeeded by Thomas Mulligan
Preceded by George Y. Whitson	New York State Assembly; New York County, 16th District; 1877	Succeeded by James Fitzgerald
Preceded by Edward P. Hagan	New York State Assembly; New York County, 16th District; 1881	Succeeded by James Edward Morrison
Preceded by James Edward Morrison	New York State Assembly; New York County, 16th District; 1883	Succeeded by Peter F. Murray
New York State Senate
Preceded by Daniel E. Sickles	New York State Senate; 3rd District; 1858–1861	Succeeded by Henry C. Murphy
U.S. House of Representatives
Preceded by Abram S. Hewitt	Member of the U.S. House of Representatives from New York's 10th congressional district 1887–1891	Succeeded by William Bourke Cockran
