= Manassas Gap =

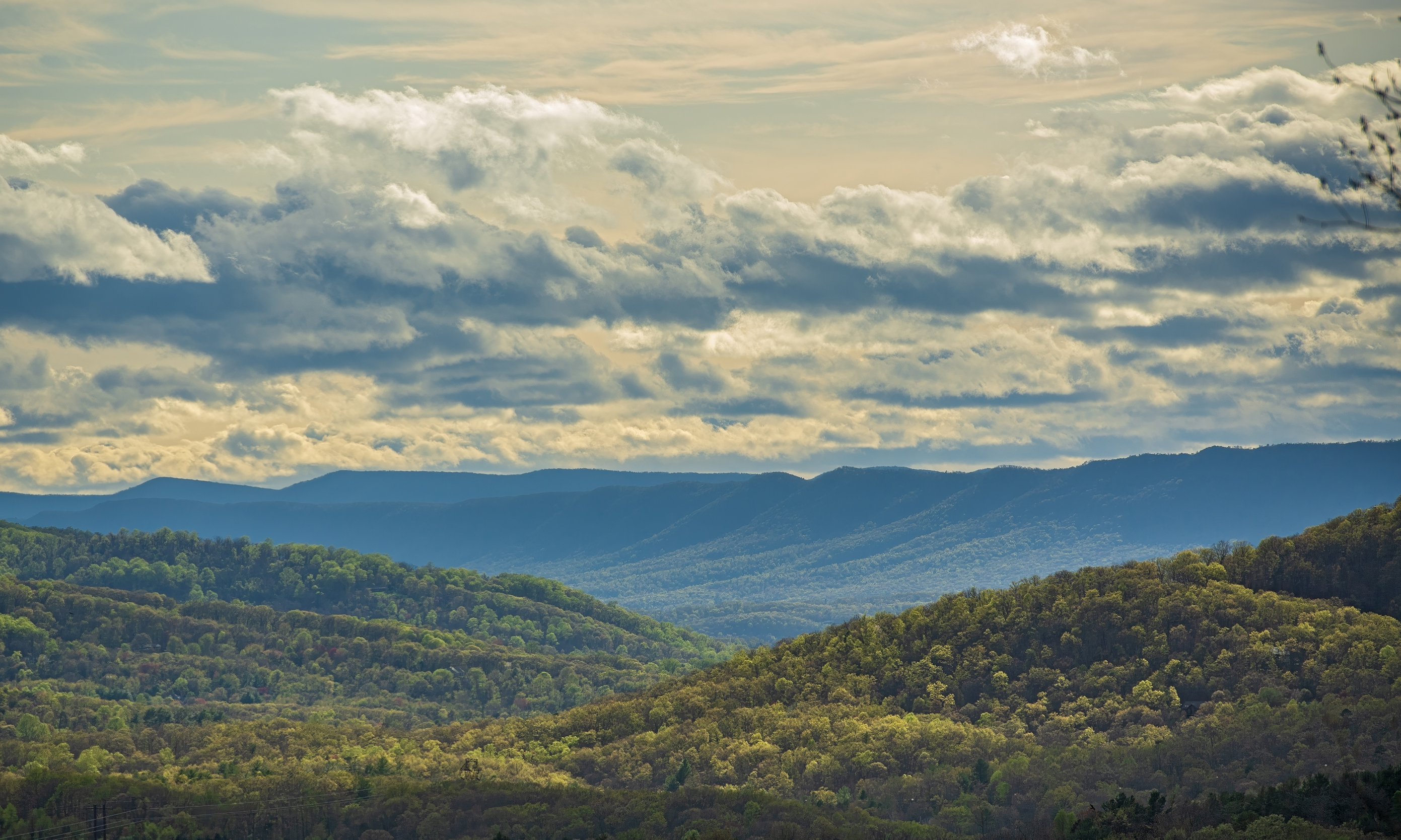
- Manassas Gap taken from Apple Mountain Lake (Linden, VA)
- Interactive map of Manassas Gap
- Elevation: 887 feet (270 m)
- Traversed by: Interstate 66; Virginia State Highway 55

Third Approach
- Location: Fauquier / Warren counties, Virginia, United States
- Range: Blue Ridge Mountains
- Coordinates: 38°54′32″N 78°04′32″W

Manassas Gap is a wind gap of the Blue Ridge Mountains on the border of Fauquier County and Warren County in Virginia. At an elevation of 887 feet above sea level, it is the lowest crossing of the Blue Ridge Mountains in the state. The origins of the name "Manassas" are undocumented.

The Manassas Gap Railroad was completed through this pass in 1854, and today, the tracks form a part of the Norfolk Southern rail system. Virginia State Route 55 and Interstate 66 also pass through Manassas Gap. In addition the north-south Appalachian Trail crosses the gap as well.

Virginia's independent cities of Manassas and Manassas Park derived their names from the railroad which was built through Manassas Gap.
