= David B. Birney =

Union Army general of the US Civil War

David Bell Birney
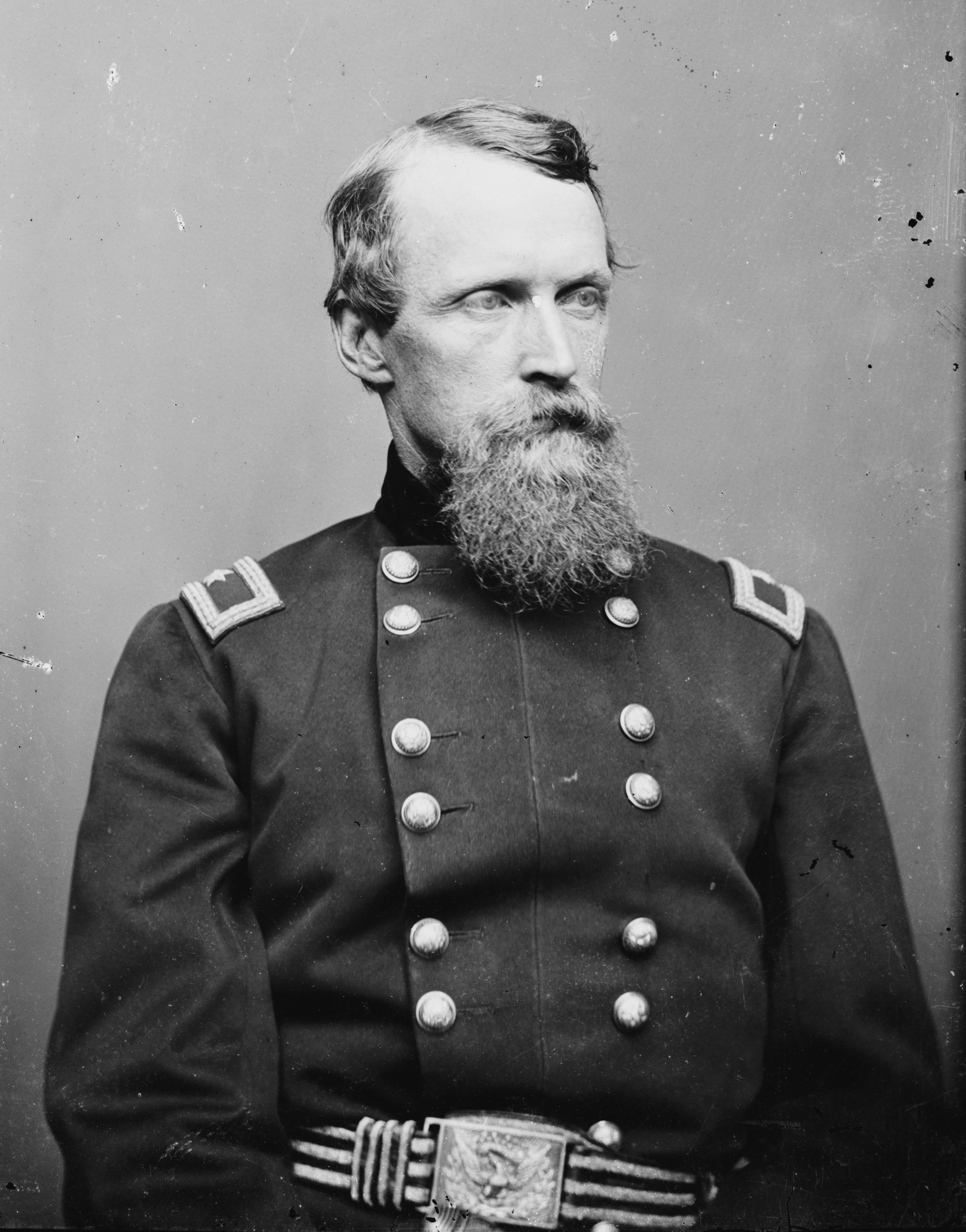
- David B. Birney
- Born: May 29, 1825; Huntsville, Alabama, US
- Died: October 18, 1864 (aged 39); Philadelphia, Pennsylvania, US
- Burial place: Woodlands Cemetery, Philadelphia, Pennsylvania
- Military career
- Allegiance: United States; Union
- Branch: United States Army; Union Army
- Service years: 1861–1864
- Rank: Major General
- Commands: X Corps
- Conflicts: American Civil War

David Bell Birney (May 29, 1825 – October 18, 1864) was a businessman, lawyer, and a Union general in the American Civil War.

== Early life ==
Birney was born in Huntsville, Alabama, the son of an abolitionist from Kentucky, James G. Birney. The Birney family returned to Kentucky in 1833, and James Birney freed his slaves. In 1835, the family moved to Cincinnati, where the father published an anti-slavery newspaper. Following numerous threats from pro-slavery mobs, the family moved again to Michigan, and finally to Philadelphia.

Following his graduation from Phillips Academy, Andover, Massachusetts, David Birney entered business, studied law, and was admitted to the bar. He returned to Philadelphia, practicing law from 1856 until the outbreak of the Civil War.

== Civil War ==
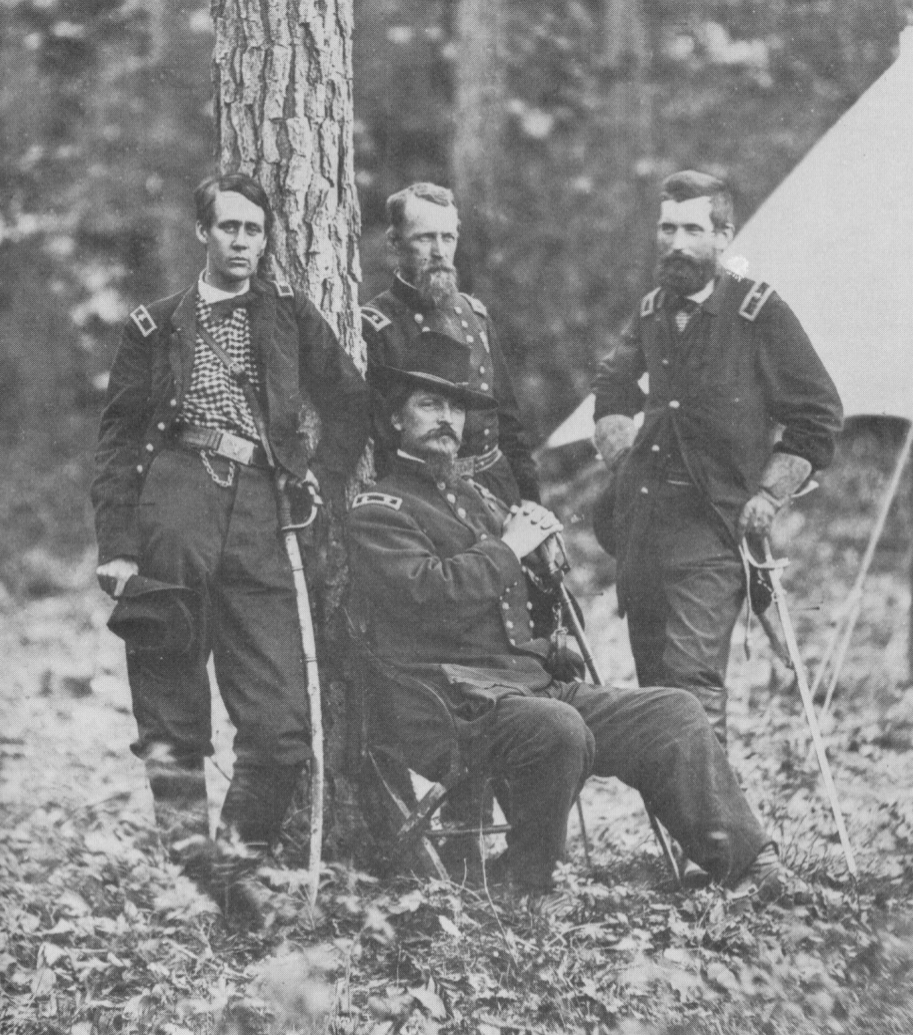
Birney (center standing), with his II corps commander Hancock and fellow division commanders Barlow and Gibbon during the Wilderness campaign

Birney entered the Union army just after Fort Sumter as lieutenant colonel of the 23rd Pennsylvania Volunteer Infantry, a unit he raised largely at his own expense. Just prior to the war he had been studying military texts in preparation for such a role. He was promoted to colonel on August 31, 1861, and to brigadier general on February 17, 1862, clearly benefiting from political influences, not military merit. He commanded a brigade in Brig. Gen. Philip Kearny's division of the III Corps, which he led through the Peninsula Campaign. At the Battle of Seven Pines he was accused of disobeying an order from his corps commander, Maj. Gen. Samuel P. Heintzelman, allegedly for "halting his command a mile from the enemy." But this was simply a matter of orders misunderstood. Birney was court-martialed, but with strong positive testimony from Kearny, he was acquitted and restored to command.

Birney then led his brigade in the Seven Days Battles, primarily at Glendale. He fought at the Second Battle of Bull Run in support of Maj. Gen. John Pope's Army of Virginia, and at the Battle of Chantilly immediately following. When Kearny was killed in that battle, Birney took over command of his division. Stationed in Washington, D.C., he missed the Battle of Antietam, but his division returned to the Army of the Potomac to fight at Fredericksburg. There, he once again encountered military discipline problems, this time for allegedly refusing to support Maj. Gen. George G. Meade's division's attack on the left flank of the Union line. However, he was complimented in III Corps commander Maj. Gen. George Stoneman's official report for "the handsome manner in which he handled his division" on that same day and for a second time he escaped punishment. Birney led his division in heavy fighting at Chancellorsville, where they suffered more casualties (1,607) than any other division in the army. As a result of his distinguished service at Chancellorsville, he was promoted to major general on May 20, 1863.

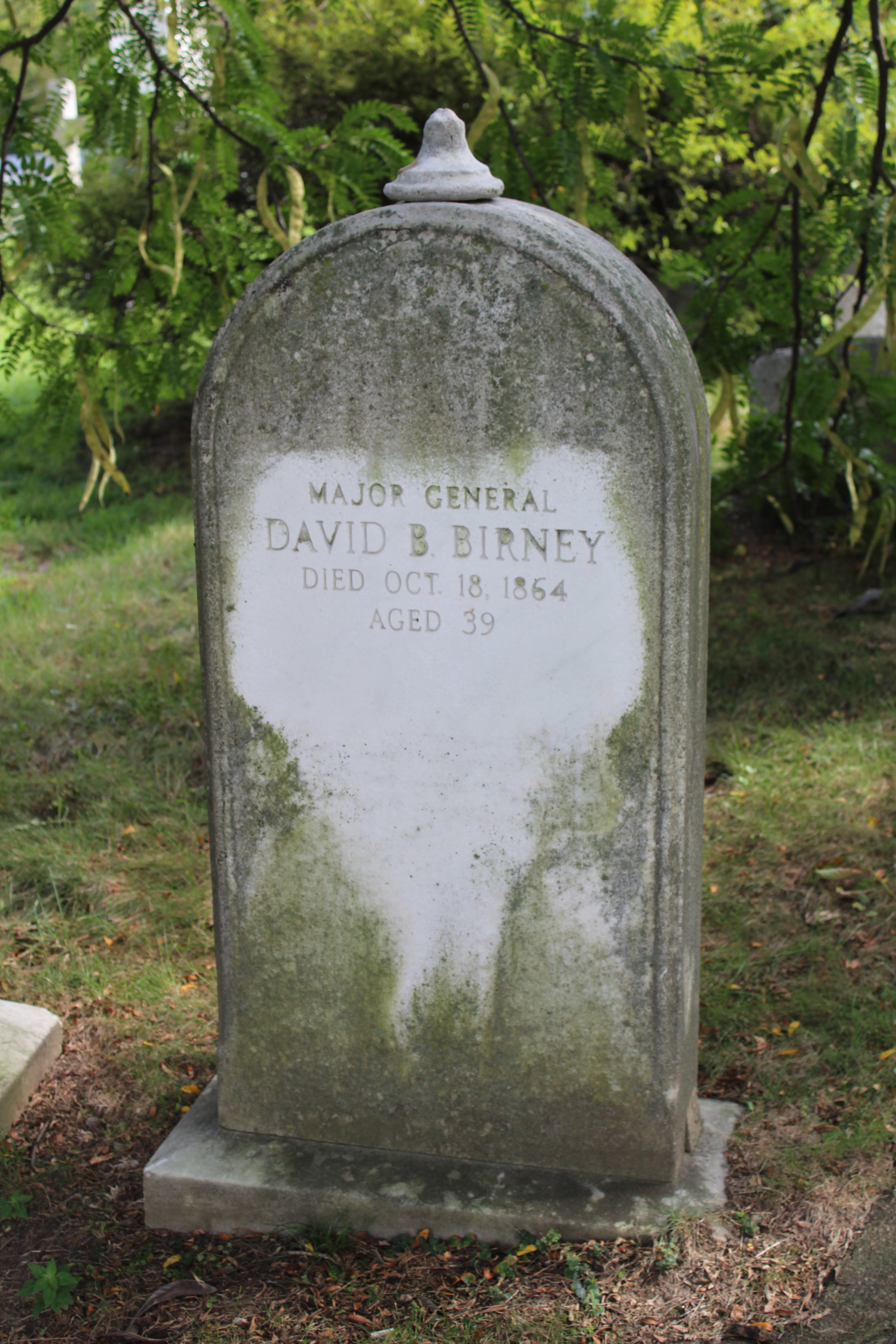
David B. Birney grave at the Woodlands Cemetery

At the Battle of Gettysburg, III Corps commander Daniel Sickles pulled his troops out of line, creating an isolated, exposed salient in the Union line. The Confederate divisions of John B. Hood and Lafayette McLaws slammed into the III Corps, and Birney's division, hit on three sides, was completely demolished in the fighting with severe casualties. As Birney watched the few survivors of his division gather about him on Cemetery Ridge, he whispered to one of his officers, "I wish I were already dead." Sickles had his leg shattered by an artillery shell and Birney assumed temporary command of the corps, despite having received two minor wounds himself. Birney was in temporary command of the III Corps for a few days after Gettysburg, when the more senior General William H. French was named permanent commander. French quickly gained notoriety for his inept handling of the III Corps, and unlike Birney, he was an outsider to the corps and unpopular with the soldiers.

Birney started in the Overland Campaign as a division commander in the II Corps, his III Corps having been reorganized out of existence that spring. After good service in the Wilderness, Spotsylvania Court House (where he was wounded by a shell fragment), and Cold Harbor battles, on July 23, 1864, Lt. Gen. Ulysses S. Grant gave Birney command of the X Corps in the Army of the James. During the Siege of Petersburg, Birney became ill with diarrhea. At first, this was a minor complaint and he was able to remain in command, but in September his health started to get worse. However, Birney was reluctant to take a leave of absence and so tried to remain on duty. On October 7, he was so sick that he had to be transported in an ambulance. The corps medical director requested that Birney be sent home at once, and he was taken to Philadelphia, where he became delirious. The doctors diagnosed his condition as typhomalaria, and he died on October 18 after experiencing uncontrollable gastrointestinal bleeding. The exact cause of Birney's death has been speculated to be typhoid fever. He was buried in Woodlands Cemetery.

His older brother, William, was also a Union general.

== Legacy ==
David Birney was one of the more successful "political generals" of the Civil War. Many of his colleagues resented his swift rise in the ranks and he was not a beloved figure with them or his soldiers. Theodore Lyman of Meade's staff wrote of Birney:

He was a pale, Puritanical figure, with a demeanor of unmoveable coldness; only he would smile politely when you spoke to him. He was spare in person, with a thin face, light-blue eye, and sandy hair. As a General he took very good care of his Staff and saw they got due promotion. He was a man, too, who looked out for his own interests sharply and knew the mainspring of military advancement. His unpopularity among some persons arose partly from his own promotion, which, however, he deserved, and partly from his cold covert manner.

— Theodore Lyman

The Gen. David B. Birney School, a Philadelphia public school named in Birney's honor, was built in 1912–1913. The building was added to the National Register of Historic Places in 1988.

== See also ==
- List of American Civil War generals (Union)

== Notes ==
Military offices
Preceded by Daniel E. Sickles	Commander of the III Corps (Army of the Potomac); May 29, 1863 – June 3, 1863	Succeeded by Daniel E. Sickles
Preceded by Daniel E. Sickles	Commander of the III Corps (Army of the Potomac); July 2, 1863 – July 7, 1863	Succeeded by William H. French
Preceded by William H. French	Commander of the III Corps (Army of the Potomac); January 28, 1864 – February 17, 1864	Succeeded by William H. French
Preceded by Winfield S. Hancock	Commander of the II Corps (Army of the Potomac); June 18, 1864 – June 27, 1864	Succeeded by Winfield S. Hancock
