= III Corps (Union army) =

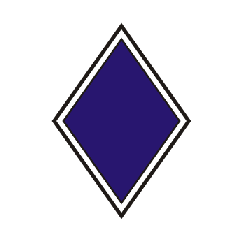
- III Corps badge
- Active: 1862–1864
- Country: United States of America
- Branch: Union Army
- Type: Army Corps
- Size: Corps
- Part of: Army of the Potomac
- Engagements: American Civil War: Peninsula Campaign; Yorktown; Battle of Williamsburg; Battle of Fair Oaks; Seven Days Battles; Battle of Oak Grove; Battle of Glendale; Battle of Malvern Hill; Battle of Fredericksburg; Battle of Chancellorsville; Battle of Gettysburg; Mine Run Campaign

Commanders
- Notable commanders: Daniel E. Sickles

Insignia
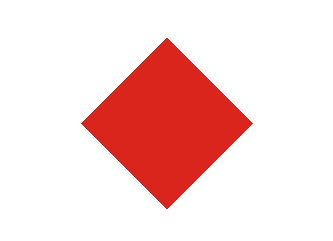
- 1st Division

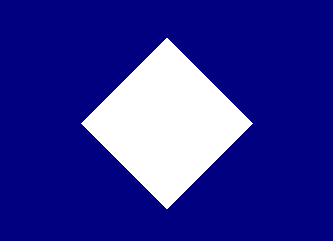
- 2nd Division

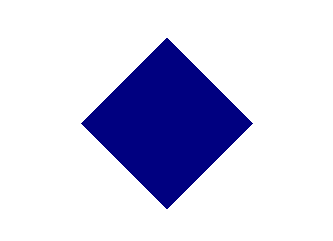
- 3rd Division

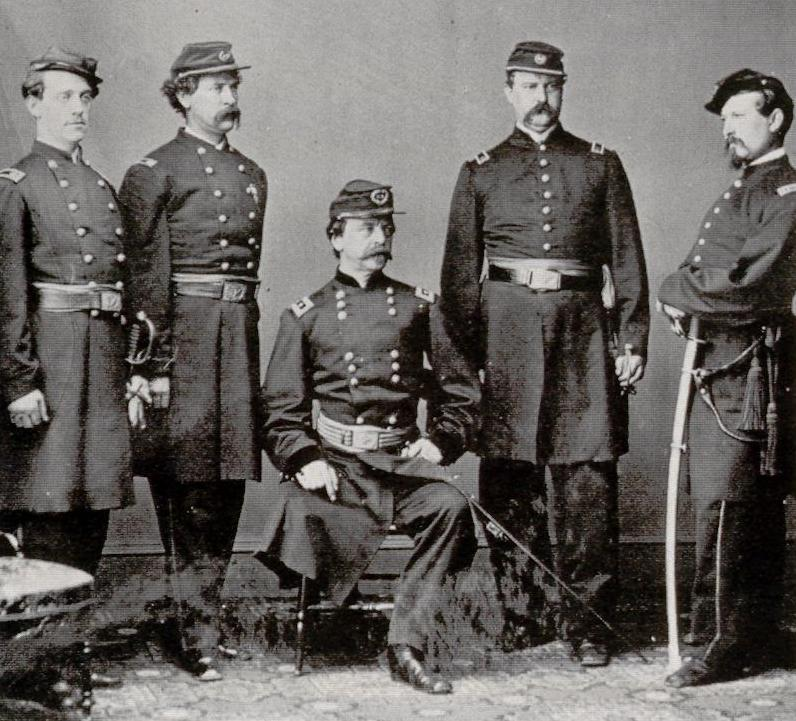
Daniel Sickles and staff after the Battle of Gettysburg

There were four formations in the Union Army designated as III Corps (or Third Army Corps) during the American Civil War.

Three were short-lived:

- In the Army of Virginia, a temporary designation of the command better known as I Corps (Army of the Potomac):
  - Irvin McDowell (June 26 – September 5, 1862);
  - James B. Ricketts (September 5–6, 1862);
  - Joseph Hooker (September 6–12, 1862)
- In the Army of the Ohio:
  - Charles C. Gilbert (September 29 – October 24, 1862)
- In the Army of the Cumberland:
  - Charles C. Gilbert (October 24 – November 5, 1862)

The other, the III Corps, Army of the Potomac (March 13, 1862 – March 24, 1864), is the subject of this article.

== Corps history ==
The III Corps included in its organization the famous Kearny Division; also, Hooker's Division, the Excelsior Brigade, the Second Jersey Brigade, and other well known commands. Its record is closely interwoven with the history of the Virginia campaigns of 1862–1863, in which it fought during two years.

=== Peninsula campaign: March–July 1862 ===
The Corps was organized March 13, 1862, commanded by Major General Samuel P. Heintzelman, with Generals Joseph Hooker, Charles S. Hamilton, and Fitz John Porter as its three division commanders. It was immediately ordered to join the Peninsula Campaign, Hamilton's Division embarking on March 17, and leading the advance of the Army of the Potomac on that memorable campaign. During the siege of Yorktown the corps was at its maximum, the morning reports of April 30 showing an aggregate of 39,710, with 64 pieces of light artillery, and 34,633 reported as "present for duty". But this aggregate was maintained only briefly, as Porter's Division was taken away soon after to form part of the newly organized V Corps. Hamilton was relieved on April 30, and General Philip Kearny took his place, Hamilton assuming a division command in the Army of the Mississippi.

Upon the evacuation of Yorktown, the III Corps led the pursuit of the retreating enemy, attacking them at Williamsburg on May 5, with Hooker's and Kearny's Divisions. This battle was fought almost entirely by the III Corps; of the 2,239 casualties on that field, 2,002 occurred within its ranks; and three-fourths of them in Hooker's Division, the brunt of the battle having fallen on the Excelsior Brigade and Jersey Brigade, both in Hooker's command. Porter's Division was not engaged, having been left at Yorktown; on May 18, the new V Corps was created with Porter in command, his old division was detached from the III Corps to serve in the new outfit, leaving only two divisions, Hooker's and Kearny's, in the corps, and reducing its aggregate strength to 23,331 present and absent, with 34 pieces of field artillery. The two divisions numbered about 17,000 effectives, out of the 18,205 reported as "present for duty".

At Fair Oaks, its next battle, 209 were killed, 945 wounded, and 91 missing, principally Charles D. Jameson's and Hiram G. Berry's Brigades of Kearny's Division. Five fresh regiments joined in June, increasing its report of June 20 to 27,474 "present and absent", of whom 18,428 were reported "present for duty, equipped"; this included eight batteries of light artillery, of 40 guns. After deducting the large number of non-combatants and detailed men that are included in the "present for duty", the corps probably numbered at this time about 17,000 effectives, available in case of action.

The corps made the opening fight in the Seven Days Battles, at Oak Grove, June 25, fighting again at Glendale on June 30, and at Malvern Hill on July 1; its losses in these engagements aggregated 158 killed, 1,021 wounded, and 794 missing; total, 1,973. The heaviest loss occurred in John C. Robinson's Brigade of Kearny's Division; the 1st New York, Berry's Brigade, also encountered a hot fire at Glendale.

=== Northern Virginia campaign: July–September 1862 ===
Upon the withdrawal from the front of Richmond, the III Corps accompanied the Army of the Potomac to Manassas, where it was sent to reinforce John Pope's Army of Virginia. The corps left Harrison's Bar on August 14, and, marching to Yorktown, embarked on August 20 for Alexandria. It arrived at Warrenton Junction on August 26, and on the following day the Excelsior Brigade had a sharp fight at Bristoe Station. On August 29, the corps was engaged at Groveton. Cuvier Grover's Brigade, of Hooker's Division, fought desperately at the railroad embankment, in which the use of bayonets and clubbed muskets was officially reported. On the September 1, Kearny's Division was engaged at Chantilly, Birney's Brigade taking a prominent part; Kearny was killed in this action. The losses of the corps at Manassas, including Bristoe, Groveton, and Chantilly, amounted to 260 killed, 1,525 wounded, and 453 missing; total, 2,238, including Phil Kearny, who was shot dead by Confederate troops at Chantilly. Hooker's Division numbered fully 10,000 men at Yorktown, and received a reinforcement of about 3,000 more; after Manassas, it drew rations at Fairfax Station for only 2,400 men.

=== Fredericksburg: November–December 1862 ===
After Second Bull Run, the III Corps was severely understrength and so during the Maryland Campaign in September, it was left behind in Washington DC to rest and refit. In October, Samuel Heintzelman was removed from command. In November it rejoined the Army of the Potomac, now under Ambrose Burnside, then on its way to Fredericksburg, and arriving at Falmouth on November 24, encamped there until the battle of December 13. In the meantime, General Hooker had been promoted to the command of the Center Grand Division, composed of the III and V Corps; General George Stoneman had been assigned to the command of the III Corps; General Birney to that of the 1st Division; General Daniel E. Sickles to the 2nd Division; and a third division comprising nine month regiments under General Amiel W. Whipple had been added. The corps was not prominently engaged at Fredericksburg, although under a heavy fire; still, its casualties amounted to 145 killed, 837 wounded, and 202 missing; total 1,184, over half of which occurred in J.H. Hobart Ward's Brigade of Birney's Division. After the battle the corps returned to its quarters at Falmouth, where it spent the winter of 1862–1863. General Sickles was promoted to the command of the corps, and General Hiram Berry to that of Sickles's Division.

=== Chancellorsville & Gettysburg: May–July 1863 ===
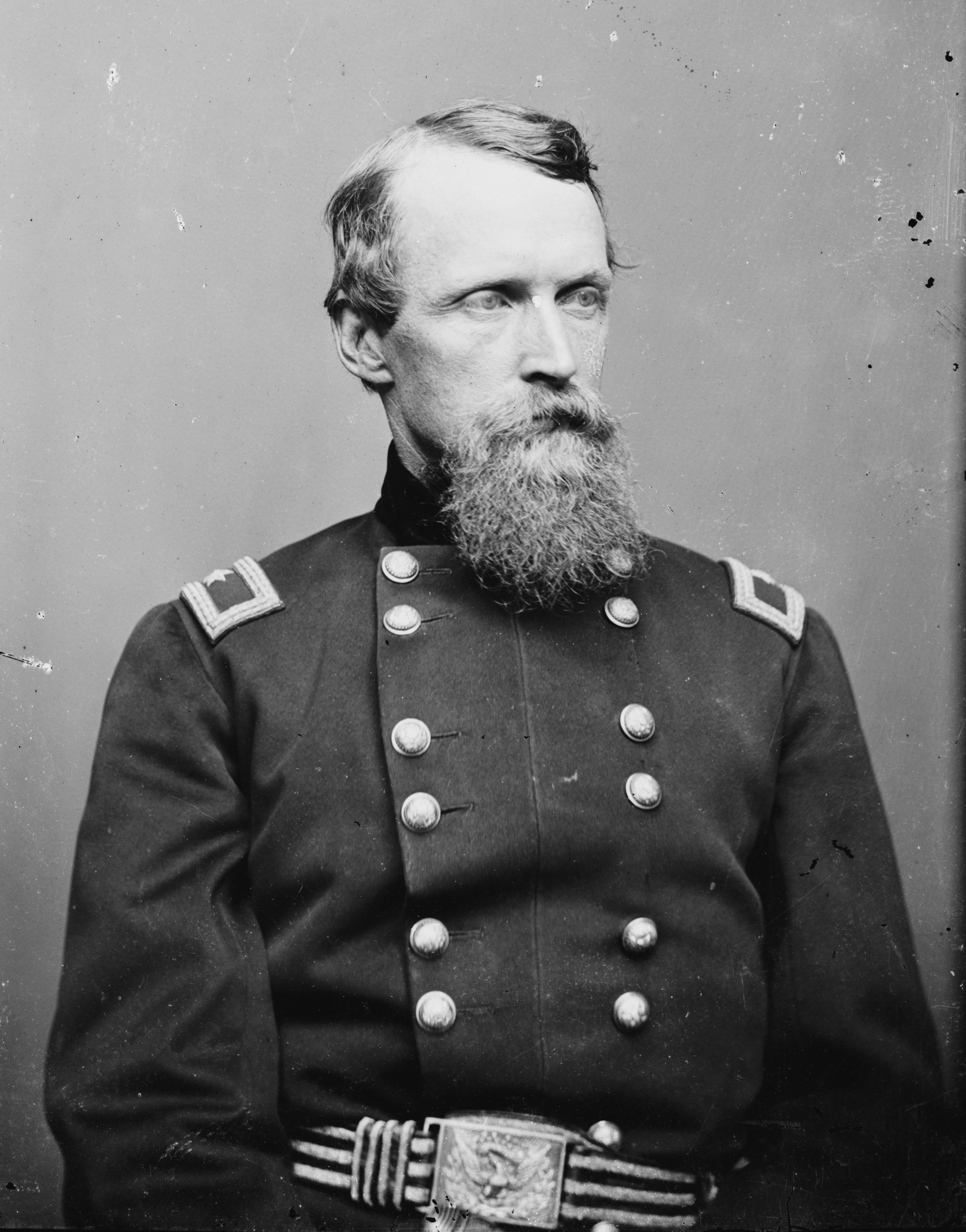
Maj. Gen. David B. Birney

On May 1, 1863, the corps broke camp and marched to Chancellorsville, an eventful field in its history; a battle in which the brunt of the fighting fell on the III and XII Corps. It took 17,568 men, including non-combatants, on that campaign, losing 378 killed, 2,634 wounded, and 1,090 missing; total 4,102. Generals Berry and Whipple were among those killed.

The depleted ranks were still further lessened by the loss of four New York regiments whose two years term of enlistment had expired; in addition, the division of nine month troops had gone home. The corps was accordingly consolidated into two divisions; the 1st under General David B. Birney, and the 2nd under General Andrew A. Humphreys, an able officer who had distinguished himself as a division commander at Fredericksburg.

At Gettysburg, the corps took a prominent part in the battle of the second day, July 2, 1863. Acting against orders, General Sickles moved the corps from its assigned defensive position on Cemetery Ridge to an indefensible position about a mile forward, centered on the Peach Orchard. Sickles wanted to occupy the slightly higher ground there, but the corps was forced to defend a salient that was too long for its size. When it was attacked by two Confederate divisions, it was virtually demolished and had to be reinforced throughout the day from other corps. It did exact a fearful price from its assailants, however. Its losses at Gettysburg were 578 killed, 3,026 wounded, and 606 missing; total, 4,210 out of less than 10,000 actually engaged. The morning report showed 11,924 present for duty equipped. General Sickles was seriously wounded, losing a leg; he left the corps and active military service, and General Birney succeeded temporarily to the command.

=== Autumn 1863 ===
On July 14, the battered III Corps was strengthened by the addition of Maj. Gen William H. French's Harper's Ferry garrison. General French was assigned to the command of the corps. During the pursuit of Lee, after Gettysburg, a part of the corps was engaged at the Battle of Manassas Heights at in the Wapping Heights near Linden, Virginia on July 23, an action in which the Excelsior Brigade was prominently engaged. Another minor affair occurred at Kelly's Ford, Virginia, November 7, 1863, in which some regiments of Birney's (1st) Division were under fire.

In the Mine Run Campaign a sharp fight took place at Locust Grove, Virginia, in which Joseph B. Carr's (3rd) Division sustained considerable loss, the principal part of the casualties in that campaign occurring in the III Corps. At this time General French was still in command of the corps, with Generals Birney, Henry Prince, and Carr in command of the divisions. Upon the return from Mine Run, the corps went into winter quarters at Brandy Station.

=== Army reorganization: March 1864 ===
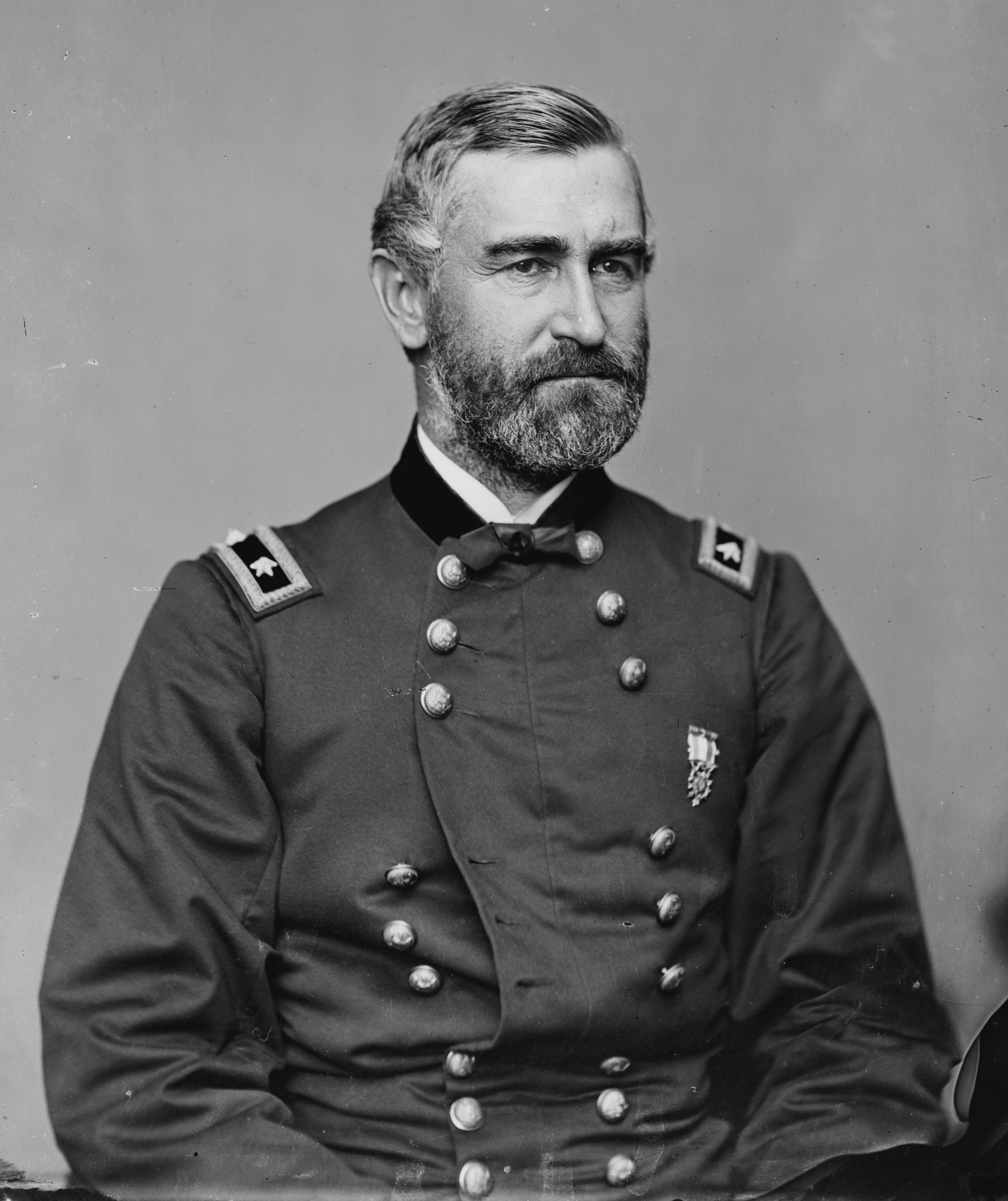
Brig. Gen. Gershom Mott

On March 23, 1864, the War Department ordered the discontinuance of the III and I Corps; and the amalgamation of the constituent units of the two corps with the II, V and VI Corps. This order was much resented by many of the troops; as a result of the resulting discontent, former soldiers of I and III Corps were permitted to wear their old corps insignia as cap badges. The decision to discontinue the III Corps was motivated by several factors including a desire to simplify the Army of the Potomac's command structure and due to the ineptitude of General French, who was otherwise extremely difficult to get rid of due to his seniority.

The 1st and 2nd Divisions were transferred to the II Corps, and, with Generals Birney and Gershom Mott in command, became respectively the 3rd and 4th Divisions of that corps. The fourth division was incorporated into the third at the Battle of Spotsylvania, and Mott became one of Birney's brigade commanders. The 3rd Division was transferred to the VI Corps, where, under command of General James B. Ricketts, it became the 3rd Division of that corps.

== Command history ==
Samuel P. Heintzelman	March 13 – October 30, 1862
George Stoneman	October 30, 1862 – February 5, 1863
Daniel E. Sickles	February 5 – May 29, 1863
David B. Birney	May 29 – June 3, 1863
Daniel E. Sickles	June 3 – July 2, 1863
David B. Birney	July 2–7, 1863
William H. French	July 7, 1863 – January 28, 1864
David B. Birney	January 28 – February 17, 1864
William H. French	February 17 – March 24, 1864
