= Battle of Manassas Gap =

Battle of the American Civil War

Coordinates: 38.914°N 78.114°W

- Part of the American Civil War
Date	July 23, 1863
Location	Warren County, Virginia
Result	Inconclusive

Belligerents
United States (Union)	(Confederate States of America) CSA (Confederacy)

Commanders and leaders
William H. French; Francis B. Spinola	Richard H. Anderson

Strength
Unknown amount of Corps	Unknown amount of Brigades

Casualties and losses
- 440

The Battle of Manassas Gap, also known as the Battle of Wapping Heights, took place on July 23, 1863, in Warren County, Virginia, at the conclusion of General Robert E. Lee's retreat back to Virginia in the final days of the Gettysburg campaign of the American Civil War. Union forces attempted to force passage across the Blue Ridge Mountains and attack the Confederate rear as it formed a defensive position in the upper Shenandoah Valley. Despite successfully forcing the passage at Manassas Gap, the Union force was unable to do so before Lee retreated further up the valley to safety, resulting in an inconclusive battle.

== Background ==
Following their defeat at the Battle of Gettysburg, Lee's Confederate Army of Northern Virginia retreated across the Potomac River at Williamsport, Maryland, and withdrew into the Shenandoah Valley. Maj. Gen. George G. Meade's Army of the Potomac, in pursuit of Lee's army, decided to try to flank the Confederate army by crossing the river east of the Blue Ridge Mountains at Harpers Ferry and Berlin, Maryland, into the Loudoun Valley and then forcing a passage across the Blue Ridge in Lee's rear. To this end, on July 23, Meade ordered the III Corps, under Maj. Gen. William H. French, to cut off the retreating Confederate columns at Front Royal, Virginia, by forcing passage through Manassas Gap.

== Battle ==
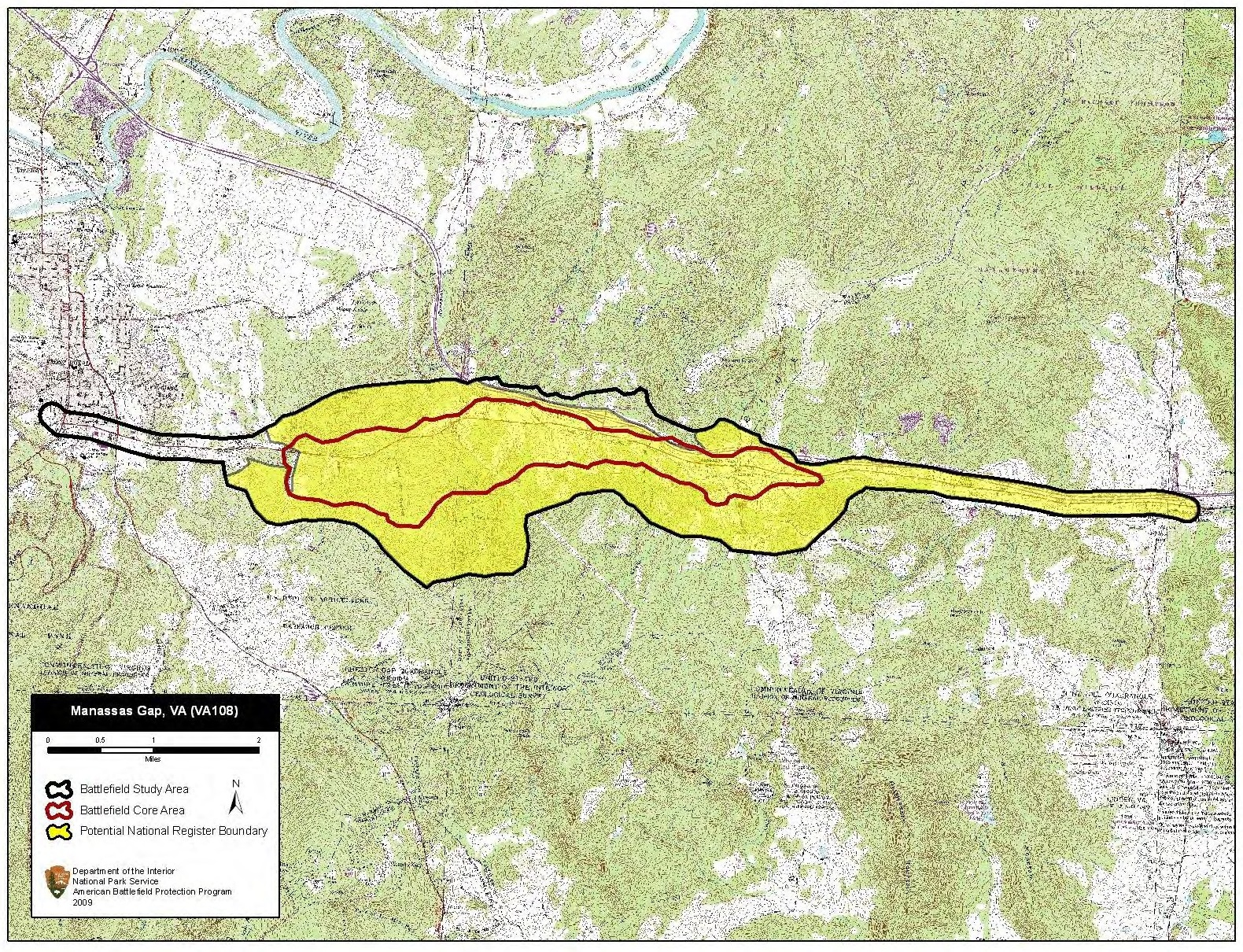
Map of Manassas Gap Battlefield core and study areas by the American Battlefield Protection Program

At dawn, French began his attack with the New York Excelsior Brigade, led by Brig. Gen. Francis B. Spinola, against Brig. Gen. Ambrose R. Wright's brigade of Georgians, under the command of Col. Edward J. Walker of the 3rd Georgia Regiment, defending the pass. The fight was slow at first, with the superior Union force using its numbers to push Walker from his defensive position back through the gap. In the late afternoon, around 4:30 p.m., French made a concerted assault on Walker's brigade, driving them from the gap. The Confederates were quickly reinforced by Col Edward Asbury O'Neal's Brigade and artillery of Col Thomas Henry Carter, which stalled the Union advance. By dusk, the Union attack became uncoordinated and was abandoned. During the night, Confederate forces withdrew into the Luray Valley. On July 24, the Union army occupied Front Royal, but Lee's army was safely beyond pursuit.

== Aftermath ==
The small fight was inconclusive. The Union army was able to successfully gain passage through the gap in the Blue Ridge and occupy Front Royal, but not before Lee was able to withdraw further up the valley to safety. By failing to cut off the Confederate retreat and bring Lee into battle, the Army of Northern Virginia was allowed to reorganize and regroup. By the end of the summer both armies had taken their familiar positions opposite the Rappahannock and Rapidan rivers, setting the stage for the Bristoe and Mine Run campaigns in the fall.
