= William H. French =

American military officer (1815–1881)

William Henry French
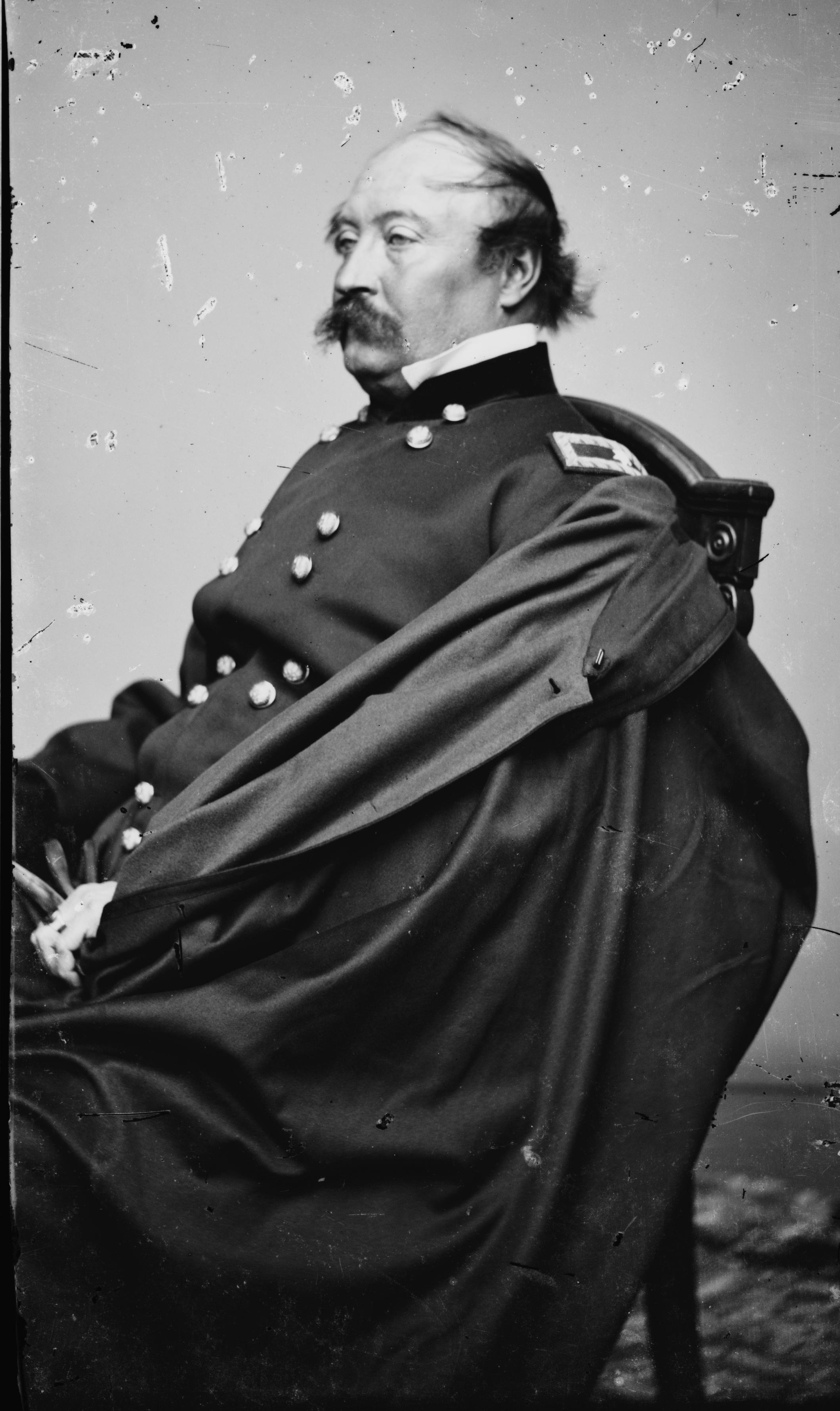
- General William Henry French
- Born: January 13, 1815; Baltimore, Maryland, U.S.
- Died: May 20, 1881 (aged 66); Washington, D.C., U.S.
- Burial place: Rock Creek Cemetery; Washington, D.C., U.S.
- Military career
- Allegiance: United States (Union)
- Branch: United States Army; Union Army
- Service years: 1837–1880
- Rank: Major General
- Commands: III Corps
- Conflicts: Second Seminole War; Mexican–American War; Battle of Veracruz; Battle of Contreras; Battle of Churubusco; American Civil War; Battle of Yorktown (1862); Battle of Seven Pines; Battle of Oak Grove; Battle of Gaines' Mill; Battle of Garnett's & Golding's Farm; Battle of Savage's Station; Battle of Glendale; Battle of Malvern Hill; Battle of Antietam; Battle of Fredericksburg; Battle of Chancellorsville; Battle of Gettysburg; Battle of Mine Run

William Henry French (January 13, 1815 – May 20, 1881) was a career United States Army officer and a Union Army General in the American Civil War. He rose to temporarily command a corps within the Army of the Potomac, but was relieved of active field duty following poor performance by his command during the Mine Run Campaign in late 1863. He remained in the Army and went on to command several Army installations before his retirement in 1880.

== Early life and career ==
William H. French was born in Baltimore. He graduated from the United States Military Academy in 1837 and was commissioned a second lieutenant in the 1st U.S. Artillery. He briefly served in the Second Seminole War and was then assigned to garrison duty along the Canada–US border from late 1837 through 1838, when he was reassigned to other military posts for the next decade.

During the Mexican–American War, French was aide-de-camp to General Franklin Pierce, and also on the staff of General Robert Patterson. He was engaged in the siege of Vera Cruz, and received two brevet promotions for bravery: to captain for Cerro Gordo and to major for Contreras and Churubusco.

Between 1850 and 1852, he again served against the Seminole Indians in Florida and was the commanding officer of Stonewall Jackson. The two disagreed often and French's assignment with Jackson led to the two filing numerous charges against each other with U.S. Army authorities. After Florida, French served on frontier duty until 1861.

He was the co-author of Instruction for Field Artillery (1860), along with William F. Barry and Henry J. Hunt.

== Civil War ==
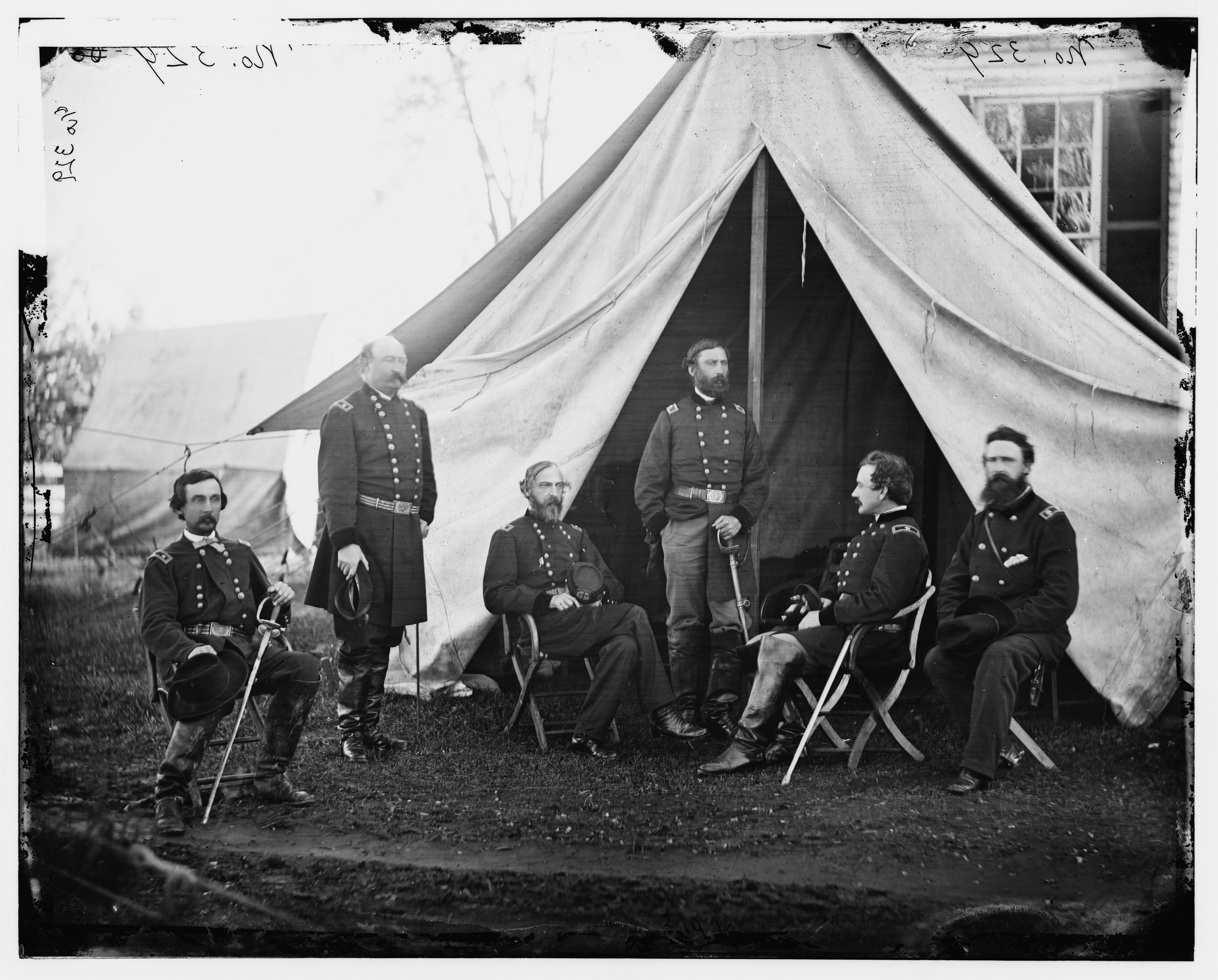
Commanders of the Army of the Potomac, Gouverneur K. Warren, William H. French, George G. Meade, Henry J. Hunt, Andrew A. Humphreys and George Sykes in September 1863

At the start of the Civil War, Captain French and the 1st U.S. Artillery were stationed at Fort Duncan, Eagle Pass, Texas. He refused to surrender his garrison to the Confederate-aligned state authorities as they requested. Instead, he moved his men to the mouth of the Río Grande in sixteen days and sailed to Key West, where he quartered at the Federal military post there, Fort Zachary Taylor. Shortly thereafter, he was elevated to major and assumed command of the base. In conjunction with the Union Navy, he was instrumental in shutting off Key West to slave traders.

He was promoted to brigadier general of volunteers as of September 28, 1861, and was assigned to the Army of the Potomac, where he commanded a brigade of the II Corps in the Peninsula Campaign. He was engaged at the battles of Yorktown, Seven Pines, Oak Grove, Gaines' Mill, Garnett's & Golding's Farm, Savage's Station, Glendale, and Malvern Hill. French received praise in official reports for his actions and leadership, and was promoted to command a division during the Northern Virginia Campaign.

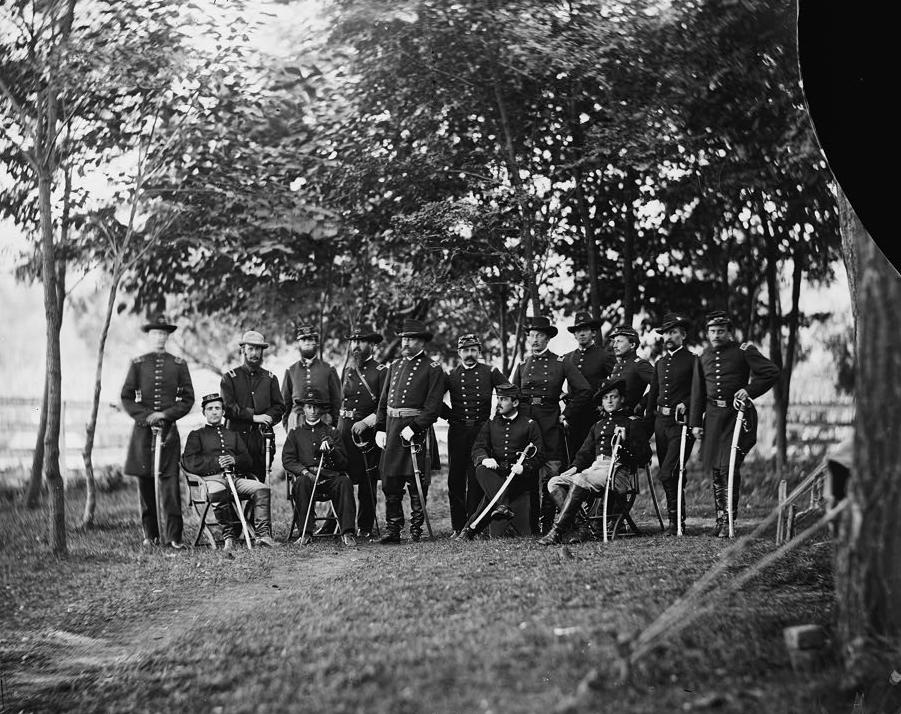
General William H. French and staff in September 1863

French commanded the 3rd Division of the II Corps at the Battle of Antietam, making the first attack on Confederate units in the Sunken Road. He was promoted to major general on November 29, 1862. He led his division in the battles of Fredericksburg and Chancellorsville.

French commanded elements of the VIII Corps and the District of Harpers Ferry during the Gettysburg campaign, but shortly after Maj. Gen. Daniel E. Sickles was wounded at the Battle of Gettysburg, French assumed command of the battered III Corps. His military reputation was ruined during the Mine Run Campaign in November 1863 when Maj. Gen. George G. Meade claimed that French's corps moved too slowly to exploit a potential advantage over Gen. Robert E. Lee. This engagement was the last for the III Corps, which was reorganized out of the Union Army in the spring of 1864, and French was mustered out of volunteer service on May 6, 1864.

He remained in the regular army, and for the remainder of the war, he served on military boards in Washington, D.C. French ended the war with the regular army rank of colonel of the 4th U.S. Artillery.

== Postbellum career ==
Following the war, French commanded the 2nd Artillery on the Pacific Coast from 1865 until 1872, including an assignment as commander of Fort McDowell in San Francisco Bay. In 1875, he was appointed the commander of Fort McHenry near Baltimore. In July 1880, at his own request, being over sixty-two years of age, he was retired.

French died in Washington, D.C., and is buried there in Rock Creek Cemetery.

== Family ==
He married Caroline Read (1820–1884). They had six children: Frank French (1842–1865), William H. French (1844–1923), Anna French Clem (1852–1899), Frederick French (1855–1906), George French (1857–1895), and Rosalie French Conklin (1861–1891).

His grandson, John French Conklin (1891–1973), was also a graduate of the U.S. Military Academy and a brigadier general in the United States Army.

French's daughter Anna was the wife of John Clem.

== See also ==
- List of American Civil War generals (Union)

== Notes ==
Military offices
Preceded by David B. Birney	Commander of the III Corps (Army of the Potomac); July 7, 1863 – January 28, 1864	Succeeded by David B. Birney
Preceded by David B. Birney	Commander of the III Corps (Army of the Potomac); February 17, 1864 – March 24, 1864	Succeeded by Command absorbed into II Corps (Army of the Potomac) and VI Corps (Army of the Potomac)
