= Boody =

Boody may refer to:

== People ==
- Boody Gilbertson (1922–2015), American professional basketball player
- Boody Rogers (1904–1996), American comic strip and comic book cartoonist
- Azariah Boody (1815–1885), American politician and a member of the United States House of Representatives from New York
- David A. Boody (1837–1930), American politician and a United States Representative from New York
- Meghan Boody (born 1964), surrealist photographer
- Robert Boody (1836–1913), American Civil War soldier

== Other ==
- Boody, Illinois, an unincorporated census-designated place (CDP) in Illinois, United States
- David A. Boody (fireboat), fireboat built for the Brooklyn Fire Department and in service from 1892 to 1914
- Henry Boody House (also known as Boody-Johnson House), historic house in Maine, United States
