= George B. Carse =

American politician (died 1883)

George B. Carse (died 1883) was an American politician in Florida. He was from New Jersey. He served during the Reconstruction era and was referred to as a "carpetbagger" by opponents.

He served in the Union Army during the American Civil War. Honored as a war hero and after being saved by Robert Boody, he served in Florida administering contracts between former slaves and white plantation owners. He became politically active and assisted African Americans in registering to vote. He was appointed Adjutant General by Governor Harrison Reed. He was involved in contentious political dispute and twice held a revolver to political opponents who were attempting to seize documents. He eventually returned to New Jersey and served in its Assembly, edited a newspaper, and studied law. He also served as a general in the New Jersey National Guard.

While a Bureau Agent in Lexington he sent a telegrams about the escape of the murderer of a freedman.

== See also ==
- List of American Civil War Medal of Honor recipients: A–F
