= 87th New York Infantry Regiment =

- Active: November 14, 1861 – September 6, 1862
- Country: United States
- Allegiance: Union
- Branch: Infantry
- Nickname: 13th Brooklyn
- Engagements: Siege of Yorktown; Battle of Williamsburg; Battle of Seven Pines; Seven Days Battles; Battle of Oak Grove; Battle of Malvern Hill; Second Battle of Bull Run; Battle of Chantilly

The 87th New York Infantry Regiment (aka "13th Brooklyn" or 13th New York State Militia) was an infantry regiment in the Union Army during the American Civil War.

== Service ==
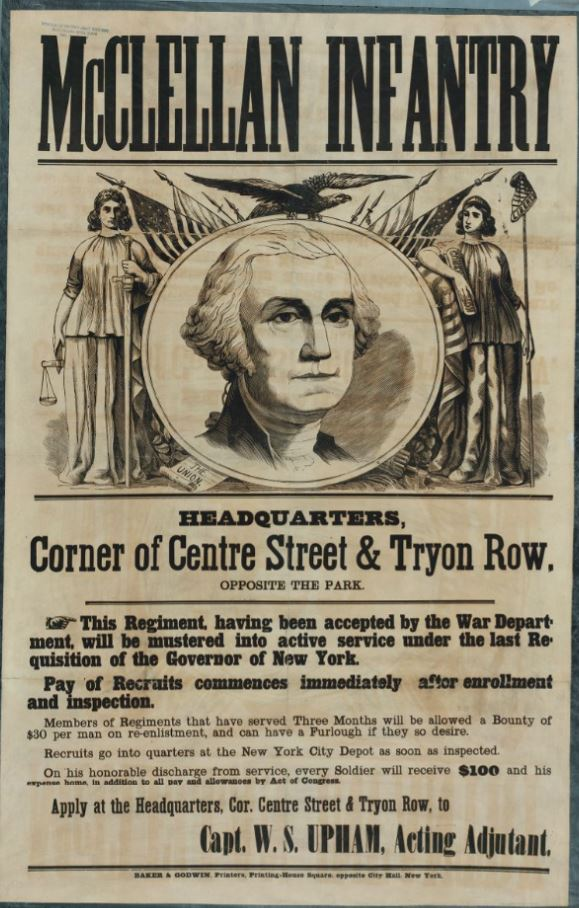
87th NY recruiting poster

The 87th New York Infantry was organized in Brooklyn, New York, beginning November 14, 1861, and mustered in for three years' service on November 20, 1861, under the command of Colonel Stephen A. Dodge.

The regiment was attached to 3rd Brigade, Casey's Division, Army of the Potomac, to March 1862. 1st Brigade, 3rd Division, III Corps, Army of the Potomac, to August 1862. 1st Brigade, 1st Division, III Corps, to September 1862.

The 87th New York Infantry ceased to exist on September 6, 1862, when it was consolidated with 40th New York Volunteer Infantry. Company B was transferred to the 173rd New York Volunteer Infantry on September 11, 1862.

== Detailed service ==
The 87th New York Regiment (aka "Brooklyn Rifles"), under command of Col. Stephen A. Dodge countermarched down Fulton Street and left Brooklyn, New York for Washington, D.C. on December 2, 1861 via railroad.

Duty in the Department of Washington until March 1862 at Camp Casey.

- Advance on Manassas, Virginia, March 10–15.

- Ordered to the Peninsula, Virginia, March 17.

- Siege of Yorktown April 5 – May 4 Siege of Yorktown (1862)

- Skirmish at Yorktown April 11.

- Battle of Williamsburg May 5.

- Battle of Seven Pines or Fair Oaks May 31 – June 1.

- Seven days before Richmond June 25 – July 1.

- Battle of Oak Grove June 25.

- Battle of Malvern Hill July 1.

- At Harrison's Landing until August 16.

- Movement to Fort Monroe, then to Centreville August 16–26.

- Pope's Campaign in northern Virginia August 26 – September 2.

- Action at Bristoe Station (Kettle Run) August 27. (many officers of the 87th New York captured at Manassas Station, Virginia.)

- Buckland's Bridge, Broad Run, August 27.

- Battle of Groveton August 29.

- Second Battle of Bull Run August 30.

- Battle of Chantilly (Ox Hill) September 1.

On Sept. 6, 1862; some 274 men of 87th New York were consolidated with the 40th New York Infantry near Alexandria, Virginia.

== Casualties ==
The regiment lost a total of 49 men during service; 1 officer and 22 enlisted men killed or mortally wounded; 26 enlisted men died of disease.

== Commanders & staff ==
- Colonel Stephen Augustus Dodge: wounded in action and captured at the Battle of Fair Oaks
- Lieutenant Colonel Richard Augustus Bachia: captured at Manassas Junction
- Major George Bacon Bosworth
- Adjutant Edward Van Ness
- 1st Lieutenant David O. Beckwith: wounded in action at the Battle of Fair Oaks
- 1st Lieutenant Peter Byron McLean
- 2nd Lieutenant Levi Branson Amerman
- 2nd Lieutenant Alfred J. Greenleaf Jr
- Quartermaster James H. Bostwick
- Quartermaster Edward Van Ness
- Assistant Surgeon William Knight
- Chaplain William H. Williams

== In popular culture ==
- In Ghostbusters: The Video Game, the regiment are non-player characters as ghosts who haunted the American Museum of Natural History's American Civil War Exhibit and have been fighting against the ghosts of the Confederate's partisan rangers (irregular military) once commanded by John A. Poindexter, failed to realize that they had died, and the war was over. There, the regiment and the Confederate ghosts are being manipulated by the spirits of Ivo Shandor and Cornelius Wellesly to hinder the Ghostbusters before they face Wellesly. In game, the regiment and their opponents are categorized as Class 4 Full-Torsoed Anchored Manifestations, trapped in the mortal plane and unable to move onto the afterlife due to not being at peace.

== See also ==
- List of New York Civil War regiments
- New York in the Civil War
