= Henry Klein (soldier) =

- Born: October 4, 1841; Germany
- Died: December 5, 1901 (aged 60)
- Burial place: Woodlawn Cemetery, Syracuse, New York, US
- Military career
- Allegiance: United States; Union
- Branch: United States Army; Union Army
- Rank: corporal
- Unit: 40th New York Volunteer Infantry Regiment
- Conflicts: American Civil War • Battle of Sayler's Creek
- Awards: Medal of Honor

Henry Klein (October 4, 1841 – December 5, 1901) was a Union Army soldier during the American Civil War and a recipient of America's highest military decoration, the Medal of Honor, for his actions at the Battle of Sayler's Creek.

Born in Germany, Klein immigrated to the United States in 1853. He settled in Syracuse, New York, and worked in the clothing business.

At the outbreak of the Civil War, he enlisted as a private in the 101st Regiment and later served in Company E of the 40th New York Volunteer Infantry Regiment. Klein's brother, Philip, also served in the war, with the 149th New York Infantry. At some point during his military service Henry Klein was captured and held as a prisoner of war by the Confederates, although the details of this event are unknown. In one battle, after General Gustavus Sniper was wounded, Klein caught the general's horse and helped him dismount. At the Battle of Sayler's Creek, Virginia, on April 6, 1865, his company was ordered to attack a Confederate position. Under heavy canister and musket fire, Klein rushed ahead of the attack, grabbed a Confederate banner from the flag bearer's hands, and returned safely back to Union lines. For this act, he was commended and granted a furlough.

On his way home to Syracuse, Klein stopped in Washington, D.C., for a few days. While he was in the city, President Abraham Lincoln was assassinated. Klein stood guard outside the house next to Ford's Theatre where Lincoln lay dying, and after the President's death he viewed the body as it lay in state at the White House.

One month after Lincoln's assassination, on May 10, 1865, Klein was awarded the Medal of Honor for his actions at Sayler's Creek. The official citation, which was mistakenly recorded under the name "Harry Kline", reads simply "Capture of battle flag." Klein was promoted to corporal before leaving the Army, and then returned to Syracuse where he resumed working in the clothing business. He was a Republican and was active in veterans' affairs. Klein died at age 60 and was buried in Syracuse's Woodlawn Cemetery, on the same lot as his Civil War commander, General Gustavus Sniper.

== See also ==
- List of Medal of Honor recipients
