= 40th New York Infantry Regiment =

- Active: June 27, 1861, to June 27, 1865
- Country: United States
- Allegiance: Union
- Branch: Infantry
- Nickname: "Mozart Regiment" or the "Constitution Guard"
- Engagements: Battle of Ball's Bluff; Peninsula Campaign; Siege of Yorktown (1862); Battle of Williamsburg; Battle of Seven Pines; Battle of Glendale; Battle of Malvern Hill; Second Battle of Bull Run; Battle of Chantilly; Battle of Fredericksburg; Battle of Chancellorsville; Battle of Gettysburg; Battle of the Wilderness; Battle of Spotsylvania Court House; Battle of Cold Harbor; Siege of Petersburg; First Battle of Deep Bottom; Battle of Sailor's Creek; Appomattox Campaign

The 40th New York Infantry Regiment, also known as the "Mozart Regiment" or the "Constitution Guard", was an infantry regiment that served in the Union Army during the American Civil War.

The 40th New York also had the 2nd highest numbers of casualties of any New York Regiment, behind the famous 69th New York Infantry of the Irish Brigade.

== Service ==
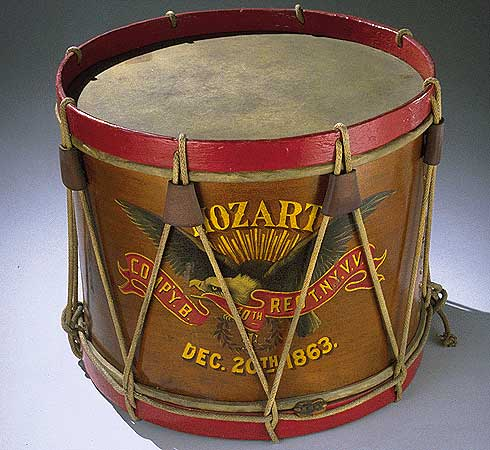
Drum, Company B

The 40th New York was mustered at Yonkers, New York, on June 27, 1861, sponsored by the Union Defense Committee of New York City by special authority from the War Department. Originally, the regiment was to be raised as the United States Constitution Guard by Colonel John S. Cocks of the 2nd New York but organization was not completed. With additional sponsorship by the Mozart Hall Committee it adopted the name Mozart regiment. Despite being a New York Regiment, only the original Constitution Guard were New Yorkers. The regiment was completed by taking four companies from Massachusetts and two from Pennsylvania. On September 6, 1862, the regiment absorbed the enlisted men of the 87th New York Volunteer Infantry Regiment. On May 30, 1863, it absorbed the three-year enlistees of the 37th New York, 38th New York, 55th New York, and 101st New York. On August 3, 1864, the regiment absorbed the 74th New York.

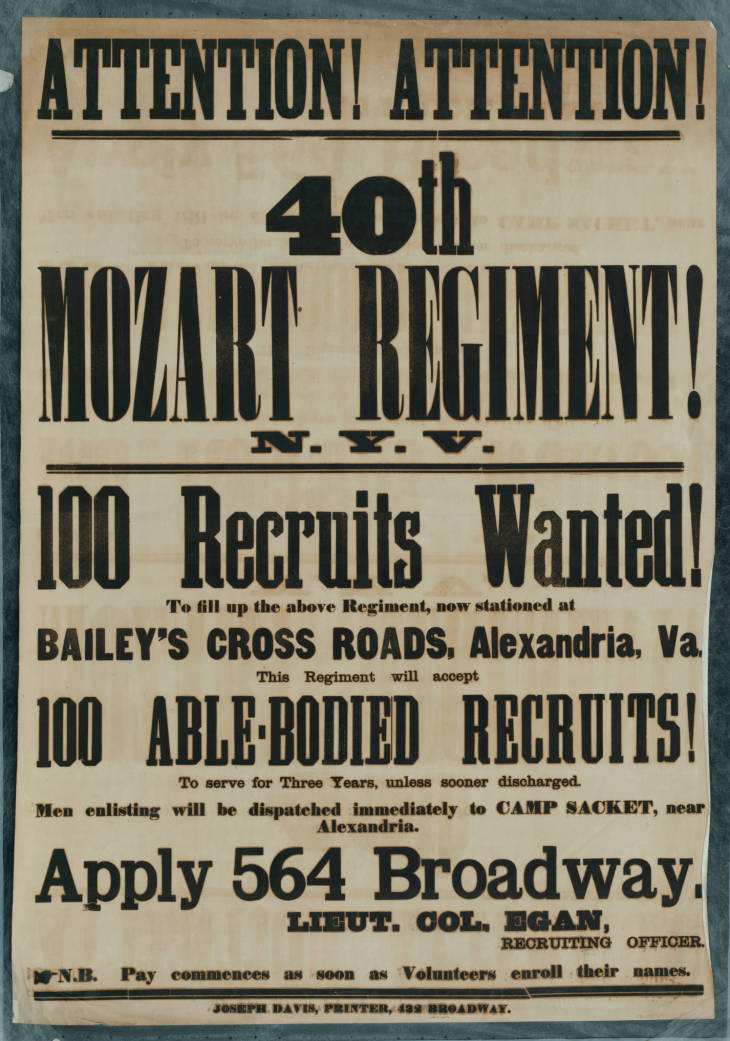
40th NY Mozart Regiment Recruiting Poster

Two men of the 40th New York earned the Medal of Honor during the Civil War. Sergeant Robert Boody of Company B was awarded the medal for carrying wounded comrades from the field at the Battles of Williamsburg and Chancellorsville, and Private Henry Klein of Company E earned it for capturing a Confederate flag at the Battle of Sayler's Creek.

The regiment mustered out on June 27, 1865, after participating in the Grand Review of the Armies.

=== Fair Oaks ===
At the Battle of Fair Oaks (Seven Pines) the 40th New York gained considerable recognition for its action on June 1. The regiment's commander, Colonel Edward J. Riley, was kicked in the head and thrown by his horse prior to the battle, removing him from the front. Lt. Col. Thomas W. Egan led the regiment into battle on May 31, and on June 1 ordered a bayonet charge into the 5th and 8th Alabama regiments. The Mozart Regiment suffered 96 casualties, including every member of the color guard killed or wounded. Following the death of Color Sergeant Joseph Conroy, Color Corporal Robert Grieves, himself severely wounded, planted the flag far out in front of the regiment, before being ordered by Egan to withdraw.

=== Gettysburg, Second Day ===
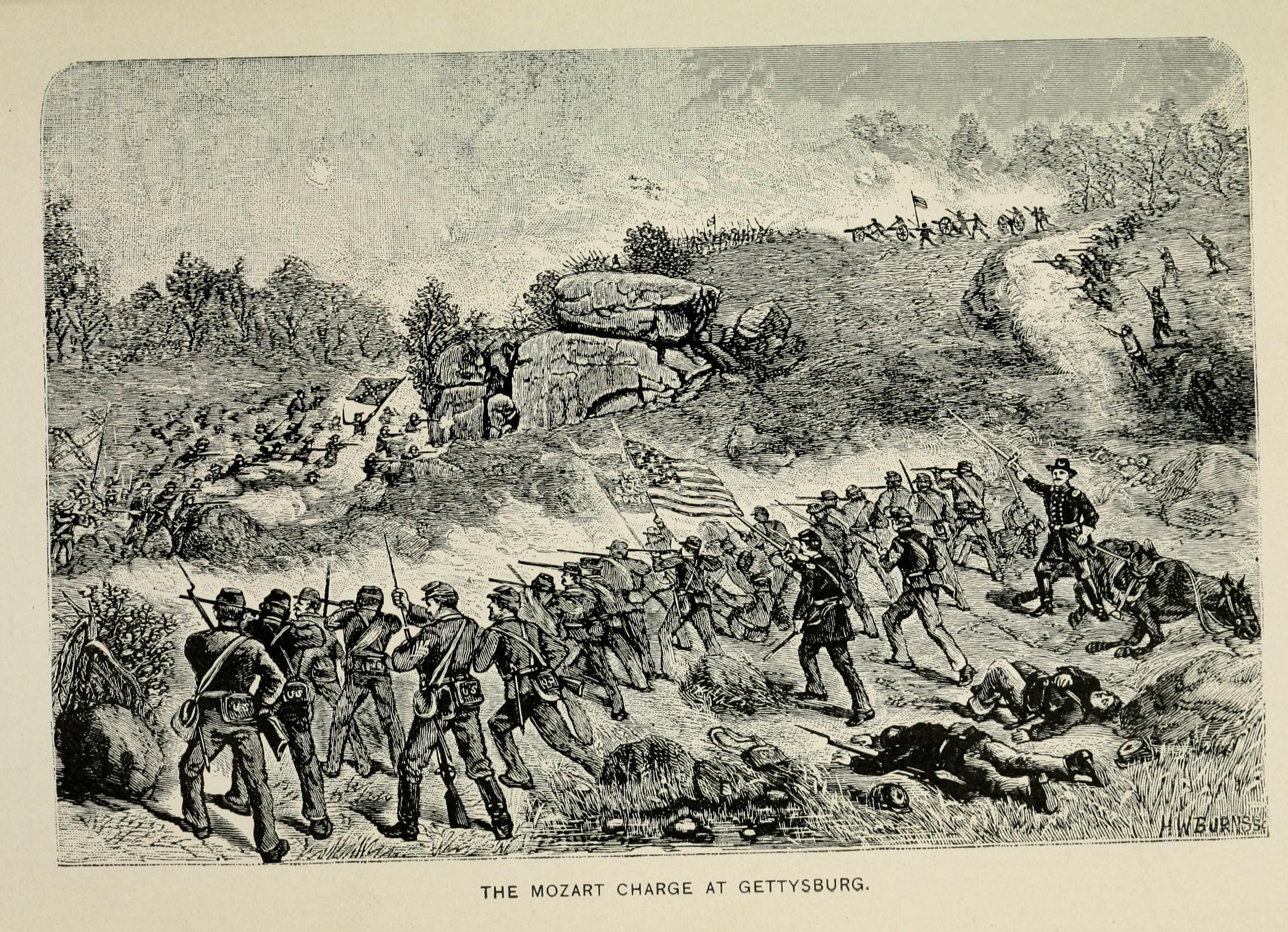
Sketch of the 40th New York charging through Devil's Den, July 2, 1863.

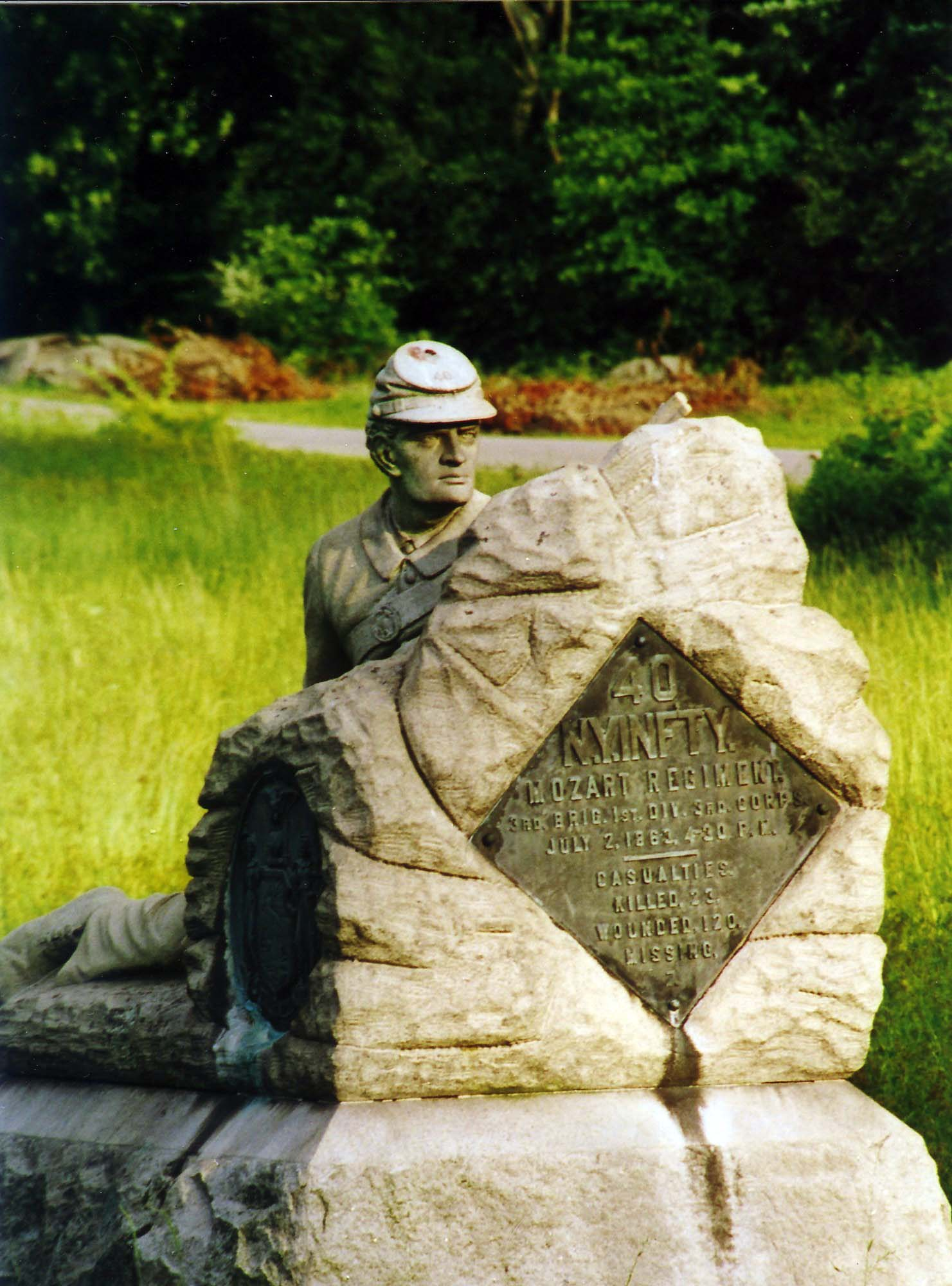
Monument at Gettysburg

The 40th New York played a critical role in the defense of the Federal left flank during the second day at Gettysburg, delaying the approach of Law's Division to Little Round Top. Initially deployed with the rest of the Third Brigade to defend the Wheatfield, Maj. Gen. David B. Birney ordered the 40th southeast into the Plum Run valley. There the orders were to delay at all costs elements of Benning's Georgia brigade and Law's Alabama brigade, as Confederates began forcing back Hobart Ward's 2nd Brigade of the Third Corps. The 40th New York charged seven times down the course of Plum Run, into the boulders of Devil's Den and the Slaughter Pen.

- Rock of the 40th NY at Gettysburg

== Total strength and casualties ==
The regiment suffered 10 officers and 228 enlisted men who were killed in action or mortally wounded and 2 officers and 170 enlisted men who died of disease, for a total of 410 fatalities.

== Commanders ==
- Major General Thomas Wilberforce Egan (1834-1887) WIA Gettysburg, WIA Petersburg
- Colonel Edward Johns Riley (1831-1918)
- Colonel Madison Mott Cannon (1840-1892)
- Lieutenant Colonel Augustus Jonathan Warner (1833-1927) WIA Gettysburg, WIA Petersburg
- Surgeon Dr. Augustus S. Campbell (1819-1867)
- Surgeon Dr. James Ewing Dexter (1822-1902)
- Chaplain Reverend William Henry Gilder (1812-1864) DOD Brandy Station, VA
- Drum Major Charles T. Smith (?-1884)
- Drummer Boy & Bugler Gustav Albert Schurmann (1849-1905)

== Soldiers ==
- Major Emmons Franklin Fletcher (1835-1866) WIA Williamsburg & Spotsylvania
- Major Albert Sherwin Ingalls (1830-1862) WIA Glendale, DOD Annapolis
- Captain Lewis John Binsse (1833-1900) KIA Wilderness
- Captain Washington Durbrow (1842-1894) WIA/POW Wilderness, escaped Andersonville
- Captain William Henry Gilder Jr (1838-1900) WIA Gettysburg
- Captain Richard Henry Ryder (1843-1894)
- Captain Henry J. Strait (1834-1885) WIA Cold Harbor
- Captain Harrison T. Walcott (1841-1864) KIA Wilderness
- 1st Lieutenant Robert Milton Boody (1836-1913) Medal of Honor Williamsburg
- 1st Lieutenant Philip Michael Harder (1839-1901)
- 1st Lieutenant Thomas Smith Rider (1843-1933)
- 1st Lieutenant William Henry Scammell (1838-1880) WIA Fair Oaks
- 1st Lieutenant Edwin James Sweet (1836-1915)
- 2nd Lieutenant Thomas Clark (?-1864) KIA Deep Bottom
- 2nd Lieutenant Jacob Amic Covington (1844-1917)
- 1st Sergeant John Conlan (?-1864) KIA Spotsylvania
- 1st Sergeant Frederick Clark Floyd (1837-1909) Wrote Regimental History
- 1st Sergeant George W. Hanan (1842-1902)
- Color Sergeant Joseph Conroy (?-1862) KIA Fair Oaks
- Sergeant Edward S. Fisher (1843-1864) DOW Spotsylvania
- Sergeant Daniel Cooledge Fletcher (1828-1916) WIA Chantilly Wrote Reminiscences California & Civil War 40th NY Regiment
- Sergeant Jonathan Sproul (1839-1863) WIA Kelly's Ford, DOW Washington D.C.
- Corporal John Francis Currier (1836-1862) KIA Fair Oaks
- Corporal Thomas Hardcastle (1843-1918) WIA Gettysburg
- Corporal Henry Klein "Kline" (1841-1901) WIA Spotsylvania, Medal of Honor Sailor's Creek
- Corporal Robert A. Verplanck (1838-1886) WIA & POW Spotsylvania, survived Andersonville
- Corporal James York (1831-1907)
- Private George R. Becker (?-1865) WIA Chantilly, POW Mine Run, DOD Andersonville
- Private John Burns (1839-1864) POW Centreville, DOD Andersonville
- Private William Bush (?-1864) KIA Spotsylvania
- Private Myron Chawgo (?-1864) WIA/POW Spotsylvania, DOW Spotsylvania
- Private Henry Mannering Clackett (1829-1888) POW Spotsylvania, Survived Andersonville
- Private Dennis Conway (1842-1889) WIA Fredericksburg
- Private Francis Coppia (?-1864) KIA Wilderness
- Private Albert C. Cressey (?-1862) KIA Fair Oaks
- Private James Arthur Cully (1847-1892)
- Private William Cushing (1837-1864) DOW Petersburg
- Private John Day (?-1864)
- Private Louis Deffer (?-1864) WIA/POW Wilderness, DOW Andersonville
- Private Albert F. Dewhurst (1839-1862) DOD Alexandria
- Private Peter W. Flannagan (1840-1864) POW Spotsylvania, DOD Andersonville
- Private John Flue (1843-1878) WIA Gettysburg, POW Cold Harbor
- Private Simon Freer (1833-1863) DOW Gettysburg
- Private John Griffin (?-1864) POW Wilderness, DOD Andersonville
- Private George W. Hall (?-1865) POW Wilderness, DOD Andersonville
- Private Matthew Hartman (1833-1865) POW Spotsylvania, DOD Andersonville
- Private John Horn (?-1902)
- Private James Kelly (1819-1864) POW Spotsylvania, DOD Andersonville
- Private Charles Lenroy (1834-1864) POW Wilderness, DOD Andersonville
- Private Lewis Long (1836-1864) POW Cold Harbor, DOD Andersonville
- Private Peter Martin (1821-1864) POW Auburn, DOD Andersonville
- Private Thomas Mitchell (1819-1864) POW Spotsylvania, DOD Florence
- Private David G. Moran (1840-1864) POW Wilderness, DOD Andersonville
- Private William S. Murphy (1823-1864) POW North Anna River, DOD Andersonville
- Private Stephen Cornelius Pearson (1840-1864) POW Spotyslvania, DOD Andersonville
- Private George Price (1843-1864) POW Wilderness, DOD Florence
- Private Levant C. Rhines (1838-1914) POW Wilderness
- Private Robert Sevier (1839-1864) POW Chancellorsville, DOD Andersonville
- Private John Shine (1834-1900) POW Cold Harbor
- Private George Siddell (1842-1864) POW Wilderness, DOD Andersonville
- Private Robert Knox Sneden (1832-1918) POW Brandy Station, Survived Andersonville - Mapmaker & compiled massive 5,000 page diary of his Civil War experience
- Private Wilson Sproul (1842-1904)
- Private John Ward (?-1864) WIA & POW Wilderness, DOD Andersonville
- Private Henry B. Whitmore (1824-1864) WIA & POW Spotsylvania, DOD Andersonville
- Private William J. Wilkinson (1842-1911) WIA Fredericksburg, WIA Petersburg
- Private Frederick W. Zoller (1844-1864) POW Gettysburg, DOD Andersonville

== See also ==
- List of New York Civil War regiments
