= Meghan Boody =

American artist

- Born: Margaret Liscomb Boody; 1964; New York City
- Education: Georgetown University, Parsons School of Design
- Known for: Surrealism, Photography, Landscape Photography, Manipulated Photography, Human Figure Photography
- Website: meghanboody.com

Meghan Boody (born 1964) is an American artist. Her work consists largely of digitally manipulated photographs as well as some multimedia sculpture. It is surreal in nature – the surrealism movement began in 1924 – and heavily narrative, often focusing on themes of self discovery. The subject is usually a young girl, often elaborately dressed, who is placed in a bizarre setting. In the 1990s she began working with Adobe Photoshop, creating digital work based on composite imagery, and is considered one of the first artists to use this technique effectively.

== Personal life ==
Meghan Boody, born Margaret Liscomb Boody, was born in New York City in 1964. She was the only adopted child of her older parents and was raised on the upper east side. Her father worked at Columbia University and her mother worked as a tester for the Education Records Bureau. She spent much time alone, as she was the only child of two working parents, and created worlds of her own incorporating her toys, dog, and pet mice. Her family spent time in Long Island during the summer and weekends. She says of the experience that she “felt liberated and less alone, roaming the fields barefoot and shirtless, making forts with the neighborhood kids.” In 1995 Meghan married James C. Ayer Jr., who worked as a portfolio manager. He graduated from Yale and Oxford. Their marriage did not last, but they have a son together, who Boody credits as an inspiration to her work. She noticed that after his birth her work became “a little lighter and more reality based”.

== Education and training ==
Meghan Boody went to Georgetown University, where she received her Bachelor of Arts in philosophy and French. She travelled to Paris her junior year to study under famed philosophers Jacques Derrida and Jean François Lyotard. In 1986 she moved to Paris, where she studied fashion design at Parsons. On a whim she enrolled in an introductory photography course and instantly took an interest in the medium. After studying in Paris, she returned to New York where she spent three years as an apprentice for Hans Namuth, a photographer. While working with him she began to incorporate interactive sculpture into her photography practice.

== Process and inspiration ==
Boody’s work is process-heavy. She photographs her costumed models in studio and then digitally adds them into the landscape or background images that she finds. She spends hours upon hours compiling the layers. Each piece takes months to finish.

The overtly theatrical and fictionalized quality in her work is inspired by the photographers Henry Peach Robinson and Oscar Rejlander. Boody says “all of my studies of philosophy contributed to piecing together my own philosophy on how I tell these stories in my photography.” In addition to philosophy, her work is also influenced by American, British, and French literature. Her fascination with the process of psychoanalysis and other healing methods also inspire her work. She seeks to create work that, she says, will “tap into different mythic archetypes of the unconscious”.

== Selected works ==
Psyche and Smut is a series of Lightjet prints created in 2000. The story of this series revolves around Psyche, a polite and respectful little girl, and Smut, her deviant, perhaps evil, twin sister. The sisters represent female duality, and the story takes them on a grand journey from separation to reconciliation. Psyche travels from the Upper East Side in New York to an underworld where her sister lives, after a fight with her mother. The twins experience some transformations and tribulations throughout the journey, and Psyche struggles to accept her sister, but in the end they are surrounded by a magnetic force field and are fused together into a new cohesive whole called Psyche Supernova.

Boody began working on her series The Lighthouse and how she got there in 2006. It is a series of digitally composited photographs depicting the growth of a young girl, confined in what appears to be a repressive boarding school, workhouse or asylum, and her adventures after the institution she lives in burns down. It is set in 19th century Great Britain. This is reflected in the titles of each piece, which are taken from the beginning lines of Victorian novels about orphans. There are three endings to the story in the series. In one she is taken in by a lighthouse keeper, in another she ends up in a field surrounded by swamps, and in the final ending she returns to the institution and escapes with a group of girls. The protagonist was photographed over the course of five years from the ages 12 to 16.

Boody's work is held in the collections of the Whitney Museum of Art in New York, NY; the Herbert F. Johnson Museum at Cornell University in Ithaca, NY; and the Museum of Old and New Art in Tasmania.
