= Thomas W. Egan =

American military officer (1836–1887)

Thomas Wilberforce Egan
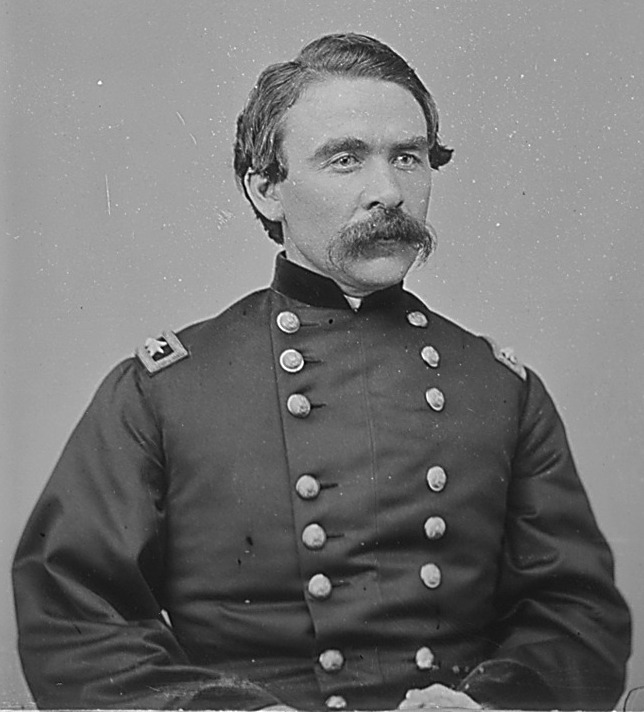
- Photograph of Egan by Mathew Brady
- Born: 1836; New York City, New York, U.S.
- Died: February 24, 1887 (aged 50–51); New York City, New York, U.S.
- Burial place: Cypress Hills National Cemetery, Brooklyn, New York
- Military career
- Allegiance: United States of America
- Branch: United States Army; Union Army
- Service years: 1861–1866
- Rank: Brigadier General; Brevet Major General
- Commands: 40th New York Volunteer Infantry; Ist Brigade, 3rd Div, II Corps; 2nd Division, II Corps
- Conflicts: American Civil War; Second Battle of Bull Run; Battle of Chantilly; Battle of Chancellorsville; Battle of Gettysburg (WIA); Mine Run Campaign; Battle of Spotsylvania Court House; Battle of North Anna; Battle of Cold Harbor; Second Battle of Petersburg (WIA); Battle of Boydton Plank Road (WIA)
- Other work: Deputy collector of Customs, New York

Thomas Wilberforce Egan (1836 – February 24, 1887) was a Union Army officer who led the Mozart Regiment during most of the American Civil War, later becoming a general.

== Early life ==
Egan was born in New York City of Irish immigrant parents in 1836. Little is known about his life before the Civil War. He is believed to have married an actress and fathered a child who died young.

== Military career ==
Egan joined the 40th New York Volunteer Infantry Regiment, called the Mozart Regiment, in April 1861 at the beginning of the Civil War, as a private. (The regiment was sponsored by the Democratic Party's Mozart Hall Committee.) Egan was made lieutenant colonel on June 14, 1861.

Lieutenant Colonel Egan participated in most of the major battles of the Army of the Potomac. Initially, the Mozart Regiment served in first division III Corps. Col. Egan is reported to have arrested the colonel of the regiment for misconduct at the Battle of Fair Oaks in May 1862. In June 1862, Egan was promoted to the rank of colonel. He led the regiment at the Second Battle of Bull Run, the Battle of Chantilly and the Battle of Chancellorsville. At Chancellorsville, Colonel Egan became acting commander of first brigade first division III Corps, when Brigadier General Charles K. Graham was assigned to command of the third division following the death of Major General Amiel W. Whipple. At the Battle of Gettysburg on July 2, 1863, Colonel Egan, once more leading his regiment, was wounded in action near Devil's Den, being hit in a leg; and the regiment's monument stands near that site. The Mozart Regiment lost 150 of 431 troops engaged. Egan also led the Mozart Regiment in the Bristoe Campaign during the autumn of 1863, and replaced Col. Régis de Trobriand in command of the brigade immediately prior to the winter Mine Run Campaign.

Just before Lieutenant General Ulysses S. Grant's Overland Campaign of 1864, III Corps was dissolved. First division became third division II Corps. Egan led his regiment in the Battle of the Wilderness. He became commander of a brigade during the Battle of Spotsylvania, after Brigadier General J. H. Hobart Ward was relieved for drunkenness on the night of May 12, 1864. His command was involved in a counterattack against the Confederates during the fighting at Harris Farm. Egan led the brigade at the Battle of North Anna, attacking Henagan's Redoubt. He also led it at the Battle of Cold Harbor. Egan was wounded during the Second Battle of Petersburg in June 1864, suffering slight paralysis as a result.

Colonel Egan received his commission as brigadier general on September 3, 1864. (Secretary of War Edwin Stanton personally handed him his commission.) At the Battle of Boydton Plank Road on October 27, he commanded the second division II Corps in place of Brigadier General John Gibbon. Egan was seriously wounded on November 14, 1864. The wound disabled his right arm. On recovering, he was given a division in the Army of the Shenandoah on the request of Major General Winfield Scott Hancock. On December 12, 1864, President Abraham Lincoln nominated Egan for appointment to the brevet grade of major general of volunteers to rank from October 27, 1864, for his service at the Battle of Boydton Plank Road, and the U.S. Senate confirmed the nomination on February 14, 1865.

== Later life ==
General Egan was mustered out of the service, January 15, 1866, and subsequently lived in New York City. He served as deputy collector of customs for the port of New York. He also belonged to the Grand Army of the Republic. Brigadier General Egan died in New York City on February 24, 1887. According to the New York Times, General Egan was struck down by epilepsy while staying at the International Hotel in New York City. He was taken to the Chambers Street Hospital, a charity hospital, where he died. He was buried at Cypress Hills National Cemetery.
