= Robert Boody =

American Civil War Medal of Honor recipient (1836–1913)

Robert Milton Boody
- Born: March 6, 1836; Limington, Maine
- Died: October 22, 1913 (aged 77)
- Burial place: Greenwood Cemetery, Haverhill, Massachusetts
- Military career
- Allegiance: United States
- Branch: United States Navy
- Service years: 1861–1864
- Rank: First lieutenant
- Unit: 40th Regiment New York Volunteer Infantry
- Conflicts: Battle of Williamsburg; Battle of Chancellorsville
- Awards: Medal of Honor

Robert Milton Boody (March 6, 1836 – October 22, 1913) was an American soldier who fought in the American Civil War. Boody received the country's highest award for bravery during combat, the Medal of Honor, for his action during the Battle of Williamsburg at Williamsburg, Virginia, and the Battle of Chancellorsville at Chancellorsville, Virginia, on May 5, 1862, and May 2, 1863. He was honored with the award on July 8, 1896.

== Biography ==
Boody was born in Limington, Maine, on March 6, 1836. He joined the army from Amesbury, Massachusetts, in June 1861. It was while he was a sergeant in the 40th New York Infantry when he performed the two acts of gallantry for which he was awarded the Medal of Honor. He was commissioned as an officer in September 1863, and was mustered out in July 1864.

Boody died on October 22, 1913, and his remains are interred in the Greenwood Cemetery in Haverhill, Massachusetts.

== Medal of Honor citation ==
This soldier, at Williamsburg, Virginia, then a corporal, at great personal risk, voluntarily saved the lives of and brought from the battlefield 2 wounded comrades. A year later, at Chancellorsville, voluntarily, and at great personal risk, brought from the field of battle and saved the life of Capt. George B. Carse, Company C, 40th New York Volunteer Infantry.

== See also ==
- List of American Civil War Medal of Honor recipients: A–F
