= Battle of Williamsburg order of battle: Union =

The following United States Army units and commanders fought in the Battle of Williamsburg of the American Civil War. The Confederate order of battle is shown separately.

== Abbreviations used ==
=== Military rank ===
- MG = Major General
- BG = Brigadier General
- Col = Colonel
- Ltc = Lieutenant Colonel
- Maj = Major
- Cpt = Captain
- Lt = Lieutenant
- Bvt = Brevet

=== Other ===
- w = wounded
- mw = mortally wounded
- k = killed

== Army of the Potomac ==
MG George B. McClellan
Commanding in the field: BG Edwin V. Sumner

=== III Corps ===
BG Samuel P. Heintzelman

Division	Brigade	Regiments and Others
Second Division; BG Joseph Hooker	First Brigade BG Cuvier Grover	2nd New Hampshire: Gilman Marston; 1st Massachusetts: Col Robert Cowdin; 11th Massachusetts: Col William E. Blaisdell; 26th Pennsylvania: Col William F. Small (w), Maj Casper M. Berry
Second Division; BG Joseph Hooker	Second Brigade Col Nelson Taylor	70th New York: Col William Dwight (w&c), Maj Thomas Hold; 72nd New York: Ltc Israel Moses; 73rd New York: Col William R. Brewster; 74th New York: Ltc Charles H. Burtis
Second Division; BG Joseph Hooker	Third Brigade BG Francis E. Patterson	5th New Jersey: Col Samuel H. Starr; 6th New Jersey: Ltc John P. Van Leer (k), Maj George C. Burling; 7th New Jersey: Ltc Ezra A. Carman (w), Maj Francis Price, Jr.; 8th New Jersey: Col Adolphus J. Johnston (w), Maj Peter H. Ryerson (k)
Second Division; BG Joseph Hooker	Artillery Maj Charles S. Wainwright	Battery D, 1st New York Artillery: Cpt Thomas W. Osborn; 4th New York Battery: Cpt James E. Smith; 6th New York Battery: Cpt Walter M. Bramhal; Battery H, 1st United States Artillery: Cpt Charles H. Webber
Third Division; BG Philip Kearny	First Brigade BG Charles Davis Jameson	57th Pennsylvania: Col Charles T. Campbell; 63rd Pennsylvania: Col Alexander Hays; 105th Pennsylvania: Col Amor A. McKnight; 87th New York: Col Stephen A. Dodge
Third Division; BG Philip Kearny	Second Brigade BG David B. Birney	38th New York: Col J. H. Hobart Ward; 40th New York: Col Edward J. Riley; 3rd Maine: Col Henry G. Staples; 4th Maine: Col Elijah Walker
Third Division; BG Philip Kearny	Third Brigade BG Hiram G. Berry	2nd Michigan: Col Orlando M. Poe; 3rd Michigan: Col Stephen G. Champlin; 5th Michigan: Col Henry D. Terry; 37th New York: Col Samuel B. Hayman
Third Division; BG Philip Kearny	Artillery Cpt James Thompson	Battery B, 1st New Jersey Light Artillery: Cpt John E. Beam; Battery E, 1st Rhode Island Light Artillery: Cpt George E. Randolph; Battery G, 2nd U.S. Artillery: Cpt James Thompson

=== IV Corps ===
BG Erasmus D. Keyes

Division	Brigade	Regiments and Others
First Division; BG Darius N. Couch	First Brigade BG Charles Devens	7th Massachusetts: Col David A. Russell; 10th Massachusetts: Col Henry S. Briggs; 2nd Rhode Island: Col Frank Wheaton; 36th New York
First Division; BG Darius N. Couch	Second Brigade BG Lawrence P. Graham	23rd Pennsylvania: Col Thomas H. Neill; 31st Pennsylvania: Col David H. Williams; 61st Pennsylvania: Col Oliver H. Rippey; 65th New York: Ltc Alexander Shaler; 67th New York: Ltc Nelson Cross
First Division; BG Darius N. Couch	Third Brigade BG John J. Peck	55th New York: Col P. Regis de Trobriand; 62nd New York: Col John L. Riker; 93rd Pennsylvania: Col James M. McCarter; 98th Pennsylvania: Col John F. Ballier; 102nd Pennsylvania: Col Thomas Algeo Rowley
First Division; BG Darius N. Couch	Artillery Maj Robert M. West	Battery C, 1st Pennsylvania Light Artillery: Cpt Jeremiah McCarthy; Battery D, 1st Pennsylvania Light Artillery: Cpt Edward H. Flood; Battery E, 1st Pennsylvania Light Artillery: Cpt Theodore Miller; Battery H, 1st Pennsylvania Light Artillery: Cpt James Brady
Second Division; BG William F. Smith	First Brigade BG Winfield S. Hancock	5th Wisconsin: Col Amasa Cobb; 6th Maine: Col Hiram Burnham; 43rd New York: Col Francis L. Vinton; 49th Pennsylvania: Col William H. Irwin
Second Division; BG William F. Smith	Second Brigade BG William T. H. Brooks	2nd Vermont: Col Henry Whitting; 3rd Vermont: Col Breed N. Hyde; 4th Vermont: Col Edwin H. Stoughton; 5th Vermont: Ltc Lewis A. Grant; 6th Vermont: Ltc Nathan Lord
Second Division; BG William F. Smith	Third Brigade BG John Davidson	7th Maine: Col Edwin C. Mason; 33rd New York: Col Robert F. Taylor; 49th New York: Col Daniel D. Bidwell; 77th New York: Col James B. McKean
Second Division; BG William F. Smith	Artillery Cpt Romeyn B. Ayres	1st New York Battery: Lt Andrew Cowan; 3rd New York Battery: Cpt Thaddeus P. Mott; Battery E, 1st New York Light Artillery: Cpt Charles C. Wheeler; Battery F, 5th U.S. Artillery: Cpt Romeyn B. Ayres
Third Division; BG Silas Casey	First Brigade BG Henry Morris Naglee	52nd Pennsylvania: Col John C. Dodge, Jr.; 104th Pennsylvania: Col William W. H. Davis; 56th New York: Col Charles H. Van Wyck; 100th New York: Col James M. Brown; 11th Maine: Col John C. Caldwell
Third Division; BG Silas Casey	Second Brigade BG William H. Keim	96th New York: Ltc Charles O. Gray; 85th Pennsylvania: Col Joshua B. Howell; 101st Pennsylvania: Col Joseph H. Wilson; 103rd Pennsylvania: Maj Audley W. Gazzon
Third Division; BG Silas Casey	Third Brigade BG Innis N. Palmer	81st New York: Ltc Jacob J. De Forest; 85th New York: Col Jonathan S. Belknap; 92nd New York: Ltc Hiram Anderson, Jr.; 93rd New York: Ltc Benjamin C. Butler; 98th New York: Col William Dutton
Third Division; BG Silas Casey	Artillery Col Guilford D. Bailey	7th New York Battery: Cpt Peter C. Regan; 8th New York Battery: Cpt Butler Fitch; Battery A, 1st New York Artillery: Cpt Thomas H. Bates; Battery H, 1st New York Artillery: Cpt Joseph Spratt
	Cavalry	5th U.S. Cavalry: Maj Joseph H. Whittlesey

=== Cavalry Advanced Guard ===
BG George Stoneman

Brigade	Regiments and Others
Cooke's Brigade BG Philip St. George Cooke	1st U.S. Cavalry: Ltc William N. Grier; 6th U.S. Cavalry: Maj Lawrence Williams
First Brigade BG William H. Emory	3rd Pennsylvania Cavalry: Col William W. Averell; 8th Illinois Cavalry: Col John F. Farnsworth; McClellan Dragoons: Maj Charles W. Barker
Artillery Ltc William Hays	Batteries B and L, 2nd U.S. Artillery: Cpt James M. Robertson; Battery M, 2nd U.S. Artillery: Cpt Henry Benson; Battery C, 3rd U.S. Artillery: Cpt Horatio G. Gibson; Battery K, 3rd U.S. Artillery: Cpt John C. Tidball
