= Battle of Williamsburg order of battle =

The order of battle for the Battle of Williamsburg includes:

- Battle of Williamsburg order of battle: Confederate
- Battle of Williamsburg order of battle: Union
