= 55th New York Infantry Regiment =

Union Army military unit during the American Civil War

- Active: August 28, 1861 - December 21, 1862
- Country: United States
- Allegiance: Union
- Branch: Union Army
- Type: Infantry
- Nickname: Gardes de Lafayette (Guards of Lafayette)
- Engagements: American Civil War: Siege of Yorktown; Battle of Williamsburg; Battle of Seven Pines; Seven Days Battles; Battle of Malvern Hill; Battle of Fredericksburg

Commanders
- Notable commanders: Régis de Trobriand

The 55th New York Infantry Regiment (aka Gardes de Lafayette) was an infantry regiment in the Union Army during the American Civil War predominantly made up of French immigrants.

== Service ==
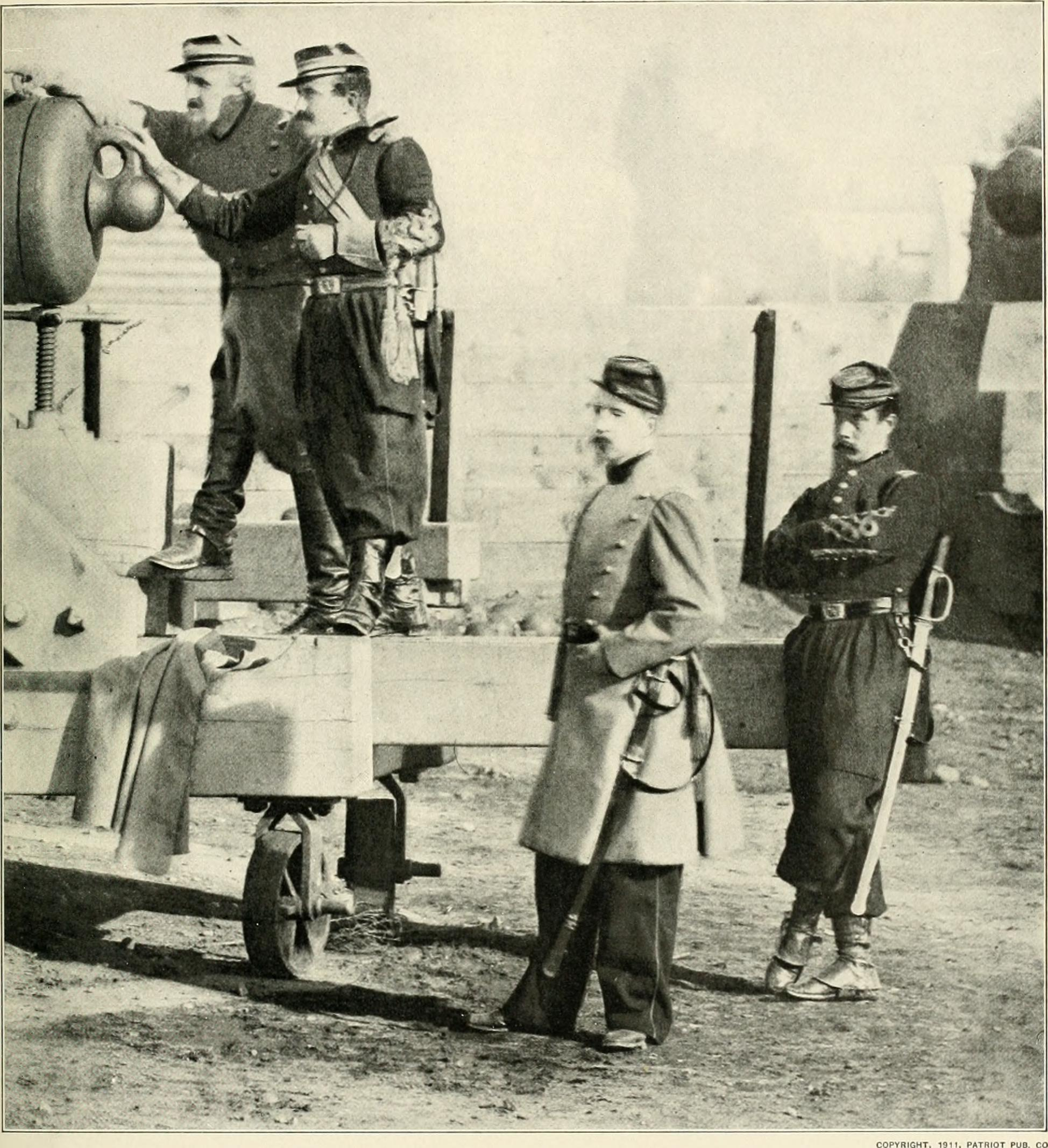
Officers of the 55th at Fort Gaines

The 55th New York Infantry was organized in camp near New Dorp, Staten Island, New York and mustered in August 28, 1861 under the command of Colonel Régis de Trobriand. Company B did not join the regiment until April 1862.

The regiment was attached to Peck's Brigade, Buell's Division, Army of the Potomac, to March 1862. 2nd Brigade, 1st Division, IV Corps, Army of the Potomac, to September 1862. 3rd Brigade, 1st Division, III Corps, to November 1862. 2nd Brigade, 1st Division, III Corps, to December 1862.

The 55th New York Infantry ceased to exist on December 21, 1862 when it was consolidated with the 38th New York Infantry Regiment as Companies G, H, I, and K.

== Detailed service ==
Left New York for Washington, D.C., August 31, 1861. Duty at Fort Gaines, Md., September and October 1861. Duty in the defenses of Washington, D.C., until March 1862. Marched to Prospect Hill, Va., March 11–15. Moved to the Peninsula, Virginia, March 28. Siege of Yorktown April 5–May 4. Battle of Williamsburg May 5. Operations about Bottom's Bridge May 20–23. Battle of Seven Pines May 31 – June 1. Seven days before Richmond June 25 – July 1. Malvern Hill July 1. At Harrison's Landing until August 16. Movement to Fort Monroe, then to Centreville August 16–29. Duty in the defenses of Washington until October. Movement to Falmouth, Va., October–November. Battle of Fredericksburg, Va., December 12–15.

== Casualties ==
The regiment lost a total of 62 men during service; 33 enlisted men killed or mortally wounded, 29 enlisted men died of disease.

== Commanders ==
- Colonel Régis de Trobriand
- Lieutenant Colonel Louis Thourot - commanded during the Seven Days Battles

== See also ==
- List of New York Civil War regiments
- New York in the Civil War
