= 38th New York Infantry Regiment =

- Active: June 3, 1861, to June 22, 1863
- Country: United States
- Allegiance: Union
- Branch: Infantry
- Size: 939, (Note: As reported back to Adjutant General Hillhouse upon departure from New York on June 27, 1861) 740 (Note: As reported back to Adjutant General Hillhouse, on December 31, 1861), 772 (Note: As reported back to Adjutant General Sprague, on December 31, 1861)
- Nickname: 2nd Scott Life Guard
- Equipment: Harpers Ferry rifles (.58 caliber, rifled), model 1855, 1861 Austrian Rifled Muskets
- Engagements: Battle of Fairfax Court House; First Battle of Bull Run; Siege of Yorktown; Battle of Williamsburg; Battle of Fair Oaks; Seven Days Battles; Battle of Savage's Station; Battle of Glendale; Battle of Malvern Hill; Manassas Station Operations; Second Battle of Bull Run; Battle of Chantilly; Battle of Fredericksburg; Battle of Chancellorsville

Commanders
- Notable commanders: Col. J. H. Hobart Ward; Col. James C. Strong; Col. Régis de Trobriand

Insignia
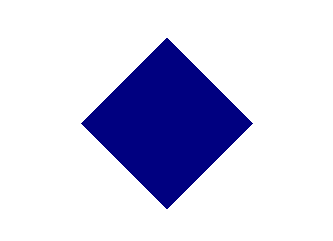
- III Corps (3rd Division) badge

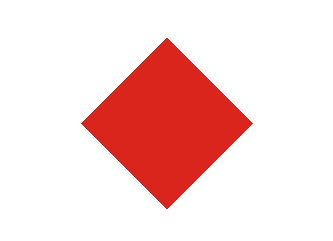
- III Corps (1st Division) badge

The 38th New York Infantry Regiment was a two-year infantry regiment in the U.S. Army during the American Civil War.

== Service ==
The 38th New York Infantry was organized at New York city by Colonel J. H. Hobart Ward who was appointed by the State of New York May 25, 1861. It mustered in the United States service at East New York for two years, June 3 and 8 (Company I), 1861. The 18th Militia furnished men for one company. In September, 1861, ninety-seven men of the 4th Me. Volunteers were assigned to the regiment. December 21, 1862, the regiment was consolidated into six companies, A, B, C, D, E and F, and the same day the 55th New York Infantry Regiment, consolidated into four companies, joined by transfer, forming new Companies G, H, I and K of the regiment. June 3, 1863, the three years' men of the regiment, all in the four companies G, H, I and K, were transferred to the 40th New York Infantry Regiment, and became Companies A, E and H of the latter.

The original companies were recruited principally:

- A, B, C, D and F — New York city
- E — Westchester county
- G — Westchester and Dutchess counties
- H — Geneva and in the county of Ontario
- I — Horseheads
- K — Elizabethtown

The regiment left the State June 19, 1861 and returned to New York city to muster out on June 22, 1863.

== Affiliations, battle honors, detailed service, and casualties ==
=== Organizational affiliation ===
Attached to:

- Col. Willcox's Brigade, Brig.Gen. Heintzelman's Division, Brig.Gen. McDowell's Army of Northeast Virginia, to August, 1861.
- Col. Howard's Brigade, Division of the Potomac, to October, 1861.
- Brig.Gen. Sedgwick's Brigade, Brig.Gen. Heintzelman's Division, Army of the Potomac (AoP), to March, 1862.
- 2nd Brigade, 3rd Division, III Corps, AoP, to July, 1862.
- 2nd Brigade, 1st Division, III Corps, to June, 1863.

=== List of battles ===
The official list of battles in which the regiment bore a part:

- First Battle of Bull Run
- Siege of Yorktown
- Battle of Williamsburg
- Battle of Fair Oaks
- Seven Days Battles
- Battle of Savage's Station
- Battle of Glendale
- Battle of Malvern Hill
- Battle of South Mountain
- Second Battle of Bull Run
- Battle of Chantilly
- Battle of Fredericksburg
- Battle of Chancellorsville

=== Detailed service ===
==== 1861 ====
- Left New York for Washington, D.C., September 20, 1861.
- Duty in the Defences of Washington, DC till July 16.
- Advance on Manassas, Va., July 16–21.
- First Battle of Bull Run, Va., July 21.
- Duty in the Defences of Washington, D. C, till March, 1862.

==== 1862 ====
- Advance on Manassas, Va., March 10–15, 1862.
- Ordered to the Peninsula March 17.
- Peninsula Campaign April to August.
- Siege of Yorktown April 5-May 4.
- Battle of Williamsburg May 5.
- Battle of Seven Pines or Fair Oaks May 31-June 1.
- Seven days before Richmond June 25-July 1.
- Battles of Oak Grove near Seven Pines June 25.
- White Oak Swamp and Glendale June 30.
- Malvern Hill July 1.
- At Harrison's Landing till August 16.
- Movement to Fortress Monroe, thence to Centreville August 16–26.
- Pope's Campaign in Northern Virginia August 27-September 2.
- Battles of Groveton August 29;
- Second Battle of Bull Run August 30;
- Chantilly September 1.
- Duty in the Defences of Washington, D. C, till October.
- Movement to Falmouth, Va., October and November.
- Battle of Fredericksburg, Va., December 12–15
- Duty at Falmouth, Va., until April 1863.

==== 1863 ====
- "Mud March" January 20–24, 1863.
- At Falmouth till April.
- Chancellorsville Campaign April 27-May 6.
- Battle of Chancellorsville May 1–5.
- Three years men transferred to 40th Regiment New York Infantry June 3
- Mustered out June 22, 1863, expiration of term.

== Casualties ==
Regiment lost during service 3 Officers and 72 Enlisted men killed and mortally wounded and 3 Officers and 39 Enlisted men by disease. Total 117. The regiment's bloodiest battles were First Bull Run, Williamsburg, Seven Days, and Fredericksburg.

== Armament ==
Soldiers in the 38th were initially armed with Model 1841 Mississippi rifles. (Note: These were also referred to by the Adjutant General's report as "Harper's Ferry" rifles.) These rifles had been manufactured by the Harper's Ferry Arsenal and by contract in 1844 in Windsor, Vermont by the Robbins and Lawrence Armory (R&L) which had also made the 1855 modifications of increasing the bore to .58 and fitting them with a sword bayonet. (Note: The company's first order was for 10,000 model 1841 rifles for $11.90 each. R&L also received the contract to upgrade the M1841s they made in the 1855-1856 upgrade. They had also been able to sell gun making machinery (150 in all), to upgrade the new Enfield Armory in England. The British also awarded a later contract during the Crimean War for 25,000 Enfield P1853 and P1856e rifles. The contract's stiff penalty clause for missing the production schedule caused R&L to go bankrupt in 1859. Lamon, Goodnow and Yale (LG&Y) bought the factory to make sewing machines, but the onset of the war led them to continue producing the P1853, P1856, and licensed Sharps 1859s for the duration of the war.) On July 7, 1861, companies A through F exchanged these rifles for rifle-muskets at the Washington DC arsenal. By the end of the first full year of hard campaigning, the regiment reported the following survey result to U.S. War Department:

Fredericksburg

- A — 41 Springfield Rifled Muskets, model 1855, 1861 National Armory (NA) (Note: In government records, National Armory refers to one of three United States Armory and Arsenals, the Springfield Armory, the Harpers Ferry Armory, and the Rock Island Arsenal. Rifle-muskets, muskets, and rifles were manufactured in Springfield and Harper's Ferry before the war. When the Rebels destroyed the Harpers Ferry Armory early in the American Civil War and stole the machinery for the Richmond Arsenal, the Springfield Armory was briefly the only government manufacturer of arms, until the Rock Island Arsenal was established in 1862. During this time production ramped up to unprecedented levels ever seen in American manufacturing up until that time, with only 9,601 rifles manufactured in 1860, rising to a peak of 276,200 by 1864. These advancements would not only give the Union a decisive technological advantage over the Confederacy during the war but served as a precursor to the mass production manufacturing that contributed to the post-war Second Industrial Revolution and 20th century machine manufacturing capabilities. American historian Merritt Roe Smith has drawn comparisons between the early assembly machining of the Springfield rifles and the later production of the Ford Model T, with the latter having considerably more parts, but producing a similar numbers of units in the earliest years of the 1913–1915 automobile assembly line, indirectly due to mass production manufacturing advancements pioneered by the armory 50 years earlier.) and contract (.58 Cal.)
- B — 35 Austrian Rifled Muskets, leaf and block sights, Quadrangular bayonet (.577 Cal) (Note: The Lorenz rifle was the third most widely used rifle during the American Civil War. The Union recorded purchases of 226,924. Its quality was inconsistent. Some were considered to be of the finest quality (particularly ones from the Vienna Arsenal), and were sometimes praised as being superior to the Enfield; others, especially those in later purchases from private contractors, were described as horrible in both design and condition. Lorenz rifles in the Civil War were generally used with .54 caliber cartridges designed for the Model 1841 "Mississippi" rifle. These differed from the cartridges manufactured in Austria and may have contributed to the unreliability of the weapons. Many of the rifles were bored out to .58 caliber to accommodate standard Springfield rifle ammunition.)
- C — 7 Springfield Rifled Muskets, model 1855, 1861, NA and contract, (.58 Cal.); 36 Austrian Rifled Muskets, leaf and block sights, quadrangular bayonet (.54 and.55 Cal)
- D — 44 Austrian Rifled Muskets, leaf and block sights, quadrangular bayonet (.54 and.55 Cal)
- E — 36 Austrian Rifled Muskets, leaf and block sights, quadrangular bayonet (.577 Cal)
- F — 1 Springfield Rifled Muskets, model 1855, 1861, N.A. and contract. Calibre .58; 29 Austrian Rifled Muskets, leaf and block sights, quadrangular bayonet (.577 Cal)
- G — unreported, probably Model 1841 rifles, NA and contract, (.54 and .58 Cal.), leaf and block sights, sabre bayonet
- H — unreported, probably Model 1841 rifles, NA and contract, (.54 and .58 Cal.), leaf and block sights, sabre bayonet
- I — unreported, probably Model 1841 rifles, NA and contract, (.54 and .58 Cal.), leaf and block sights, sabre bayonet
- K — unreported, probably Model 1841 rifles, NA and contract, (.54 and .58 Cal.), leaf and block sights, sabre bayonet

Chancellorsville

- A — 47 Springfield Rifled Muskets, model 1855, 1861, NA and contract, (.58 Cal.)
- B — 60 Light French Liege M1853 rifle, (Note: The 1853 Liege was a two-band fifle similar to the Model 1856 Enfield.) sabre bayonet (.577 Cal.)
- C — 50 Light French Liege M1853 rifles, sabre bayonet (.577 Cal.)
- D — 59 Model 1841 rifles, NA and contract, (.54 and .58 Cal.), leaf and block sights, sabre bayonet
- E — 52 Model 1841 rifles, NA and contract, (.54 and .58 Cal.), leaf and block sights, sabre bayonet
- F — 46 Model 1841 rifles, NA and contract, (.54 and .58 Cal.), leaf and block sights, sabre bayonet
- G — unreported, probably Model 1841 rifles, NA and contract, (.54 and .58 Cal.), leaf and block sights, sabre bayonet
- H — unreported, probably Model 1841 rifles, NA and contract, (.54 and .58 Cal.), leaf and block sights, sabre bayonet
- I — 41 Model 1841 rifles, NA and contract, (.54 and .58 Cal.), leaf and block sights, sabre bayonet
- K — unreported, probably Model 1841 rifles, NA and contract, (.54 and .58 Cal.), leaf and block sights, sabre bayonet

=== Rifle-muskets ===
Issued weapons

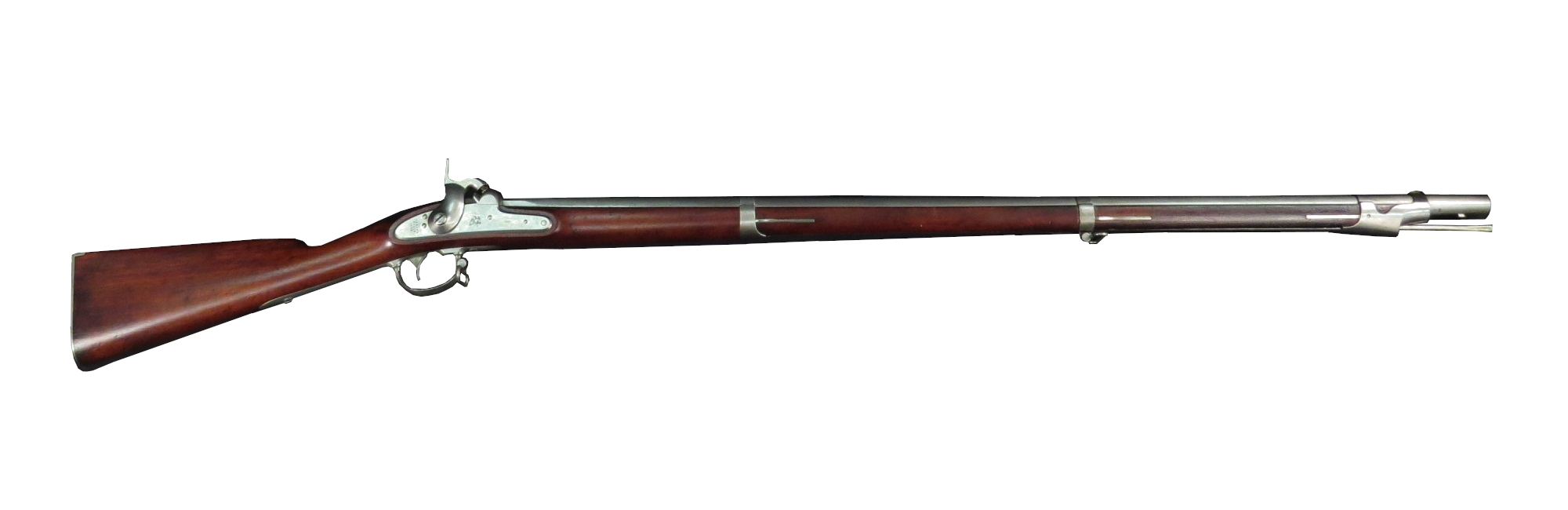
Model 1842 smoothbore musket

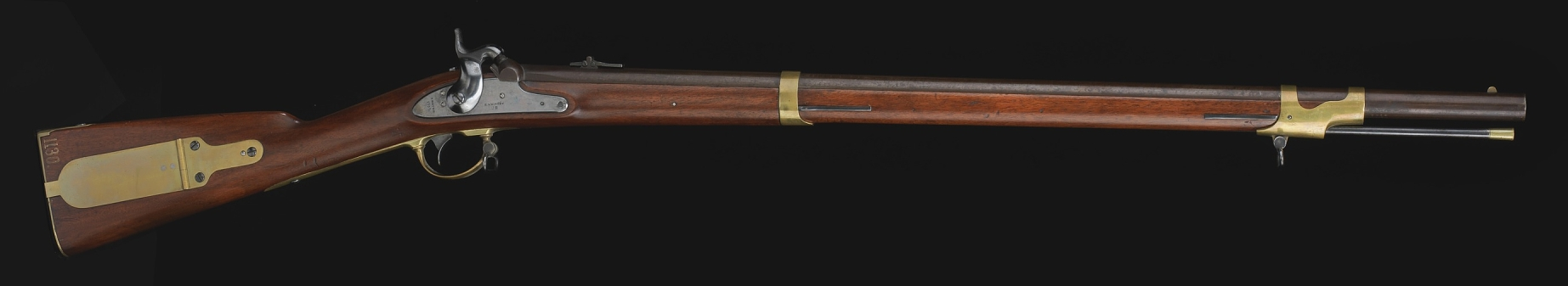
M1841 Mississippi rifle

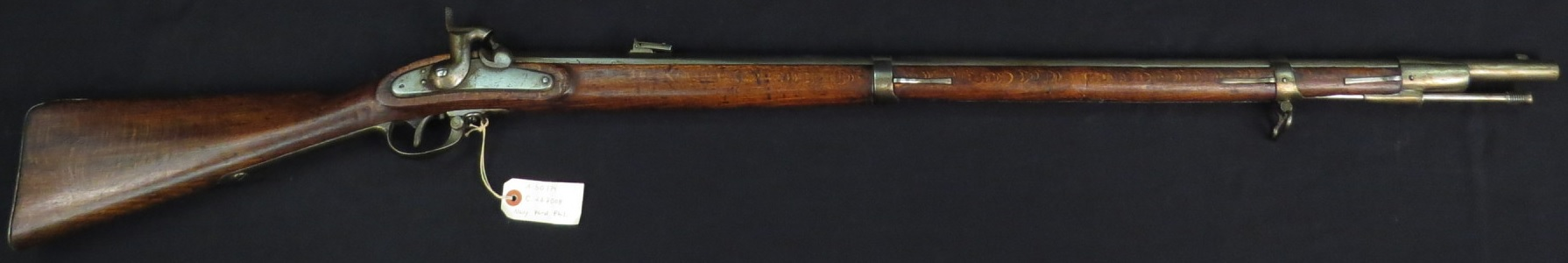
Lorenz Rifle Model 1854

== Uniform ==
The men of the regiment were initially issued the standard blue sack coats, sky blue infantry trousers, and the sky blue infantry winter overcoat.

== Commanders ==
- Col. J. H. Hobart Ward - June 8, 1861 to October 10, 1862
- Col. James Clark Strong - October 10, 1862 to December 23, 1862
- Col. Philipe Régis de Trobriand - December 23, 1862 to June 22, 1863

== See also ==
- List of New York Civil War regiments
- New York in the Civil War
