= Battle of Williamsburg order of battle: Confederate =

Units fighting in the American Civil War

The following Confederate States Army units and commanders fought in the Battle of Williamsburg of the American Civil War. The Union order of battle is shown separately.

== Abbreviations used ==
=== Military rank ===
- LTG = Lieutenant General
- MG = Major General
- BG = Brigadier General
- Col = Colonel
- Ltc = Lieutenant Colonel
- Maj = Major
- Cpt = Captain
- Lt = Lieutenant
- Bvt = Brevet Rank

=== Other ===
- w = wounded
- mw = mortally wounded
- k = killed

== Army of Northern Virginia ==
Gen Joseph E. Johnston
Commanding in the field: MG James Longstreet

Division	Brigade	Regiments and Others
Second Division MG James Longstreet; BG Richard H. Anderson	First Brigade BG A. P. Hill	1st Virginia Infantry: Col Louis B. Williams (w), Maj William H. Palmer (w); 7th Virginia Infantry: Col James L. Kemper; 11th Virginia Infantry: Col Samuel Garland (w); 17th Virginia Infantry: Col Montgomery D. Corse
Second Division MG James Longstreet; BG Richard H. Anderson	Second Brigade BG Richard H. Anderson; Col Micah Jenkins	4th South Carolina Battalion: Maj Charles S. Mattison; 5th South Carolina: Col John R.R. Giles; 6th South Carolina: Col John Bratton; Palmetto (S. C.) Sharpshooters: Col Micah Jenkins, Ltc Joseph Walker; Louisiana Foot Rifles: Cpt McGavock Godwyn; Fauquier (Virginia) Artillery: Cpt Robert M. Stribling; Williamsburg (Virginia) Artillery (2 guns): Cpt William R. Garret; Richmond (Virginia) Howitzers (2 guns): Cpt Edward S. McCarthy
Second Division MG James Longstreet; BG Richard H. Anderson	Third Brigade BG George Pickett	8th Virginia Infantry: Ltc Norbourne Berkeley; 18th Virginia Infantry: Ltc Henry A. Carrington; 19th Virginia Infantry: Col John B Strange; 28th Virginia Infantry: Col Robert C. Allen; Lynchburg (Virginia) Battery: Cpt James Dearing
Second Division MG James Longstreet; BG Richard H. Anderson	Fourth Brigade BG Cadmus M. Wilcox	9th Alabama: Col Samuel Henry; 10th Alabama: Col John Woodward; 19th Mississippi: Col Christopher H. Mott (k), Ltc Lucius Q. C. Lamar
Second Division MG James Longstreet; BG Richard H. Anderson	Fifth Brigade BG Roger A. Pryor	8th Alabama: Ltc Thomas E. Irby (k); 14th Alabama: Maj Owen K. McLemore; 14th Louisiana: Col Richard W. Jones; 32nd Virginia Infantry (detachment); Richmond (Virginia) Fayette Artillery: Lt William I. Clopton
Second Division MG James Longstreet; BG Richard H. Anderson	Colston's Brigade BG Raleigh E. Colston	3rd Virginia Infantry: Col Joseph Mayo; 13th North Carolina: Col Alfred M. Scales; 14th North Carolina: Col Philetus W. Roberts; Donaldsonville Louisiana Artillery (3 guns): Lt Lestang Fortier
Magruder's Command BG D.R. Jones; BG Lafayette McLaws	Semmes' Brigade BG Paul J. Semmes	5th Louisiana; 10th Georgia; 10th Louisiana Infantry: Col Antoine J. de Marigny; 15th Virginia Infantry
Magruder's Command BG D.R. Jones; BG Lafayette McLaws	Kershaw's Brigade BG Joseph B. Kershaw	2nd South Carolina; 3rd South Carolina; 7th South Carolina; 8th South Carolina
Magruder's Command BG D.R. Jones; BG Lafayette McLaws	Forces at Williamsburg Col Benjamin S. Ewell	17th Virginia Infantry (Company H); 32nd Virginia Infantry (detachment); 52nd Virginia Militia; 68th Virginia Militia; 115th Virginia Militia; Companies B and C, Allens' Battalion
D. H. Hill's Division MG D. H. Hill	Early's Brigade BG Jubal A. Early (W); Col Duncan K. McRae (w)	5th North Carolina: Col Duncan K. McRae; 23rd North Carolina: Col John F. Hoke, Maj Daniel H. Christie; 24th Virginia Infantry: Col William R. Terry (w), Maj Richard L. Maury; 38th Virginia Infantry: Ltc Powhatan B. Whittle
D. H. Hill's Division MG D. H. Hill	Rodes' Brigade BG Robert E. Rodes	5th Alabama: Col Christopher C. Pegues; 6th Alabama: Col John B. Gordon; 12th Alabama: Col Robert T. Jones; 12th Mississippi: Col William H. Taylor; 2nd Florida: Col George T. Ward (k)
D. H. Hill's Division MG D. H. Hill	Rains' Brigade BG Gabriel J. Rains	13th Alabama: Col Birkett D. Fry; 26th Alabama Col Edward A. O'Neal; 6th Georgia: Col Alfred H. Colquitt; 23rd Georgia: Col Thomas Hutcherson
D. H. Hill's Division MG D. H. Hill	Featherston's Brigade BG W.S. Featherston	27th Georgia: Col Levi B. Smith; 28th Georgia: Col Thomas J. Warthen; 4th North Carolina: Col George B. Anderson; 49th Virginia: Col William "Extra Billy" Smith
D. H. Hill's Division MG D. H. Hill	Unattached	2nd Mississippi Battalion: Ltc John G. Taylor
Cavalry	Cavalry Brigade BG J. E. B. Stuart	1st Virginia Cavalry; 3rd Virginia Cavalry: Col Thomas F. Goode; 4th Virginia Cavalry: Col Williams C. Wickham(w),(Maj William H. F. Payne (w), Cpt Robert E. Utterback; Jeff. Davis (Mississippi) Legion: Ltc William T. Martin; Wise Legion Cavalry: Col J. Lucius Davis; Pelham's (Virginia) Horse Artillery: Cpt John Pelham
from MG G.W. Smith's Command	Unattached	Hampton's (South Carolina) Legion
