= Battle of Seven Pines =

Major battle of the American Civil War

- Part of the American Civil War
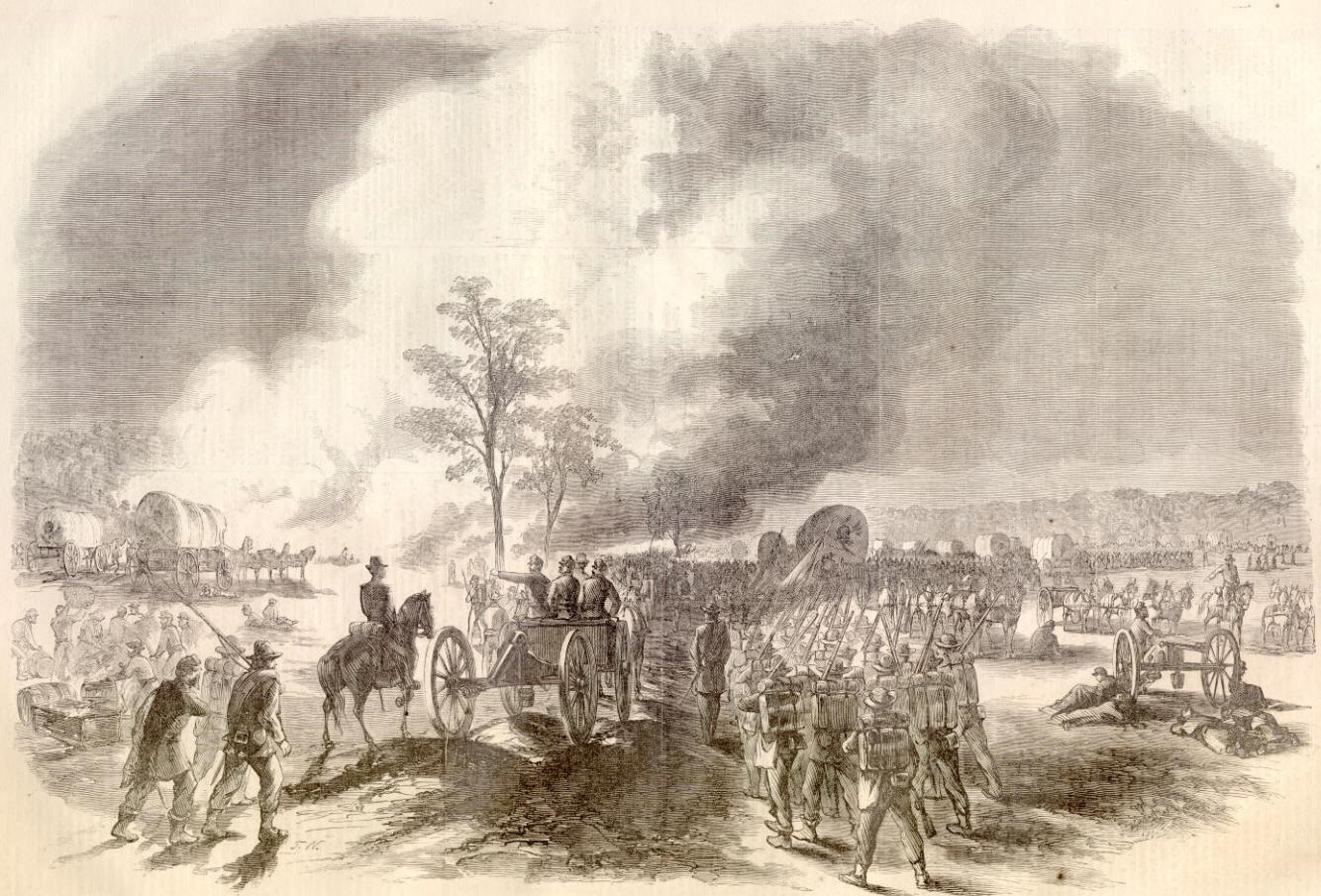
- Franklin's corps retreating from the Battle of Fair Oaks (from a sketch by Alfred R. Waud)
Date	May 31 – June 1, 1862
Location	Henrico County, Virginia 37°31′14″N 77°18′07″W
Result	Inconclusive

Belligerents
United States	Confederate States

Commanders and leaders
George B. McClellan; Erasmus D. Keyes; Samuel P. Heintzelman; Edwin V. Sumner	(Confederate States of America) Joseph E. Johnston (WIA) (Confederate States of America) G. W. Smith (Confederate States of America) James Longstreet (Confederate States of America) D. H. Hill

Units involved
Army of the Potomac	(Confederate States of America) Army of Northern Virginia

Strength
34,000	39,000

Casualties and losses
5,431 total (790 killed, 3,594 wounded, 1,047 captured/missing)	6,134 total (980 killed, 4,749 wounded, 405 captured/missing)

The Battle of Seven Pines, also known as the Battle of Fair Oaks or Fair Oaks Station, took place on May 31 and June 1, 1862, in Henrico County, Virginia, as part of the Peninsula campaign of the American Civil War.

The Union's Army of the Potomac, commanded by Maj. Gen. George B. McClellan, had moved up the Virginia Peninsula, reaching the outskirts of Richmond, the Confederate capital. On May 31, Confederate General Joseph E. Johnston attempted to overwhelm two Federal corps that appeared isolated south of the Chickahominy River.

The Confederate assaults, although poorly coordinated, succeeded in driving back the IV Corps and inflicting heavy casualties. Reinforcements arrived, and both sides fed more and more troops into the action. Supported by the III Corps and Maj. Gen. John Sedgwick's division of Maj. Gen. Edwin V. Sumner's II Corps (which crossed the rain-swollen river on Grapevine Bridge), the Federal position was finally stabilized.

Gen. Johnston was seriously wounded during the action, and command of the Confederate army devolved temporarily to Maj. Gen. G.W. Smith.

On June 1, the Confederates renewed their assaults against the Federals, who had brought up more reinforcements, but made little headway. Both sides claimed victory.

Although the battle was tactically inconclusive, it was the largest battle in the eastern theater up to that time (and second only to Shiloh in terms of casualties thus far, about 11,000 total). Gen. Johnston's injury also had profound influence on the war: it led to the appointment of Robert E. Lee as Confederate commander. The more aggressive Lee initiated the Seven Days Battles, leading to a Union retreat in late June. Seven Pines therefore marked the closest Union forces came to Richmond until near the end of the war.

== Background ==
Johnston withdrew his 75,000-man army from the Virginia Peninsula as McClellan's army pursued him and approached the Confederate capital of Richmond. Johnston's defensive line began at the James River at Drewry's Bluff, site of the recent Confederate naval victory, and extended counterclockwise so that his center and left were behind the Chickahominy River, a natural barrier in the spring when it turned the land to the east of Richmond into swamps. Johnston's men burned most of the bridges over the Chickahominy and settled into strong defensive positions north and east of the city. McClellan positioned his 105,000-man army to focus on the northeast sector, for two reasons. First, the Pamunkey River, which ran roughly parallel to the Chickahominy, offered a line of communication that could enable McClellan to get around Johnston's left flank. Second, McClellan anticipated the arrival of the I Corps under Maj. Gen. Irvin McDowell, scheduled to march south from Fredericksburg to reinforce his army, and thus needed to protect their avenue of approach.

The Army of the Potomac pushed slowly up the Pamunkey, establishing supply bases at Eltham's Landing, Cumberland Landing, and White House Landing. White House, the plantation of W.H.F. "Rooney" Lee, son of General Robert E. Lee, became McClellan's base of operations. Using the Richmond and York River Railroad, McClellan could bring his heavy siege artillery to the outskirts of Richmond. He moved slowly and deliberately, reacting to faulty intelligence that led him to believe the Confederates outnumbered him significantly. By the end of May, the army had built a few bridges across the Chickahominy and was facing Richmond, straddling the river, with one third of the Army south of the river, two thirds north.

== Opposing forces ==
=== Union ===
Key Union Commanders
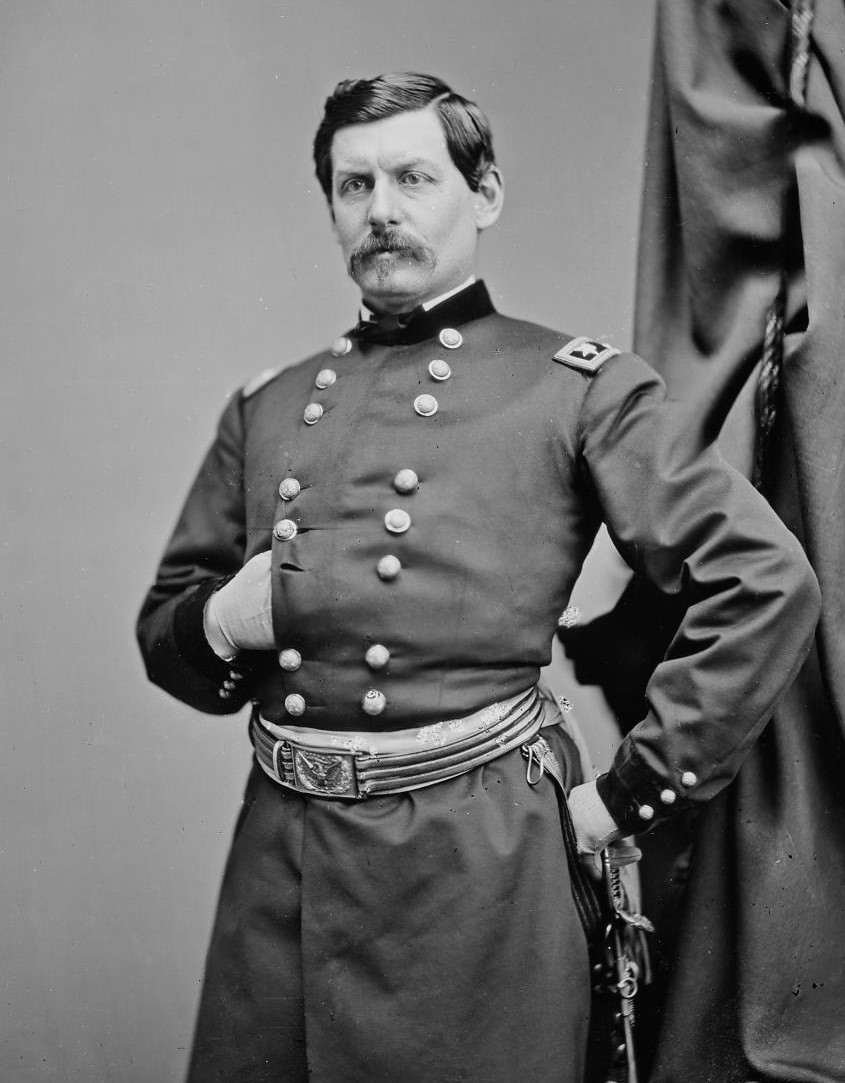
Maj. Gen.
George B. McClellan,
Commanding

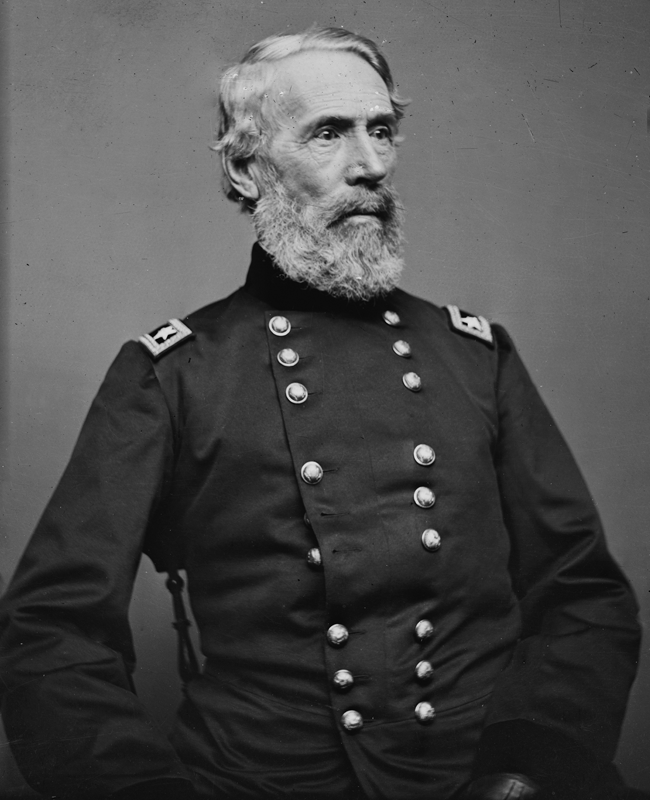
Brig. Gen.
Edwin V. Sumner

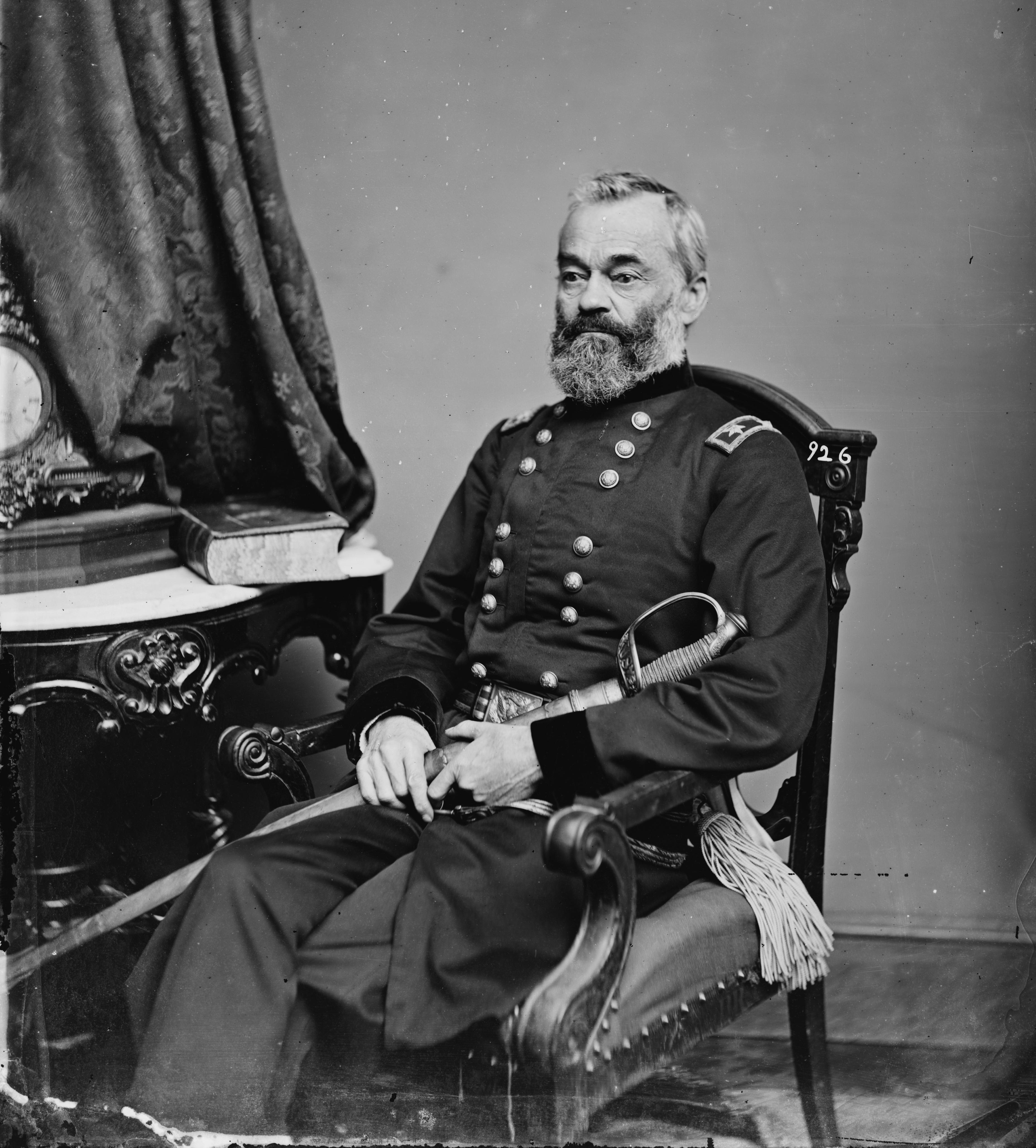
Brig. Gen.
Samuel P. Heintzelman

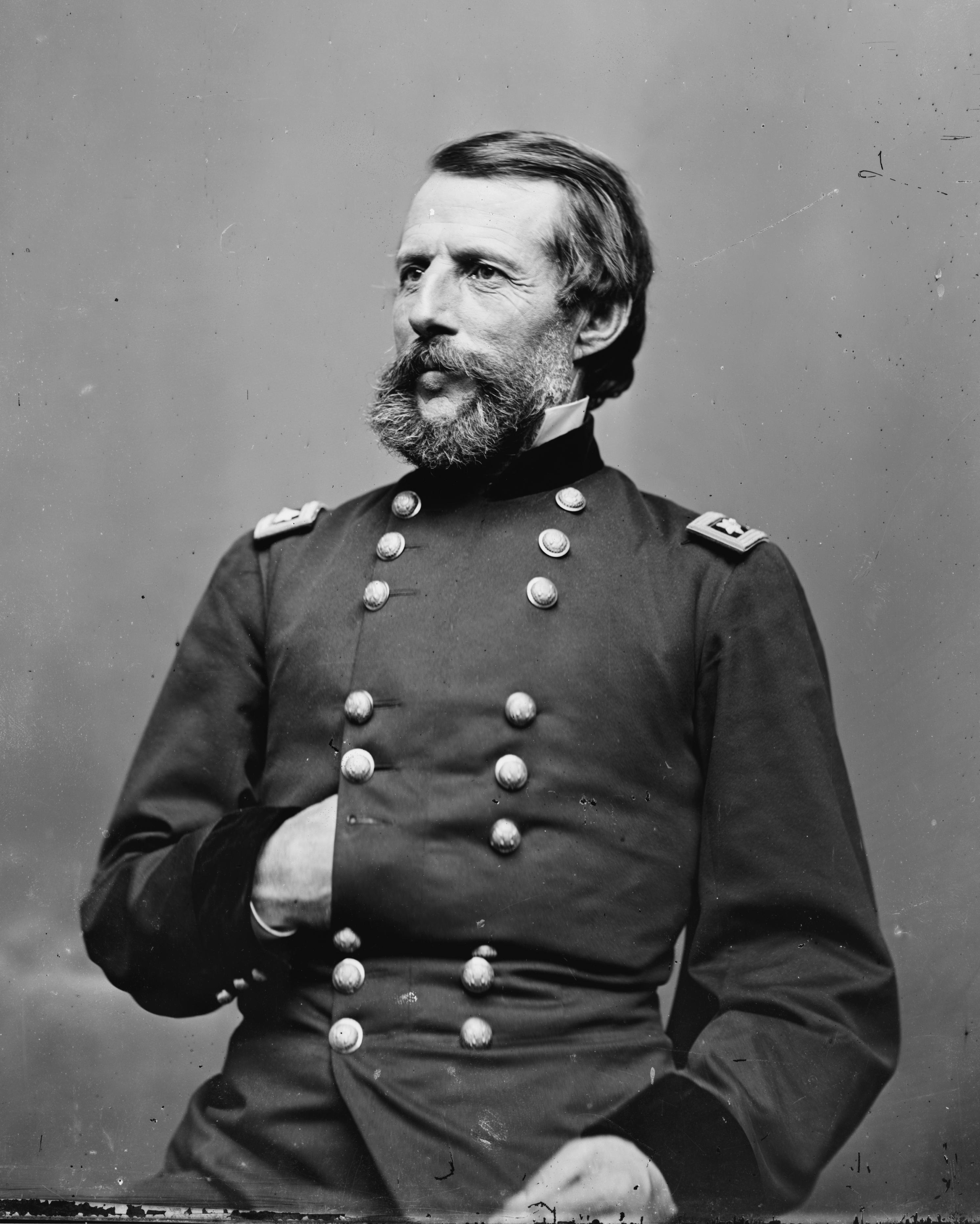
Brig. Gen.
Erasmus D. Keyes

The Union Army of the Potomac of 105,000 men was near the outskirts of Richmond to the northeast, straddling the Chickahominy River. There were three corps north of the river, protecting the Union railroad supply line: the V Corps under Brig. Gen. Fitz John Porter; the VI Corps, under Brig. Gen. William B. Franklin; and the II Corps, under Brig. Gen. Edwin V. Sumner. South of the river were the IV Corps, under Brig. Gen. Erasmus D. Keyes, in a position far forward and close to the Confederate lines; and the III Corps, under Brig. Gen. Samuel P. Heintzelman. At the start of the battle on May 31, McClellan was confined to bed, ill with a flare-up of his chronic malaria.

=== Confederate ===
Key Confederate Commanders
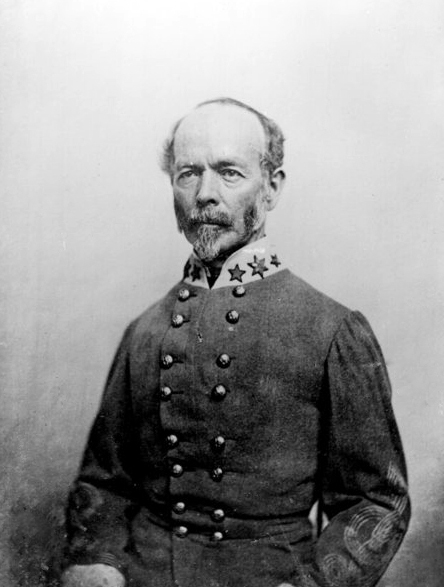
General
Joseph E. Johnston,
Commanding

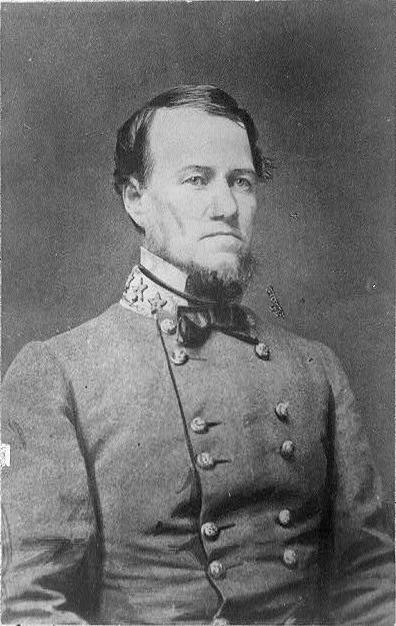
Maj. Gen.
Gustavus W. Smith

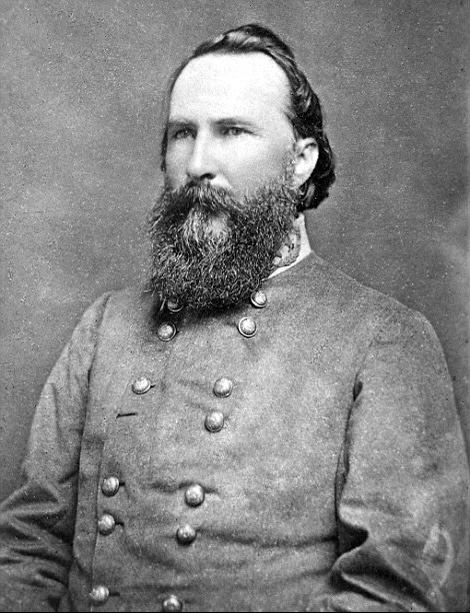
Maj. Gen.
James Longstreet

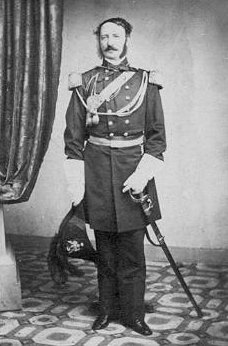
Maj. Gen.
John B. Magruder

Johnston had 60,000 men in his Army of Northern Virginia protecting the defensive works of Richmond in eight divisions commanded by Maj. Gen James Longstreet, Maj. Gen D.H. Hill, Maj. Gen Benjamin Huger, Maj. Gen Gustavus Smith, Maj. Gen A.P. Hill (who had just gotten command of a brand-new division on May 27), Maj. Gen John B. Magruder, Brig. Gen David Rumph Jones, and Maj. Gen Lafayette McLaws. Just prior to the battle, Johnston appointed Longstreet, Smith, and Magruder as wing commanders. Longstreet had the right wing, consisting of his own division, D.H. Hill's, and Huger's. Smith had the left wing, consisting of his division and A.P. Hill's, while Magruder had his division, Jones, and McLaws in the reserve wing. Brig. Gen Richard H. Anderson and Brig. Gen William H.C. Whiting had operational command of Longstreet and Smith's divisions.

== Johnston's plan ==
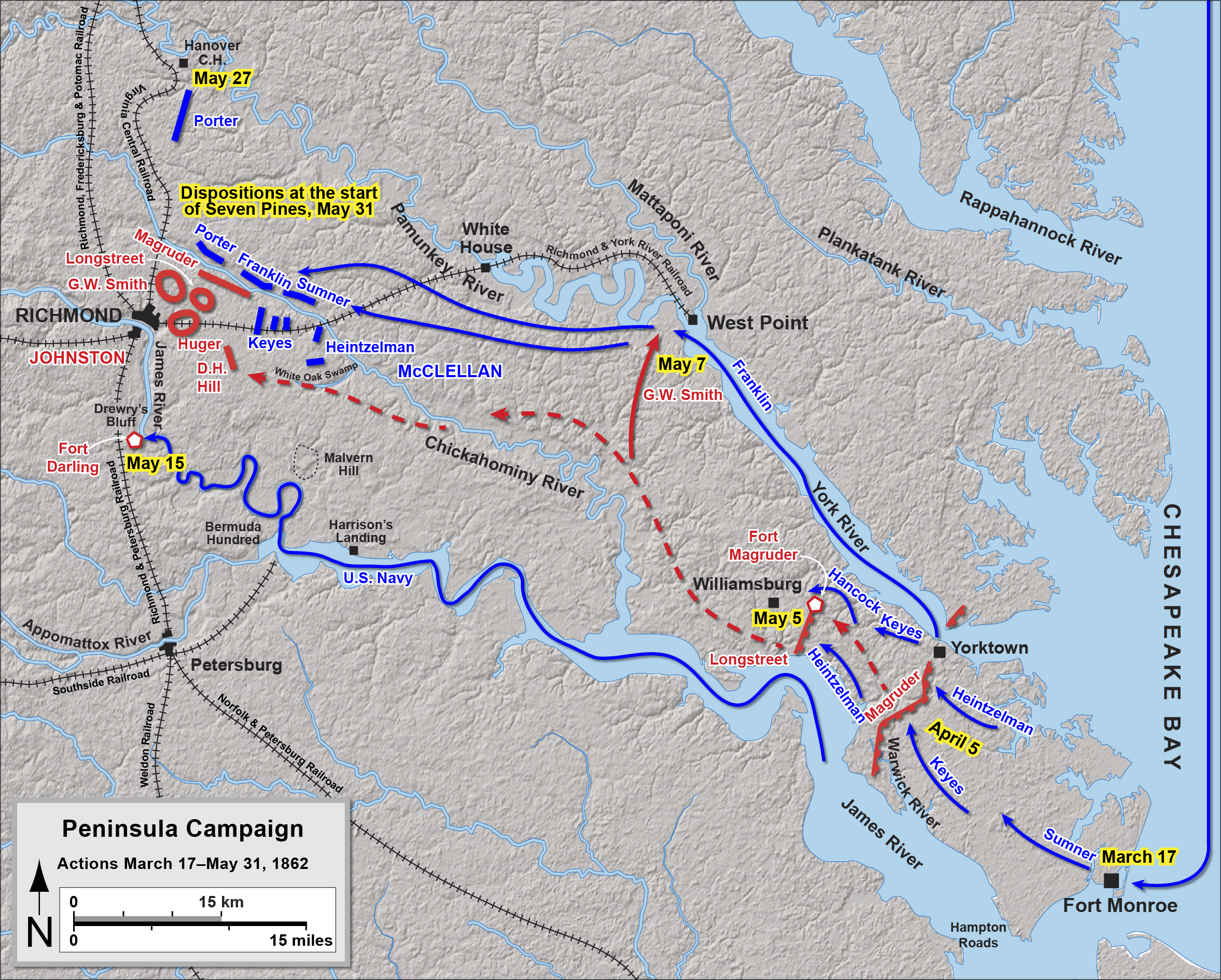
Peninsula campaign, map of events up to the Battle of Seven Pines Confederate Union

Johnston, who had retreated up the Peninsula to the outskirts of Richmond, knew that he could not survive a massive siege and decided to attack McClellan. His original plan was to attack the Union right flank, north of the Chickahominy River, before McDowell's corps, marching south from Fredericksburg, could arrive. However, on May 27, the same day the Battle of Hanover Court House was fought northeast of Richmond, Johnston learned that McDowell's corps had been diverted to the Shenandoah Valley and would not be reinforcing the Army of the Potomac. He decided against attacking across his own natural defense line, the Chickahominy, and planned to capitalize on the Union army's straddle of the river by attacking the two corps south of the river, leaving them isolated from the other three corps north of the river.

If executed correctly, Johnston would engage three quarters of his army (22 of its 29 infantry brigades, about 51,000 men) against the 33,000 men in the III and IV Corps. The Confederate attack plan was complex, calling for the divisions of A. P. Hill and Magruder to engage lightly and distract the Union forces north of the river, while Longstreet, commanding the main attack south of the river, was to converge on Keyes from three directions: six brigades under Longstreet's immediate command and four brigades under D. H. Hill were to advance on separate roads at a crossroads known as Seven Pines (because of seven large pine trees clustered at that location); three brigades under Huger were assigned to support Hill's right; Whiting's division was to follow Longstreet's column as a reserve. The plan had an excellent potential for initial success because the division of the IV Corps farthest forward, manning the earthworks a mile west of Seven Pines, was that of Brig. Gen. Silas Casey, 6000 men who were the least experienced and equipped in Keyes's corps. If Keyes could be defeated, the III Corps, to the east, could be pinned against the Chickahominy and overwhelmed.

The complex plan was mismanaged from the start. Johnston chose to issue his orders to Longstreet orally in a long and rambling meeting on May 30. The other generals received written orders that were vague and contradictory. He also failed to notify all of the division commanders that Longstreet was in tactical command south of the river. (This missing detail was a serious oversight because both Huger and Smith technically outranked Longstreet.) On Longstreet's part, he either misunderstood his orders or chose to modify them without informing Johnston. Rather than taking his assigned avenue of advance on the Nine Mile Road, his column joined Hill's on the Williamsburg Road, which not only delayed the advance, but limited the attack to a narrow front with only a fraction of its total force. Exacerbating the problems on both sides was a severe thunderstorm on the night of May 30, which flooded the river, destroyed most of the Union bridges, and turned the roads into morasses of mud.

== Battle ==
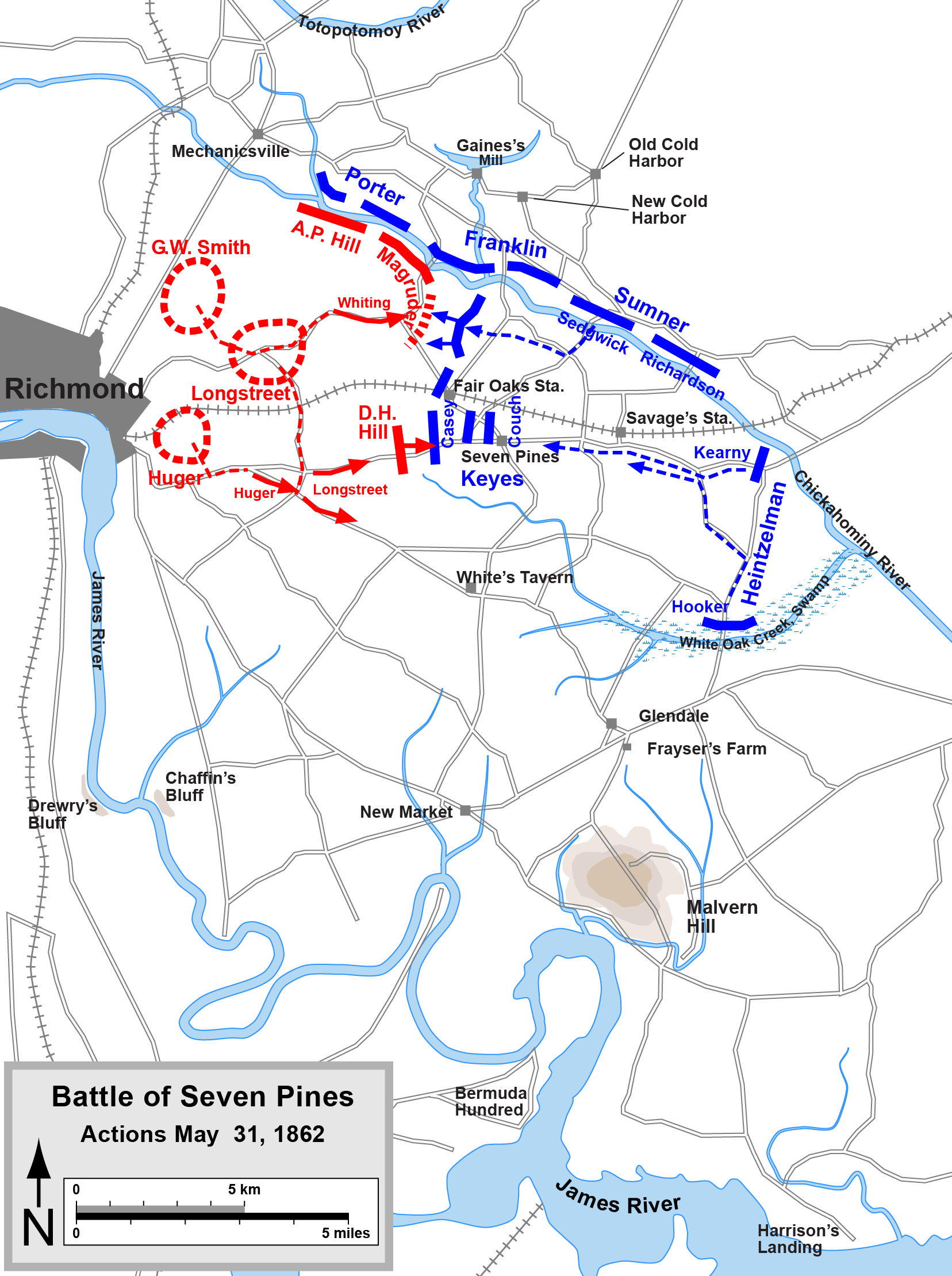
Battle of Seven Pines

The attack got off to a bad start on May 31 when Longstreet marched down the Charles City Road and turned onto the Williamsburg Road instead of the Nine Mile Road. Huger's orders had not specified a time that the attack was scheduled to start and he was not awakened until he heard a division marching nearby. Johnston and his second-in-command, Smith, unaware of Longstreet's location or Huger's delay, waited at their headquarters for word of the start of the battle. Five hours after the scheduled start, at 1 p.m., D.H. Hill became impatient and sent his brigades forward against Casey's division.

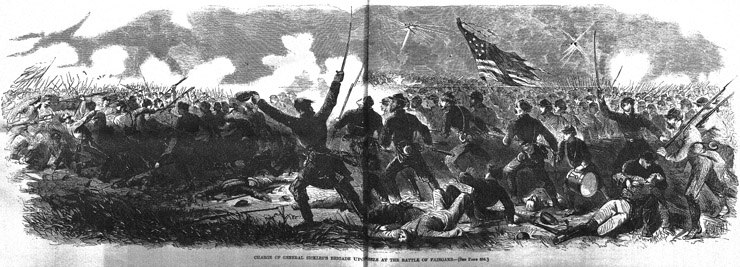
Charge of General Sickles's brigade upon rebels at the Battle of Fair oaks. Illustration from Harper's Weekly, June 21, 1862

Hill's division, some 10,000 men strong, came charging out of the woods. The 100th and 81st New York regiments had been placed up front as heavy skirmish lines, and Hill's assault rolled completely over them. Casey's line, manned by inexperienced troops, buckled with some men retreating, but fought fiercely for possession of their earthworks, resulting in heavy casualties on both sides. The Confederates only engaged four brigades of the thirteen on their right flank that day, so they did not hit with the power that they could have concentrated on this weak point in the Union line. Casey sent a frantic request for help, but Keyes was slow in responding. Eventually the mass of Confederates broke through, seized a Union redoubt, and Casey's men retreated to the second line of defensive works at Seven Pines. During this period, both of the high commanders were unaware of the severity of the battle. As late as 2:30 p.m., Heintzelman reported to McClellan, still sick in bed, that he had received no word from Keyes. Johnston was only 2 1/2 miles from the front, but an acoustic shadow prevented him from hearing the sounds of cannons and musketry and he and his staff did not know the battle had begun until 4 p.m. Hill, whose four brigades had been fighting alone for almost four hours, sent a message to Longstreet requesting reinforcements, but Longstreet sent forward only Richard Anderson's brigade. Brig. Gen Robert Rodes went down wounded in the desperate fighting around Seven Pines. Col. John B. Gordon of the 6th Alabama, a future major general, took over command of Rodes's brigade. Most of the officers in the 6th Alabama went down, although Gordon himself survived the battle without an injury despite his clothing and canteen being pierced by several bullets. Gordon also glimpsed his 19-year-old brother Augustus, a captain in the regiment, lying among a pile of dead and dying men with a chest wound, but with the battle raging, had no time to stop and tend to him (Augustus Gordon ultimately survived his injury). Rodes' brigade in total lost more than 50% of its strength. Also wounded was Brig. Gen Gabriel Rains, a few days shy of his 59th birthday and one of the oldest officers in the Army of the Northern Virginia. Command of his brigade devolved on Col. Alfred Colquitt of the 6th Georgia, who would eventually be appointed permanent commander of the brigade.

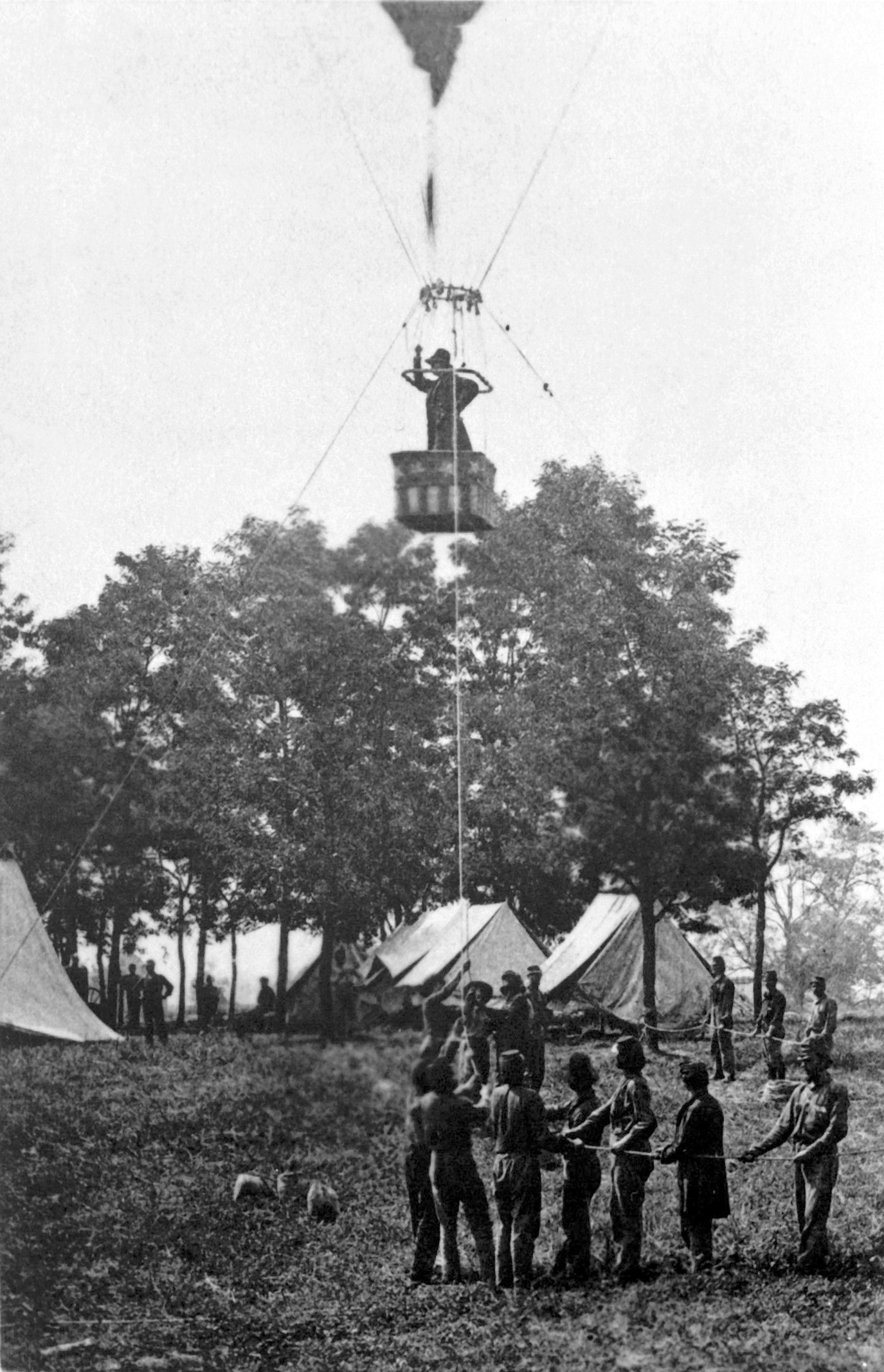
Prof. Lowe ascending in the Intrepid to observe the Battle of Seven Pines

The Army of the Potomac was accompanied by the Union Army Balloon Corps commanded by Prof. Thaddeus S. C. Lowe, who had established two balloon camps on the north side of the river, one at Gaines's Farm and one at Mechanicsville. Lowe reported on May 29 the buildup of Confederate forces to the left of New Bridge or in front of the Fair Oaks train station. With constant rain on May 30 and heavy winds the morning of May 31, the aerostats Washington and Intrepid did not launch until noon. Lowe observed Confederate troops moving in battle formation and this information was relayed verbally to McClellan's headquarters by 2 p.m. Lowe continued to send reports from the Intrepid via telegraph the remainder of May 31. On June 1, Lowe reported that the Confederate barracks to the left of Richmond as being free from smoke. McClellan did not follow up on this information with a counterattack by his corps north of the Chickahominy River.

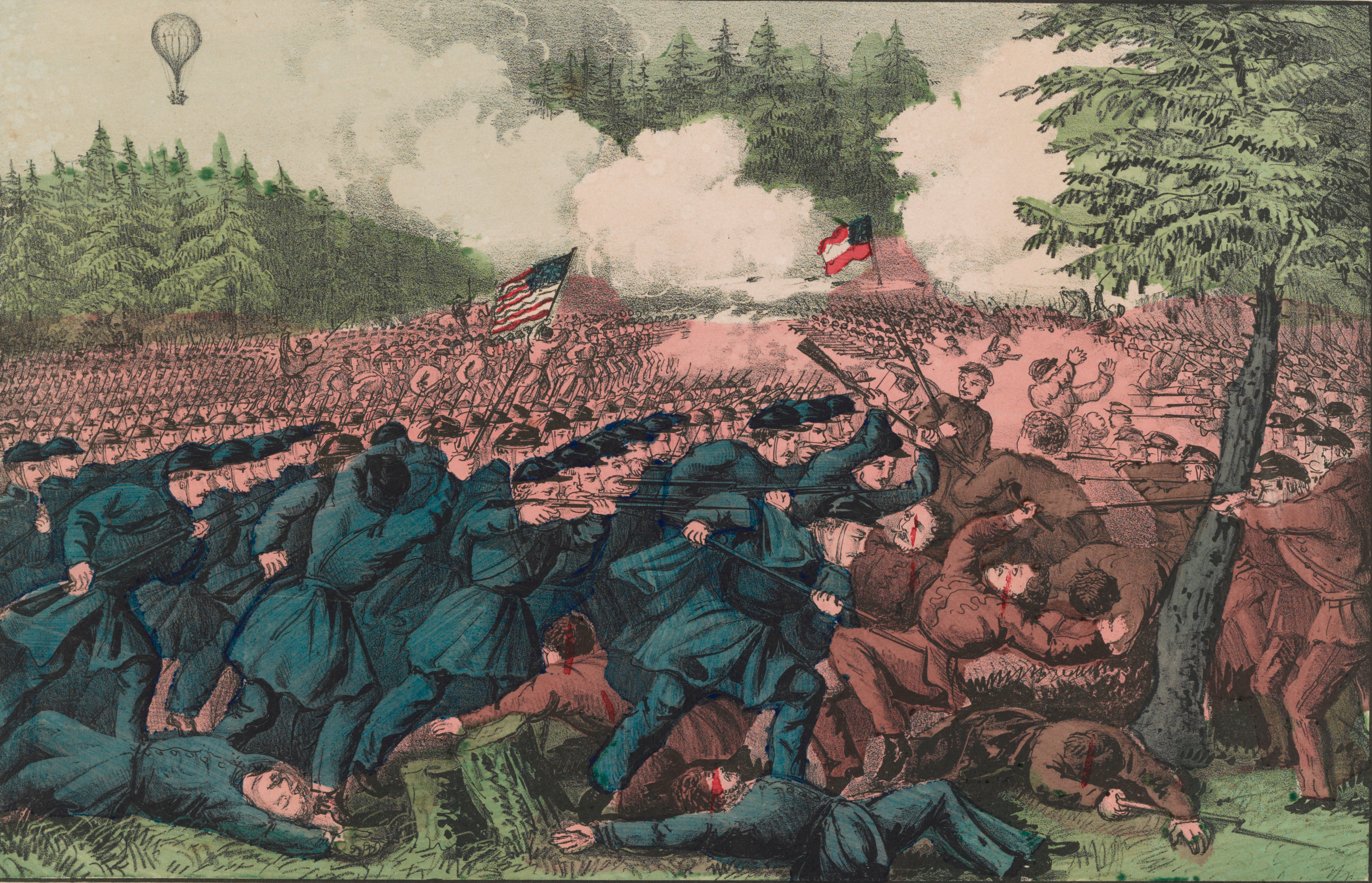
The Battle of Fair Oaks, Va. by Currier and Ives (1862)

Around 1:00 p.m., Hill, now strengthened by the arrival of Richard Anderson's brigade, hit the secondary Union line near Seven Pines, which was manned by the remnants of Casey's division, the IV Corps division of Brig. Gen. Darius N. Couch, and Brig. Gen. Philip Kearny's division from Heintzelman's III Corps. Hill organized a flanking maneuver, sending four regiments under Col. Micah Jenkins from Longstreet's command to attack Keyes's right flank. The attack collapsed the Federal line back to the Williamsburg Road, a mile and a half beyond Seven Pines. Meanwhile, another of Longstreet's brigades under Col. James L. Kemper, arrived on the field and charged the Union lines, but artillery fire forced them to retreat. The fighting in that part of the line died out by 7:30 p.m. During the evening, Longstreet himself arrived on the field along with the remaining four brigades of his division, as well as the three brigades of Huger's division. On the Union side, Brig. Gen Israel Richardson's division of the II Corps arrived on the field, along with Joe Hooker's division of the III Corps (minus one brigade and the division artillery which were left guarding the bridges over White Oak Swamp).

Just before Hill's attack began, Johnston received a note at approximately 4:00 pm from Longstreet requesting that he join the battle, the first news he had heard of the fighting. Johnston went forward on the Nine Mile Road, with a five brigade division led by Brig. Gen. William Chase Whiting. Hours earlier that day, Whiting had been elevated into command of Maj. Gen. Gustavus Smith's division. As the lead regiment of the division, led by Col. Dorsey Pender, 6th NC, reached the railroad crossing artillery guns opened on Pender's advance. This opened the segment of the Battle of Seven Pines to be known as the Battle of Fair Oaks Station. The guns were a part of Brig. Gen John Abercrombie's brigade of Couch's division and they began to put up a stiff resistance. Whiting advanced his former brigade, commanded by Col. Evander Law, to attack the Union artillery off to his left, but was stopped by Abercrombie's brigade and his four artillery pieces. Meanwhile, the commander of the II Corps, Brig. Gen Edwin V. Sumner, had brought his command into action from its entrenchments north of the Chickahominy. When told that crossing the rain-swollen river was impossible, Sumner replied "Impossible!? Sir, I tell you I can cross. I am ordered!" The first II Corps brigade to arrive on the field was Brig. Gen Willis Gorman's brigade of Brig. Gen John Sedgwick's division, which contacted the attack of Col. Evander Law's brigade. Law's attack was initiated by Col. William Dorsey Pender of the 6th NC and was later assisted by the brigades of Brig. Gen. J. Johnston Pettigrew and Col. Wade Hampton III. The three brigades experienced no success as Sumner brought forth two additional brigades and another battery of artillery from Sedgwick's division. During the final attack, Confederate Brig. Gen. Robert Hatton, one of the Army of Virginia's newest brigadiers, having just been promoted from colonel of the 7th Tennessee on May 23, 1862, was shot in the head leading his brigade into action and died instantly. Hampton, meanwhile, was shot in the ankle. Brig. Gen J. Johnston Pettigrew was gravely wounded and left for dead on the field, later being taken prisoner by Sedgwick's division. The repeated assaults on Sedgwick's line were unsuccessful, as the latter's artillery also pounded Whiting's troops, who had no artillery to answer back. A final surge by Whiting's four brigades resulted in a heavy loss of casualties as Sumner mounted a counterattack that drove the Confederate force from the field. It was after this counterattack that Pettigrew was discovered and sent to a Union field hospital for the care of his wounds. Shortly before Sumner's counterattack, Johnston received two wounds and was removed from the field. Command of the army transferred to Maj. Gen. Gustavus Smith. With darkness approaching, over 1200 casualties, and most of his officers killed or wounded, Whiting called off the attacks. Sedgwick's division had lost less than 400 men. Two of Magruder's brigades reached the field at dusk, but had no involvement in any of the fighting. Whiting's fifth brigade, the famous Texas Brigade of Brig. Gen John B. Hood, had not fought either; it had been sent off to reinforce Longstreet and was stationed in the woods some distance to the west of Fair Oak Station.

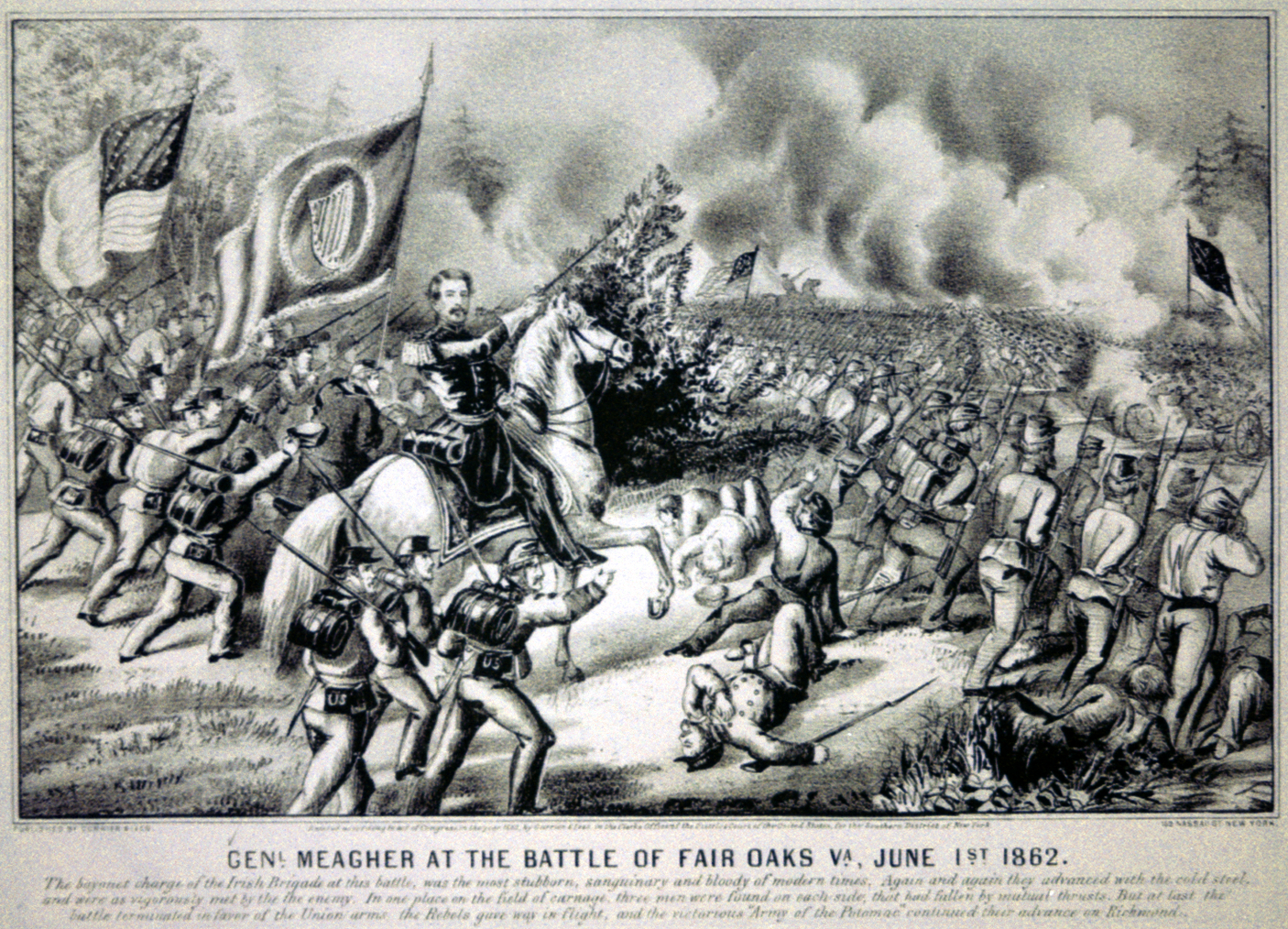
General Thomas Francis Meagher at the Battle of Fair Oaks, June 1, 1862

The most historically significant incident of the day occurred around dusk, when Johnston was struck in the right shoulder by a bullet, immediately followed by a shell fragment hitting him in the chest. He fell unconscious from his horse with a broken right shoulder blade and two broken ribs and was evacuated to Richmond. G.W. Smith assumed temporary command of the army. Smith, plagued with ill health, was indecisive about the next steps for the battle and made a bad impression on Confederate President Jefferson Davis and General Robert E. Lee, Davis's military adviser. After the end of fighting the following day, Davis replaced Smith with Lee as commander of the Army of Northern Virginia.

During the night of May 31 – June 1, scouts in Israel Richardson's division reported two Confederate regiments camped only about 100 yards away. Richardson declined to make a risky night attack, but had his troops form a line of battle just in case. By daybreak however, the enemy regiments had withdrawn from their exposed location. At 6:30 am, the Confederates resumed their attacks. Two of Huger's three brigades, commanded by Brig. Gens William Mahone and Lewis Armistead (the third under Brig. Gen Albert G. Blanchard was held in reserve) assaulted Richardson's division and momentarily drove part of it back, but Richardson's men rallied. They were reinforced by Brig. Gen David B. Birney's brigade of Kearny's division, which had not been engaged the previous day as Birney had accidentally taken the wrong road and gotten lost. He was arrested by Heintzelman for disobeying orders and the brigade was temporarily commanded by Col. J. H. Hobart Ward of the 38th New York (Heintzelman attempted to have Birney court-martialed, but a military tribunal cleared him of all charges and he was restored to command of his brigade two weeks later). After fierce fighting, Huger's division was forced to retreat. In his official report of the battle, Mahone stated his casualties at 338 men. Armistead's report did not give a casualty figure, but his losses were undoubtedly heavy as well. Pickett's brigade, to the right of Armistead, lost 350 men. On the Union side, total losses in Richardson and Birney's outfits numbered 948 men, including Brig. Gen Oliver O. Howard, whose right arm was shattered by a Minie ball, necessitating an amputation that kept Howard out of action for months. Approximately 60% of Richardson's total casualties came from Howard's brigade. To the south, the brigades of Roger Pryor and Cadmus Wilcox were attacked by Hooker's division. Although both brigades resisted stubbornly, the order was given to retreat, which they did with some reluctance. By mid-morning, the Confederates withdrew to Casey's earthworks west of Seven Pines and the fighting ended.

== Aftermath ==
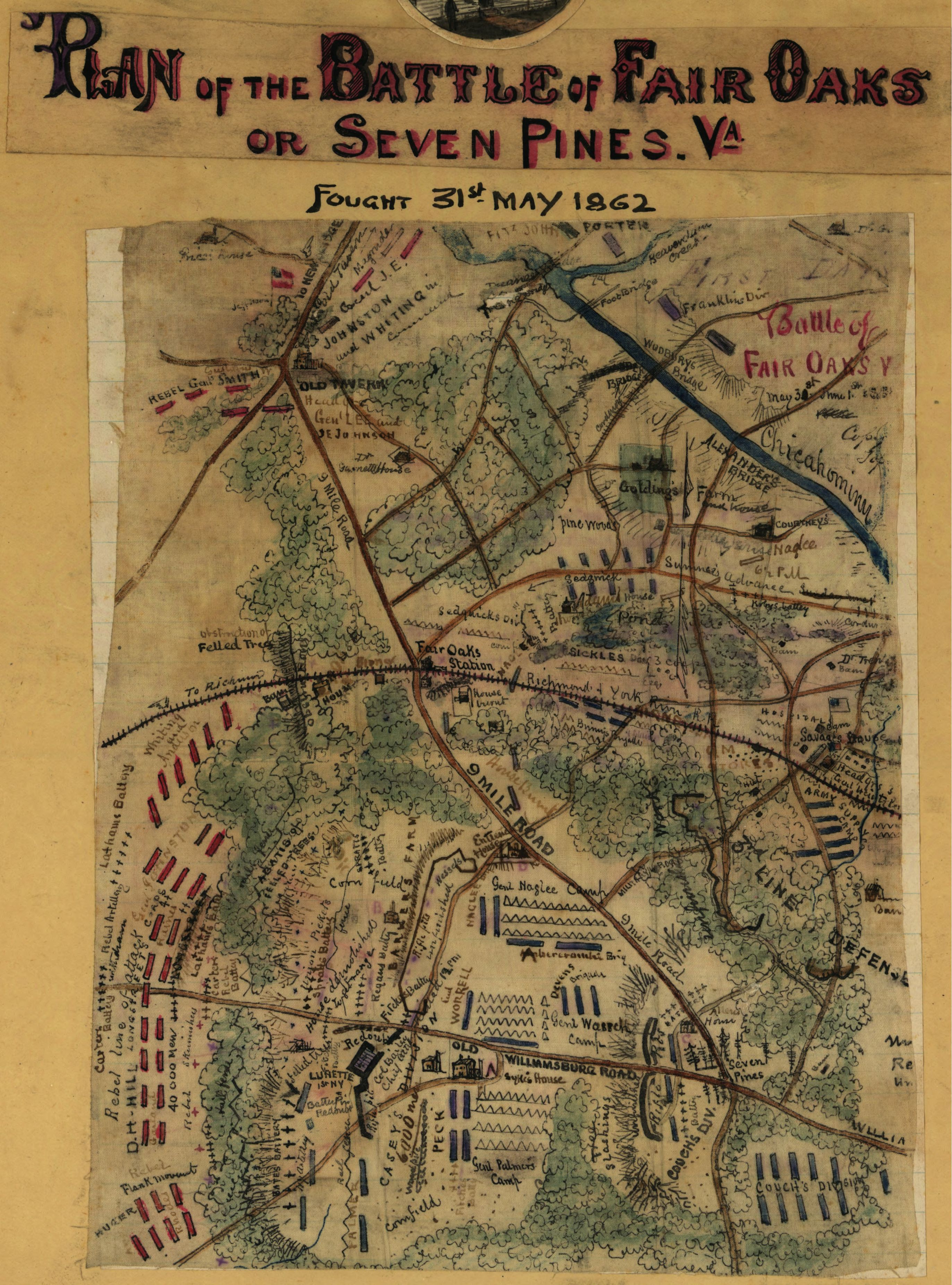
Robert Knox Sneden's map of Battle of Fair Oaks/Seven Pines 31 May 1862 showing 9 mile Road and the Williamsburg Road

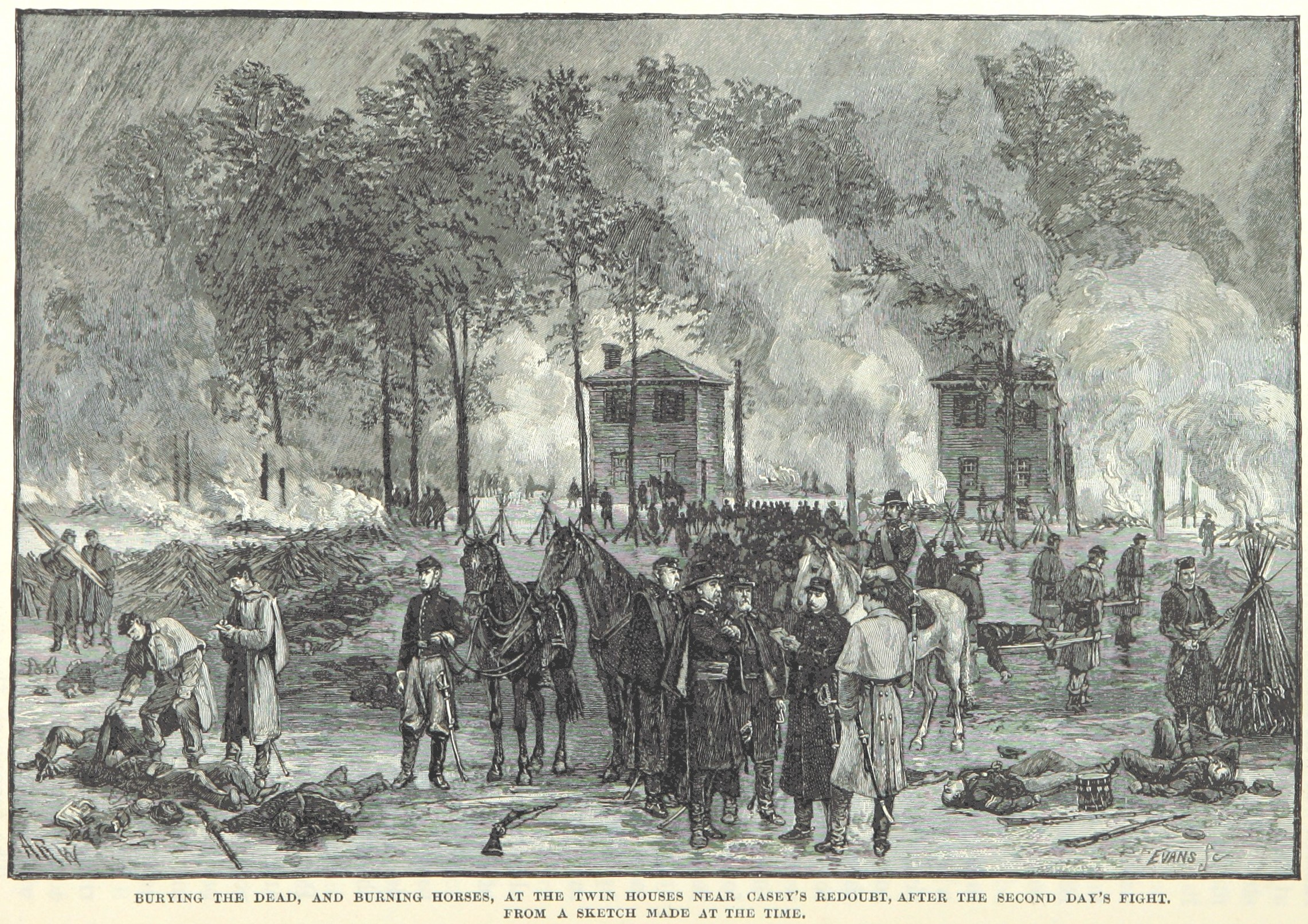
Burying the dead and burning dead horses after the battle

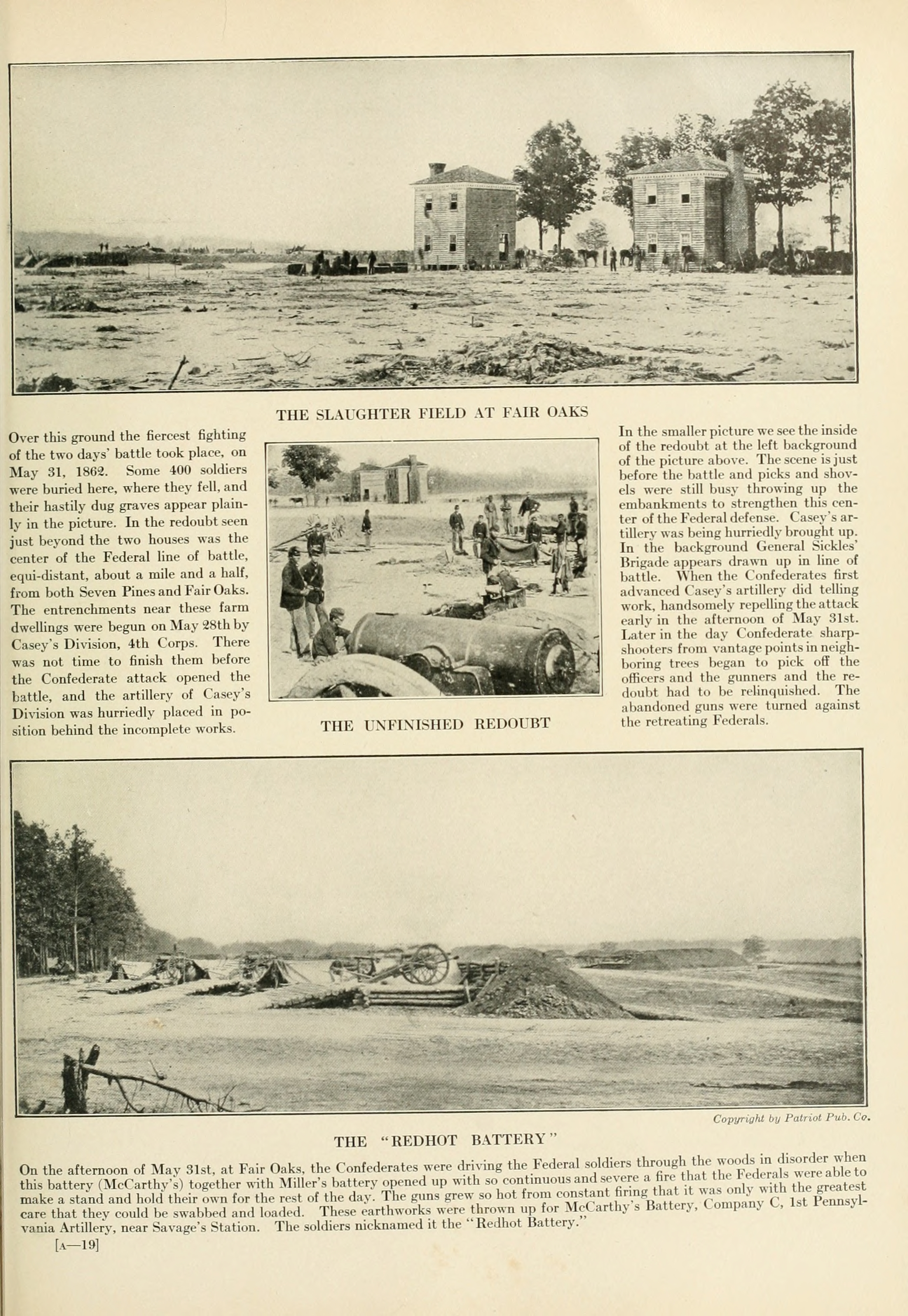
Top:Looking toward Richmond, the grove stands between the Williamsburg stage road and the twin farm-houses which front squarely on the road, perhaps 300 feet away. Casey Redoubt (can be Seen indistinctly on the left background); in the foreground are see the graves of 400 soldiers. The Middle picture shows the twin farmhouses from Casey Redoubt in foreground. The Bottom picture shows McCarty's Battery, Company C. 1st Pennsylvania Artillery near Savage Station. On May 31, 1862, this battery (Nicknamed "The Redhot Battery") and Miller's Battery opened up so hot a continuous fire on the Confederates who were driving the Federals is disorder that the Federals were able to make a stand.

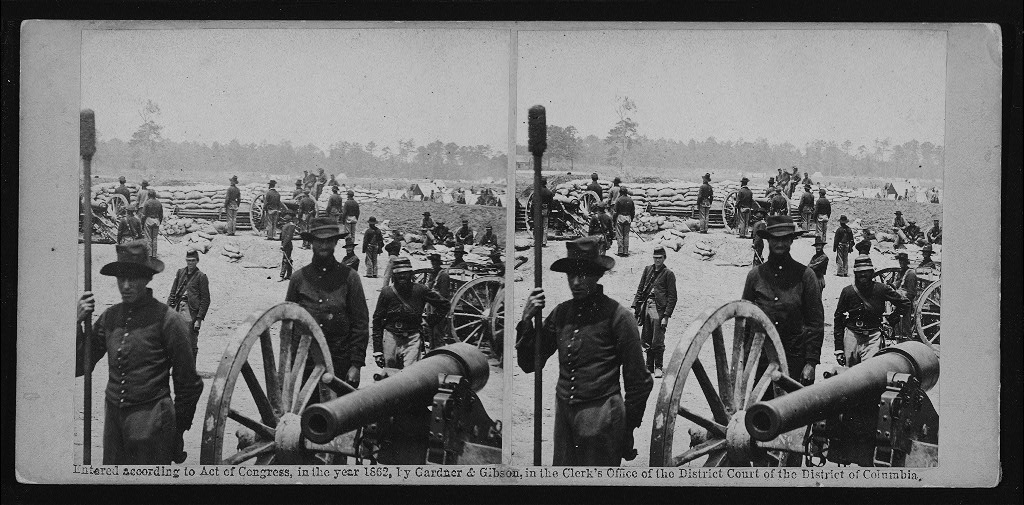
Stero card of photograph by Alexander Gardner and James Gibson showing after the Battle of Seven Pines-Pettit's Battery in Fort Richardson, in front of Fair Oaks Station, between the nine-mile road and the Railroad.

Both sides claimed victory with roughly equal casualties, but neither side's accomplishment was impressive. George B. McClellan's advance on Richmond was halted and the Army of Northern Virginia fell back into the Richmond defensive works. Union casualties were 5,031 (790 killed, 3,594 wounded, 647 captured or missing) and Confederate 6,134 (980 killed, 4,749 wounded, 405 captured or missing), making it the second largest and bloodiest battle of the war to date after Shiloh eight weeks earlier. The battle was frequently remembered by the Union soldiers as the Battle of Fair Oaks Station because that is where they did their best fighting, whereas the Confederates, for the same reason, called it Seven Pines. Historian Stephen W. Sears remarked that its current common name, Seven Pines, is the most appropriate because it was at the crossroads of Seven Pines that the heaviest fighting and highest casualties occurred. A contemporary map drawn by private Julius Honore Bayol of the 5th Alabama Infantry Regiment, refers simply to the engagement as having occurred at the "Battlefield of 31st of May and 1st June, 62."

Despite claiming victory, McClellan was shaken by the experience. He wrote to his wife, "I am tired of the sickening sight of the battlefield, with its mangled corpses & poor suffering wounded! Victory has no charms for me when purchased at such cost." He redeployed all of his army except for the V Corps south of the river, and although he continued to plan for a siege and the capture of Richmond, he lost the strategic initiative. Casey's division was unjustly blamed for the near-disaster, and McClellan had Casey removed from command. The hapless division would play no further role in the campaign, being relegated to guard duty at Harrison's Landing along the James River, and was left behind permanently on the peninsula after the Army of the Potomac returned to Washington D.C. in early August. An offensive begun by the new Confederate commander, Gen. Robert E. Lee, would be planned while the Union troops passively sat in the outskirts of Richmond. The Seven Days Battles of June 25 through July 1, 1862, drove the Union Army back to the James River and saved the Confederate capital.

After taking command, Robert E. Lee embarked on a reorganization of the Confederate army, breaking up and reassigning some brigades, nominating replacements for dead and wounded officers, and removing two brigadiers, Albert G. Blanchard and Raleigh Colston, who had failed to get their units into action during the battle and generally delivered a below-average performance. The change in leadership of the Confederate Army in the field as a result of Seven Pines had a profound effect on the war. On June 24, 1862, McClellan's massive Army of the Potomac was within 6 miles (9.7 km) of the Confederate capital of Richmond; Union soldiers wrote that they could hear church bells ringing in the city. Within 90 days, however, Robert E. Lee had driven McClellan from the Peninsula, Pope had been soundly beaten at the Second Battle of Bull Run, and the battle lines were 20 miles (32 km) from the Union capital in Washington. It would take almost two more years before the Union Army again got that close to Richmond, and almost three years before it finally captured it.

In MacKinlay Kantor's Pulitzer Prize-winning novel Andersonville (1955), Henry Wirz, one of the main characters, reflects often upon the circumstances of the battle, in which he purportedly received a severe arm injury ("God damn the Yankee who did this to me").

== See also ==
- Troop engagements of the American Civil War, 1862
- Peninsula campaign and Siege of Yorktown (1862)
- List of costliest American Civil War land battles
