= J. H. Hobart Ward =

American general (1823–1903)

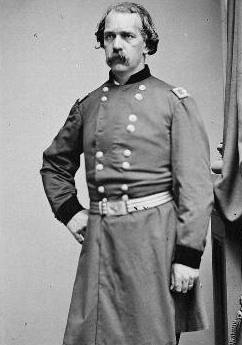
- John Henry Hobart Ward
- Born: June 17, 1823; New York City, U.S.
- Died: July 24, 1903 (aged 80); Monroe, New York, U.S.
- Military career
- Branch: United States Army
- Service years: 1842–1847 (U.S.); 1851–1859 (NY Militia); 1861–1864 (U.S.)
- Rank: Brigadier general
- Conflicts: Mexican–American War; American Civil War

John Henry Hobart Ward (June 17, 1823 – July 24, 1903) was an American soldier who fought in the Mexican–American War and in the American Civil War. Ward joined the army in 1842 and fought in multiple battles in the Mexican–American war, including the Battle of Monterrey, where he was wounded. After leaving the army, he served successively as the assistant commissary general and commissary general for the state of New York. With the outbreak of the American Civil War in 1861, Ward rejoined the army, and became the colonel of the 38th New York Infantry Regiment. Ward and his regiment were engaged in the First Battle of Bull Run and in several battles in the Peninsula campaign. He was promoted to command a brigade after the Battle of Chantilly in September 1862.

Ward then led his brigade at the battles of Fredericksburg, Chancellorsville, and Gettysburg. By early 1864, he had developed a strong reputation as a military leader, although there had been an incident when he panicked and fled the field during a night attack at Chancellorsville. On May 6, 1864, during the Battle of the Wilderness, Ward left his command and was observed riding to the rear on an artillery caisson. Six days later, during the Battle of Spotsylvania Court House, Ward was found to be intoxicated by two superior officers. He was removed from command that day, and was arrested on June 12, although he was given an honorable discharge in July and was not sent to a trial. After his removal from military service, Ward served as a clerk in the New York court system, and was struck and killed by a train while vacationing in 1903.

== Early life and Mexican War ==
John Henry Hobart Ward was born on June 17, 1823, in New York City. Both his father and grandfather had died of the effects of wounds suffered while serving in the United States military. After receiving an education from Trinity Collegiate School, he enlisted as a private in the 7th United States Infantry Regiment in August 1842, at the age of 18. He was promoted to sergeant major in 1845. While Ward was in the army, the Mexican-American War began. He was present at the Siege of Fort Brown in Texas, which was an unsuccessful attempt by the Mexican Army to capture Fort Brown in May 1846. Ward later fought in the Battle of Monterrey, where he was wounded, and was also present at the capture of Vera Cruz. Ward was additionally present at the battles of Cerro Gordo and Huamantla. He later married one of the local women of Vera Cruz. According to historian Ezra J. Warner, Ward left the army in April 1847, while historian Larry Tagg states that he remained until 1851. Ward was next the New York state assistant commissary general, a position which he held from 1851 until 1855, when he took over the role of state commissary general itself. He remained in that position until 1859.

== Civil War service ==
After the outbreak of the American Civil War, Ward used his military experience and political connections to gain a commission as colonel in the 38th New York Infantry Regiment. Recruited from the populace of New York and organized by the state, the unit mustered in to the Union Army on June 3, 1861. On July 21, Ward led the regiment in the First Battle of Bull Run. Part of Orlando B. Willcox's brigade, the 38th New York deployed behind two Union artillery batteries on Henry House Hill. The regiment later fell back towards the rear under heavy artillery fire. Later in the battle, Ward led the regiment in a charge against Confederate positions on Henry House Hill, along with the 69th New York Infantry Regiment. The two Union regiments took a foothold on the hill, but were driven off by Confederate reinforcements. Willcox was wounded and captured during the battle, and Ward temporarily took command of the brigade. Willcox's official report of the action praised Ward. The battle ended in a rout, with Union troops fleeing the field in disorganization.

Ward then saw service in the Peninsula campaign in early 1862, fighting at the battles of Yorktown, Williamsburg, and Seven Pines. A charge by the 38th New York at Williamsburg brought praise to Ward from Brigadier General Phil Kearny, and Ward gained further adulation from Kearny, III Corps commander Brigadier General Samuel P. Heintzelman, and Brigadier General Joseph Hooker for his performance at Seven Pines. At that battle, Ward had briefly led the brigade his regiment was in, after Brigadier General David B. Birney was temporarily removed from command. Ward and his men were only minimally involved in the Seven Days' Battles, and while he was engaged in the Second Battle of Bull Run and the Battle of Chantilly, his overall participation in the Second Bull Run campaign was minimal. Kearny had been killed in September at Chantilly, and when Birney advanced to divisional command to replace Kearny, Ward took over the brigade.

On October 4, 1862, Ward was promoted to brigadier general. At the Battle of Fredericksburg, Ward's brigade was engaged against the portion of the Confederate line defended by Stonewall Jackson's men. After other Union troops were repulsed, Ward led his brigade in an attack. Ward's brigade was repulsed, having suffered heavy casualties. He continued to lead his brigade at the Battle of Chancellorsville. At Chancellorsville, on the night of May 2/3, 1863, Birney's division made a night attack under orders from III Corps commander Daniel Sickles, with Ward's brigade leading the charge. The attack resulted in chaos, including multiple friendly fire incidents. Ward panicked during the event and rode down two Union soldiers while fleeing to the rear. While his panicked flight at Chancellorsville was an embarrassment for him, Ward's military career suffered no long-term harm from the incident. By this time, Ward had developed an excellent reputation as a combat leader.

By the time of the Battle of Gettysburg in early July 1863, Ward had led his brigade for 10 months, which was longer than most brigade commanders in the Army of the Potomac. At Gettysburg, on July 2, Ward's brigade defended a position near the Devil's Den. When Confederate forces attacked, Ward's brigade fought hard, but was eventually forced to retreat under heavy enemy pressure. Sickles was wounded during the battle, leading to Birney assuming corps command and Ward was advanced to command the division. Ward himself suffered a wound during the battle.

Ward saw further action in an engagement at Kelly's Ford and in the Battle of Wapping Heights after Gettysburg. In early 1864, the Army of the Potomac underwent a reorganization, and Birney's division was transferred to the II Corps. Ward retained a brigade command after the reorganization. Historian Ezra J. Warner wrote that by May 1864, Ward "had been almost universally eulogized by his superiors for bravery and ability". On May 5, during the Battle of the Wilderness, Ward's brigade entered the fighting when it was sent forward to support the line of the Vermont Brigade, which was heavily engaged with Confederate troops.

The next day, Ward's brigade was part of the Union line as it was fighting off Confederate attacks. A brushfire broke out in front of the position of Ward's brigade, and some of the Union soldiers fled in panic, including Ward, who, according to a staff officer, rode a caisson to the rear. Another staff officer claimed to have later encountered Ward on the caisson and to have suggested he dismount and attempt to rally his men. Four days later, in the Battle of Spotsylvania Court House, Ward's men participated in an attack against Confederate lines in the Laurel Hill area. A Confederate shell fragment gave Ward a head wound not long before the attack began. His men succeeded in temporarily breaking the Confederate line, but were not sufficiently supported and were forced to withdraw. May 12, in another phase of the fighting at Spotsylvania Court House, saw Ward's brigade participate in an attack that broke a major hole in the Confederate line.

== Dismissal from command and later life ==
During the fighting on May 12, Birney noted Ward heading for the rear, claiming that he was looking for his horse. Major General Winfield Scott Hancock also noticed Ward behaving recklessly, and concluded that he was drunk. Hancock informed Birney of the matter, and the latter officer agreed that Ward was intoxicated and sent him to the rear. That same day, he was removed from command under charges of "misbehavior and intoxication in the presence of the enemy during the Battle of the Wilderness". Charles Dana, the Assistant Secretary of War, had written a letter dated May 9 stating that Ward had been arrested for "running away in the Wilderness battle". Warner suggests that this letter is evidence that the decision to relieve Ward had already been made by the time that Dana wrote his letter. On June 12, Ward was formally placed under arrest and sent to Fort Monroe.

Ward was never brought to trial; historian Harry W. Pfanz suggests that this was due to his multiple wounds and long military career. He received an honorable discharge on July 18, and the United States Secretary of War refused requests to restore Ward to the service and then hold a trial to ascertain if he was guilty of the charges or not. In his following civilian career, Ward spent 32 years as a clerk with the superior court and the Supreme Court of New York. On July 24, 1903, while on vacation in Monroe, New York, Ward was struck and killed by a train. He received a Masonic funeral in Brooklyn, and his body was then taken to Monroe for permanent burial in the Community Cemetery there.

== See also ==
- List of American Civil War generals (Union)

== Sources ==
- Eicher, John H.; Eicher, David J. (2001). Civil War High Commands. Stanford, California: Stanford University Press. ISBN 978-0-8047-3641-1.
- Eisenhower, John S. D. (2000) [1989]. So Far From God: The U.S. War with Mexico, 1846–1848 (Oklahoma Paperback ed.). Norman, Oklahoma: University of Oklahoma Press. ISBN 978-0-8061-3279-2.
- Gottfried, Bradley M. (2012) [2002]. Brigades of Gettysburg: The Union and Confederate Brigades at the Battle of Gettysburg. New York, New York: Skyhorse Publishing. ISBN 978-1-61608-401-1.
- Pfanz, Harry W. (1987). Gettysburg: The Second Day. Chapel Hill, North Carolina: University of North Carolina Press. ISBN 978-0-8078-4730-5.
- Powell, William H., ed. (1893). Officers of the Army and Navy (Volunteer) Who Served in the Civil War. Philadelphia, Pennsylvania: L. R. Hamersly & Co.
- Rable, George C. (2002). Fredericksburg! Fredericksburg!. Chapel Hill, North Carolina: University of North Carolina Press. ISBN 0-8078-2673-1.
- Rafuse, Ethan S. (2002). A Single Grand Victory: The First Campaign and Battle of Manassas. Scholarly Resources. ISBN 0-8420-2876-5.
- Rhea, Gordon C. (1994). The Battle of the Wilderness May 5-6, 1864. Baton Rouge, Louisiana: Louisiana State University Press. ISBN 0-8071-1873-7.
- Rhea, Gordon C. (1997). The Battles of Spotsylvania Court House and the Road to Yellow Tavern, May 7–12, 1864. Baton Rouge, Louisiana: Louisiana State University Press. ISBN 9780807121368.
- Sears, Stephen W. (1996). Chancellorsville. Boston/New York: Mariner Books. ISBN 978-0-395-87744-9.
- Tagg, Larry (2003) [1998]. The Generals of Gettysburg: The Leaders of America's Greatest Battle. Boston, Massachusetts: Da Capo. ISBN 0-306-81242-8.
- Warner, Ezra J. (2006) [1964]. Generals in Blue: Lives of the Union Commanders. Baton Rouge, Louisiana: Louisiana State University Press. ISBN 0-8071-3149-0.
