= James Rowan O'Beirne =

American soldier (1839–1917)

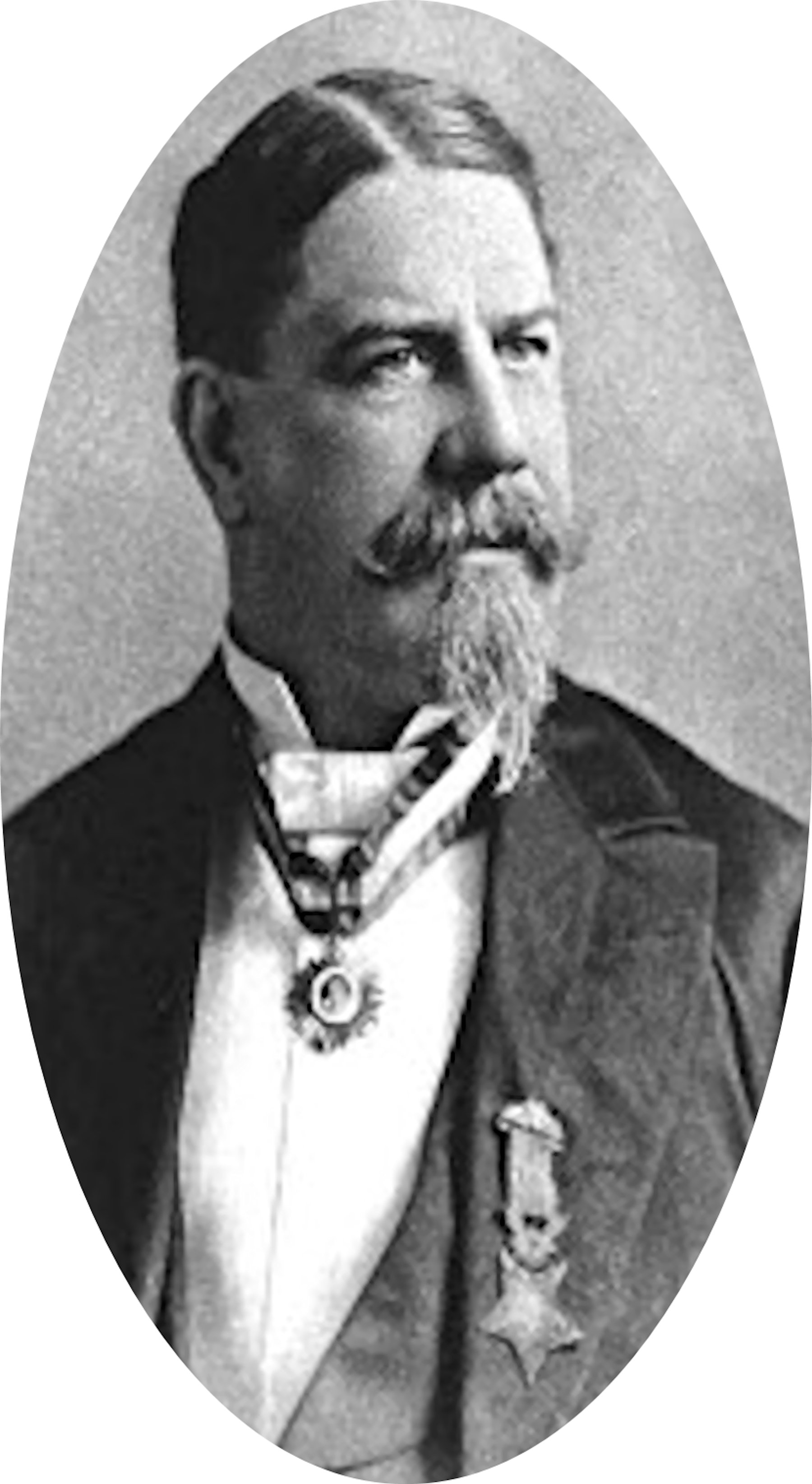
- Born: September 25, 1839; Cappagh, County Roscommon, Ireland
- Died: February 17, 1917 (aged 77); New York City, US
- Alma mater: Fordham University (at that time St. John's College)
- Spouse: Martha Susannah Brennan O'Beirne
- Children: 1
- Military career
- Branch: United States Army
- Service years: 1861–1865
- Rank: Major; Bvt. Brigadier General
- Units: (New York (state)) Company C, 37th New York Infantry
- Conflicts: Blackburn's Ford; Siege of Yorktown; Battle of Williamsburg; Battle of Fair Oaks; Seven Days Battles; Battle of Oak Grove; Battle of Glendale; Battle of Malvern Hill; Battle of Groveton; Second Battle of Bull Run; Battle of Chantilly; Battle of Fredericksburg; Battle of Chancellorsville
- Awards: Medal of Honor

James Rowan O'Beirne (September 25, 1839 – February 17, 1917) was a lawyer, journalist, civil servant, and American soldier who fought with the U.S. Army in the American Civil War. O'Beirne received his country's highest award for bravery during combat, the Medal of Honor, for actions taken on June 1, 1862 during the Battle of Fair Oaks.

== Early life ==
He was born in Cappagh, County Roscommon, Ireland, to Michael Horan O'Beirne and Eliza Rowan O'Beirnehe was nine months-old he when his family emigrated to New York City. He grew up in Manhattan a devout Catholic and went to the Jesuit College of St. Francis Xavier then on 15th Street between 5th and 6th Avenues in Manhattan. He moved to the Bronx to complete his education at St. John's College (now Fordham University) as the valedictorian of the class of 1854. He continued on to study philosophy and then law at St. John's and received his Magister Artium (MA) and Legum Doctor (LL.D) in 1857. He briefly worked as an attorney in Manhattan until 1861.

== Military service ==
=== 1861 ===
When the Civil War broke out in April 1861, the self-described radical Republican originally enlisted as a private in Company I of the 7th New York Militia but was mustered out two months later. In July 1861 he reenlisted in Company C of the 37th New York Volunteer Infantry (Irish Rifles) and was given a commission as a 2nd lieutenant. The regiment continued in Hunter's Brigade, Division of the Potomac from August 4, 1861. Next they served in Richardson's Brigade from August 22, 1861; in same brigade, Heintzelman's Division, Army of the Potomac, from October 15, 1861.

O'Beirne left New York on June 23, 1861, with the regiment. The regiment initially served at and near Washington DC. They camped at the foot of East Capitol Street., Their regimental commander, John H McCune, (Note: John H. McCunn was born in Ulster, Ireland in 1820. He belonged to a poor Irish immigrant family who arrived in New York City in the 19th century. He worked as a dockhand before training as a lawyer, and eventually becoming a judge. When the war began he was appointed a Captain in the 69th New York Infantry Regiment before he recruited the 37th. As a reward for his recruiting, he was appointed its colonel. Despite his court-martial and relief, by war's end he was brevetted Brigadier General. After the war, he was a member of the infamous Tweed Ring, which he aided by naturalising new citizens to boost his election rolls. On one day alone, he naturalised over 2,000 new voters. However, when the scandal was uncovered, he was impeached and removed from office.) as the senior colonel was initially the brigade commander, but he was relieved for cause, court-martialed, and found guilty of conduct "prejudicial to the good order and military discipline" though also directed to "resume his sword and duties."

BGEN David Hunter was brought on to command the brigade as part of BGEN Samuel P. Heintzelman's Division, in BGEN McDowell's Army of Northeast Virginia.At the First Battle of Bull Run on July 21, 1861, O'Beirne and the regiment were in McDowell's reserves and suffered no casualties. During the battle O'Beirne had displayed leadership and a talent for soldiering such that he was promoted to 1st Lieutenant of Company C on August 9, 1861.

After the defeat at Bull Run, 1861, Lincoln relieved McDowell and appointed George B. McClellan as his new commander of the army at the capital. During the summer and fall, McClellan brought a high degree of organization to his new army, and greatly improved its morale with frequent trips to review and encourage his units. During this period of training and reorganization, O'Beirne and this 37th exchanged their smoothbore Model 1842 Muskets for newer rifle-muskets. They received Austrian Lorenz Rifled Muskets and P53 Enfield Rifled Muskets (slightly more Lorenz). In October, O'Beirne had a new brigade commander, BGEN Israel B. Richardson. The 37th remained in Heintzelman's Division, but were now part of the Army of the Potomac (AoP). They would remain in their division until March 1862.

Through this period O'Beirne continued to excel and as promoted to captain and took over command of Company C on November 4, 1861. At some point O'Beirne acquired a civilian rifle which he used instead of his pistol incombat. Among O'Beirne's duties of company commander were overseeing the color guard of the regiment as Company C's position was in the middle of the battle line. (Note: per O'Beirne in 1916: "I had two butchers and a color-sergeant in my company to which was entrusted the important custody of the colors,—a beautiful silk American Flag and an exquisitely embroidered green one with a glorious Sunburst and "Erin-fo-bragh" worked on it, presented by the Irish citizens of New York City. With them were a brace of expert foragers who could not be excelled. Our mess was well supplied through the aif of these favored sons of the Company with what the country afforded, as we advanced our lines." Officers in the U.S. Army at that time, like present-day U.S. Naval officers with their wardroom bills, had to purchase their own food, so these "scroungers" were quite appreciated by the Company Officers' Mess.) McClellan had rebuilt the forces into the Army of the Potomac, and O'Beirne and his men thought highly of him. At the end of November, O'Beirne and his regiment went into winter quarters in the defenses of Washington. (Note: McClellan had built defenses that were almost impregnable, consisting of 48 forts and strong points, with 480 guns manned by 7,200 artillerists. The Army of the Potomac grew in number from 50,000 in July to 168,000 in November, becoming the largest military force the United States had raised until that time.)

O'Beirne frequently saw friends in other regiments from the Irish community in New York. He frequently met some of his St. John's classmates as well as several of the Jesuits from the faculty who were serving as chaplains in the AoP. He also saw many colleagues from the legal profession in Manhattan. Among these were the fellow lawyers and St. John's classmates, the McMahon brothers, John Eugene (St. John's '48), James Power (St. John's '53), and the youngest, and fellow Medal of Honor winner, Martin Thomas (St. John's '55). O'Beirne was very close to the middle brother, James with whom he has numerous boxing bouts while undergraduates at Fordham. (Note: All three brothers were lawyers before the war in The two elder McMahon brothers had been born in Waterford before the family emigrated. The youngest had been born during a temporary residence in Quebec before they moved to New York City. John and James enlisted in the 164th New York Infantry Regiment where John was the colonel and James was the lieutenant colonel. John was wounded badly at Fredericksburg and was invalided to Buffalo, NY, where he died from complications of his wounds. O'Beirne's close friend, Jim, fleeted up to command the regiment and was killed in one of the frontal attacks at Cold Harbor on June 3, 1864.) As a product of the Jesuits, O'Beirne was also very close with Rev. Peter Tissot, S.J. who was the 37th's chaplain. (Note: This priest was born on October 15, 1823, in Savoy, France. After joining the Jesuits, he studied in Europe, before coming to the United States, and St. John's where he completed his studies earning JCD degree. After finishing, he took up a job at the University as a canon lawyerprocurator and occasionally taught. O'Beirne first met him as a teacher at St. John's. During his service with the 37th, Tissot kept a diary from 1861 to 1863 which was left to Fordham. He was known for providing inspiration, comfort and spiritual support to all even in the heat of combat. Following the war, Tissot returned to Fordham where he was president until in his last few years when he went on missionary work until his death on July 19, 1875, in Manhattan.)

=== 1862 ===
After several temporary assignments the regiment finally became a part of the 3d brigade, 3rd division, III Corps from March 13, 1862. (Note: The other regiments in the brigade were all from Michigan, the 2nd, the 3rd, and the 5th Michigan.) In March 1862, O'Beirne and the 37th the regiment embarked on steamers for Fortress Monroe. During the Peninsula Campaign, O'Beirne was active throughout the campaign. His first action was in the Siege of Yorktown (1862).

==== Peninsula Campaign ====
While at Williamsburg, he participated in the brigade's bayonet charge that drove the Rebels from the entrenchments. This action led to the regiment's receiving a complimentary mention from the division commander, BGEN Kearny for gallantry in action. During this battle 95 were killed, wounded, or found to be missing. (Note: In this battle, Hooker's Division had launched bayonet attacks to drive the Rebels from their entrenchments. Among this division was the Excelsior Brigade which contained the 70th, 72nd, 73rd, and 74th New York Infantry Regiments. These regiments were garbed in imported and New York-made chasseur uniforms, but some of these regiments had one or two companies of Zouaves. The entrenchments had changed hands several times when Kearny led the 37th and its brigade mates in an assault. O'Beirne wrote that the memory of the dead Zouaves (which he appears to misremember as members of the Duryée's Zouaves who were back in Yorktown as part of Sykes' infantry reserve) and Rebels impaled on each other's bayonets had haunted him for years.)

At the Battle of Fair Oaks and in the Seven Days' battles, the 37th was closely engaged. During the Seven Days at Oak Grove, leading Company C, O'Beirne performed the actions that would earn him the Medal of Honor. Holding the line with his company containing the regimental colors, he held the line and in turn kept the regiment held to their ground until ordered to fall back. (Note: The 37th was a well-drilled regiment and had been trained to load and fire their Lorenz and Enfield rifle-muskets from the prone position as to present a smaller target for their enemies. O'Beirne remained standing despite the urging of his men to lie down. He found himself the target of Rebel sharpshooters. He made a point of not standing still and firing his sporting rifle at any foes he saw aiming at him. The action was intense and O'Beirne later noted that he had fired 53 rounds from his rifle in the action.) These two battles were his regiment's third and fourth costliest battle with 81 casualties at Fair Oaks and 81 at Seven Days. After the battle, O'Beirne went with his regiment into at Harrison's Landing. (Note: Here, O'Beirne met some of his southern classmates from St. John's who were had been taken prisoner.)

After spending six weeks in camp with the rest of the AoP, O'Beirne and the 37th found themselves leaving the Peninsula suffering a strategic feat. On August 16, they moved to Alexandria and then pushed south to Centreville. O'Beirne and his regiment were present but in reserve at Second Bull Run and Chantilly during MGEN Pope's Northern Virginia campaign. The 37th detached from AoP during the Maryland campaign and went into the defenses at Washington.

==== Fredericksburg campaign ====
They remained in the capital's fortifications until October. O'Beirne and his regiment began gradual moves south in October and November. They joined the rest of the AoP, now commanded by Burnside reached Falmouth, across the Rappahannock from Fredericksburg on Saturday, December 6, 1862. O'Beirne and the regiment were active at Fredericksburg with a total loss of 35 members, and encamped near Falmouth during the rest of the winter.

=== 1863 ===
On Christmas Eve 1862, the regiment received the veterans of the 101st New York. On Tuesday, January 20, 1863, the 37th moved out in unseasonably mild weather on the AoP's infamous "Mud March". This offensive was Burnside's abortive second attempt at crossing the Rappahannock. Despite sound strategy, the offensive failed due to dissension among generals in the Army of the Potomac, compounded by severe winter storms. During the night of the 20th, the rain began, and by the morning of the 21st, the earth was soaked and the river banks had the appearance of a quagmire. For a considerable area around the planned crossing sites, men worked all day of January 21, but to little purpose. Thursday added even more to the storm, and the 37th and the rest of the AoP were swamped in the mud. As O'Beirne and his compatriots slogged through the mud, Lee had ample time to line the other shore with his army, although there was no attempt to interfere with his crossing except from the sharpshooters, who peppered away on all occasions. By Friday, the river was swollen. There seemed to be no end in sight of the bad weather. Burnside finally became resigned by the failure and gave the order for the army to return to its camp in Falmouth on Monday, January 26.

O'Beirne noted a brighter outlook for AoP when Hooker replaced Burnside as army commander. Under the new leadership preparations began for the Chancellorsville campaign. This upcoming campaign would incur the 37th's heaviest losses as well as personally costly for O'Beirne.. was suffered in the Chancellorsville campaign in May 1863, when 222 of the 37th were killed, wounded or missing.

A report from Major William DeLacy recounted the actions of this encounter in detail. The regiment struck tents the morning of April 28 and marched about 6 miles toward the Rappahannock River where they encamped. They crossed the river on May 1 at about 11 am. They defended a battery on the front and then connected with the left of General Howard's command. A night attack was undertaken at around 11 pm. DeLacey recounted how the regiment "Drove some troops from the rifle-pits on our right." On May 3, while the brigade was moving to the rear of the Union lines, a deadly attack on the front and left flank caused confusion and forced the regiment to fall back. The regiment was later reformed and fell back. After being wounded at the Battle of Chancellorsville, O'Beirne was mustered out. He was recommissioned as captain in the Veteran Reserve Corps in July.

=== Later war ===
O'Beirne was promoted to the rank of major in July 1864 and received brevet promotions to the ranks lieutenant colonel and colonel. In April 1865, he was serving as Provost Marshall of Washington DC and was active in the pursuit and capture of John Wilkes Booth and his associate conspirators following the assassination of US President Abraham Lincoln. In September 1865, he was brevetted to the rank of brigadier general for "gallant, distinguished and meritorious service" while serving in the Union Army during the Civil War and he was discharged from military duty on January 30, 1866. He then pursued a career in journalism, reporting for the Washington Sunday Gazette and the New York Herald. In the 1890s he served as second in command of immigration at Ellis Island, New York City. He died in New York City at the age of 77.

== Medal of Honor citation ==
The President of the United States of America, in the name of Congress, takes pleasure in presenting the Medal of Honor to Captain James Rowan O'Beirne, United States Army, for extraordinary heroism on May 31 & 1 June 1862, while serving with Company C, 37th New York Infantry, in action at Fair Oaks, Virginia. Captain O'Beirne gallantly maintained the line of battle until ordered to fall back.

== Personal life ==
While recovering from his wounds at Chancellorsville, he married Martha Susannah Brennan in New York. His daughter, Gertrude was born in 1865.

After the war, O'Beirne and his family remained in Washington where he received an appointment as Register of Wills in DC. His civil service career continued as Deputy United States Marshal and Acting Marshal during his superior's lengthy absences. He also worked as a journalist, serving as the editor and publisher of The Washington Gazette and as the Washington correspondent for the New York Times and New York Herald. He also traveled west several times with the U.S. Army as a war correspondent for the Herald during the Indian Wars of the 1870s. In Washington, he was active in the Grand Army of the Republic (GAR) and was well known among the political elites, receiving a bust of Simón Bolívar from the Venezuelan government upon his departure from Washington.

In March 1889, fellow veteran and GAR member, President Benjamin Harrison appointed him Assistant Commissioner of Immigration at Ellis Island. He and his family returned home with the appointment. During his tenure, he frequently ran the facility when the Commissioner was in Europe. He remained in that post for the duration of the Harrison administration.

During the twenty-year project of publishing The War of the Rebellion: a Compilation of the Official Records of the Union and Confederate Armies, the federal government began reviewing the actions of veterans to recognize those that had performed actions worthy of the Medal of Honor. O'Beirne's conduct during the Battle of Seven Pines between May 31, 1862 – June 1, 1862, was deemed deserving of the award. He received his medal in January 1891.

He was active in veterans' affairs; he served a term as the Grand Marshal of the GAR Posts of New York state. He was an active donor and fund-raiser for the Irish Parliament Fund Association and United Irish League, as well as several Irish benevolent associations. His wife died in June 1895.

In 1897, he was appointed to a six-year term as Commissioner of Charities in New York City. He continued with his involvement in charitable works after his term expired in 1901. As well as his devotion to veterans and Irish causes, he was very active in his church. He was involved in the New York Archdiocese and very closely involved in supporting the Jesuits at his alma maters, St. Francis Xavier and St. John's. He remained close with his surviving classmates and former teachers. He was a strong supporter of St. John's cadet corps (the precursor of the modern ROTC unit at Fordham). Although never a trustee of the college, he was also involved in the opening of the law and medical schools and when St. John's College officially became Fordham University on March 7, 1907. He contributed articles to the alumni magazine and was a common sight on the Bronx campus until shortly before his death in Manhattan at the age of 77, on February 17, 1917.

== Detailed Service ==
O'Beirne, James Rowan

- -Age: 24 years
- -Enrolled: April 17, 1861, at New York city to serve one month; mustered in as Private, Company I, 7th Militia, April 26, 1861; mustered out with company, June 3, 1861, at New York city
- -Enrolled: July 7, 1861, at Washington to serve two years, and mustered in as Private, Company C, 37th New York Infantry Regiment
- -Dates of Rank: 2LT, July 9, 1861, 1LT, August 9, 1861, CPT, November 4, 1861
- -Wounded in action, May 3, 1863, at Chancellorsville, VA
- -Mustered out with company, June 22, 1863, at New York city; subsequent service in Veteran Reserve Corps as Provost in Washington, DC
- -Medal of Honor
- -Billets: Commissioned 2LT, in Company C, 37th New York Infantry, August 9, 1861, with rank from July 9, 1861, replacing Joshua V. Willitt who was discharged; 1LT, Company C second-in-command, 37th New York Infantry, August 27, 1861, with rank from August 9, 1861, replacing 1LT Martin E. Lawlor who was discharged; CPT, Company C commander, 37th New York Infantry, December 2, 1861, with rank from November 4, 1861, replacing CPT Michael Doran who was dismissed.

== See also ==
- List of American Civil War brevet generals (Union)
