= Leuty =

Leuty is an English surname. Notable people with the surname include:

- David Leuty (born 1960), Canadian bobsledder
- Leon Leuty (1920–1955), English footballer
- Thomas Leuty (1853–1911), British politician

== See also ==
- Luty
