= John Burke (colonel) =

John Timothy Burke
- Born: July 8, 1838; Dunmanway, County Cork, Ireland
- Died: June 23, 1914 (aged 75); Oswego, New York, U.S.
- Burial place: Oswego, New York, U.S.
- Military career
- Allegiance: United States (Union)
- Branch: Union Army
- Service years: 1861–1862
- Rank: Colonel
- Unit: 37th New York Volunteer Infantry Regiment
- Commands: 63rd New York Volunteer Infantry Regiment
- Conflicts: Peninsula Campaign; Battle of Oak Grove; Maryland Campaign; Battle of Antietam
- Awards: None

John Timothy Burke (July 8, 1838 – June 23, 1914) was an Irish American officer in the Union Army during the American Civil War. He was court martialed for alleged cowardice at the Battle of Antietam and dismissed from the army.

Burke was born in Dunmanway, County Cork, Ireland. He emigrated to the United States and settled in Oswego, New York. At the start of the war, Burke was the lieutenant colonel of the 37th New York Volunteer Infantry Regiment "The Irish Rifles". During the Peninsula Campaign, he was wounded in the first of the Seven Days Battles on June 25, 1862, at Oak Grove.

By the Maryland Campaign in September 1862, he had become the colonel of the 63rd New York Volunteer Infantry Regiment in "The Irish Brigade". During the fighting around the Sunken Road at Antietam General Thomas F. Meagher, commander of the Irish Brigade, was wounded. Colonel Burke assumed command of the brigade and led it from September 17–18 when General Meagher returned to command.

Burke died in Oswego at the age of 75 and was buried in the town's cemetery.
