= Conboy =

== People ==
- Frederick J. Conboy (1883–1949), Canadian politician
- Tim Conboy (born 1982), American hockey player
- Kevin Conboy (born 1987), Danish football player
- Martin Thomas Conboy Jr. (1878–1944), American attorney, including U.S. Attorney for the Southern District of New York

== Places ==
- Conboy Lake National Wildlife Refuge at Mount Adams
