= 37th New York Infantry Regiment =

- Active: June 6, 1861, to June 22, 1863
- Country: United States
- Allegiance: Union
- Branch: Infantry
- Size: 939, (Note: As reported back to Adjutant General Hillhouse upon departure from New York on June 27, 1861) 740 (Note: As reported back to Adjutant General Hillhouse, on December 31, 1862), 772 (Note: As reported back to Adjutant General Sprague, on December 31, 1863)
- Nickname: Irish Rifles
- Equipment: Model 1842 Springfield Muskets (.58 caliber, rifled) (Note: On 18 Sep 1861, 846 Harper's Ferry rifled Model 1842s, percussion locks from manufacture and rifled. As reported back to Adjutant General on December 31, 1863. This was the number turned in when issued Enfields and Lorenz.), Enfield Rifled Muskets, Austrian Rifled Muskets
- Engagements: Blackburn's Ford; Siege of Yorktown; Battle of Williamsburg; Battle of Fair Oaks; Seven Days Battles; Battle of Oak Grove; Battle of Glendale; Battle of Malvern Hill; Battle of Groveton; Second Battle of Bull Run; Battle of Chantilly; Battle of Fredericksburg; Battle of Chancellorsville

Commanders
- Colonel: John H. McCunn
- Colonel: Samuel B. Hayman

Insignia
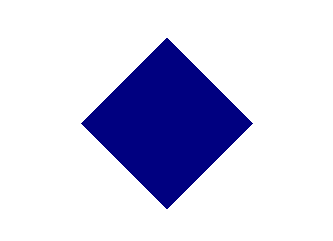
- III Corps (3rd Division) badge

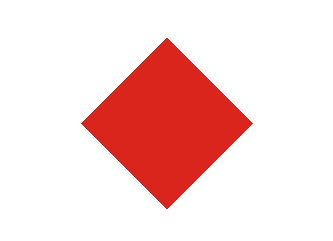
- III Corps (1st Division) badge

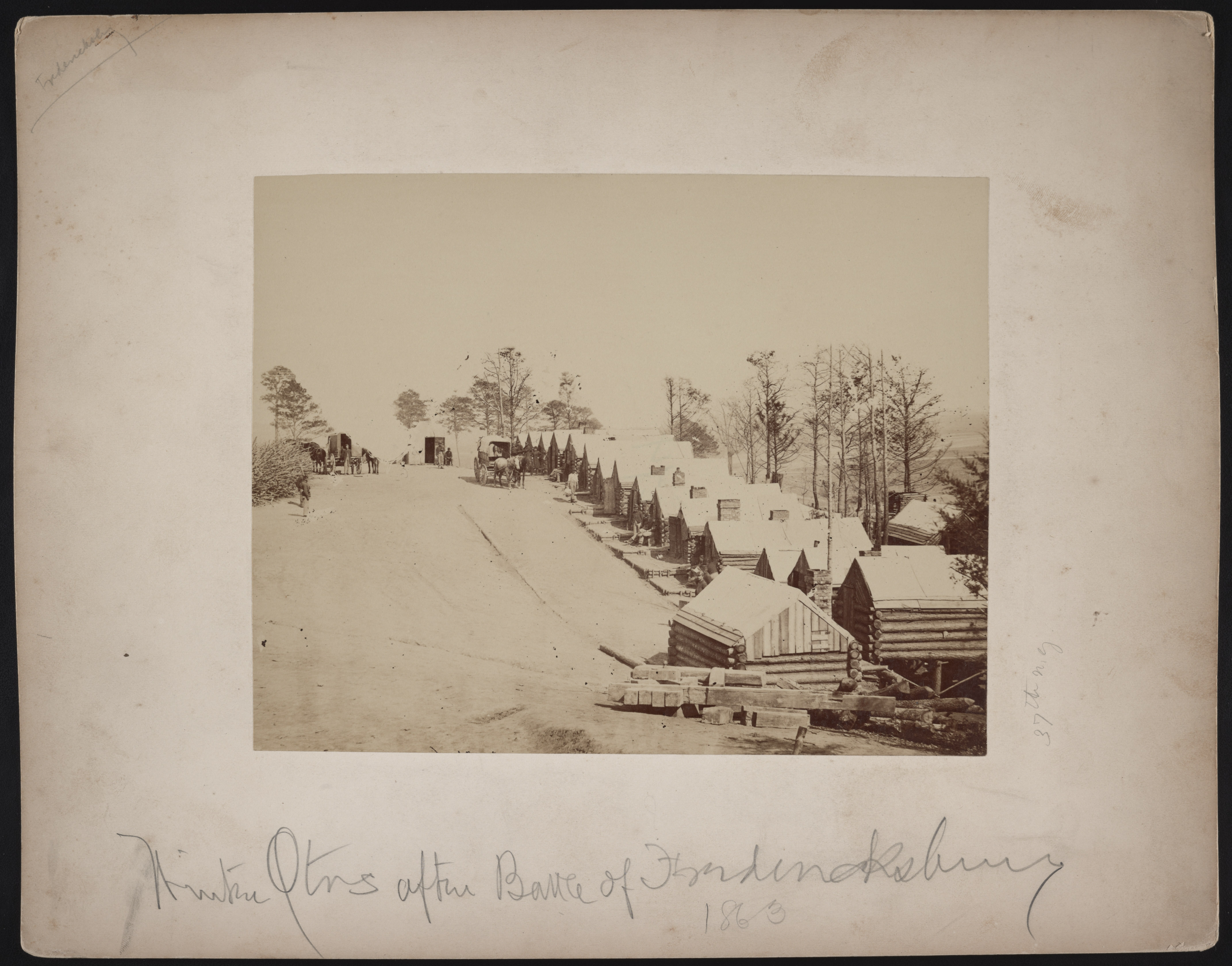
Winter quarters of 37th New York Infantry Regiment after the Battle of Fredericksburg. From the Liljenquist Family Collection of Civil War Photographs, Prints and Photographs Division, Library of Congress

The 37th New York Infantry Regiment or the Irish Rifles was formed accepted by the State on May 25, 1861, and organized in New York City. The regiment mustered in the service of the United States on June 6 and 7, 1861 for two years of service to June 22, 1863.

The 75th New York Militia formed the nucleus of the regiment. Several companies were recruited: H at Allegany, I at Ellicottsville, K at Pulaski, and all others at New York City. Men from the 101st New York Volunteer Infantry joined this regiment by transfer on December 24, 1862. An on May 25, 1863, men who had served were consolidated into two companies and these were transferred to the 40th Infantry as Companies I and K.

== Service ==
The 37th New York had its roots in the 75th New York State Militia, organized in 1856 by John H. McCunn, colonel; James Haggerty, lieutenant colonel; and Dennis C. Minton, major. The 75th was disbanded in 1856, but was revived in April 1861 when President Abraham Lincoln issued his call to arms.

=== 1861 ===
After leaving the State of New York on June 23, 1861, the regiment served at and near Washington D.C. until March 1862. They camped at the foot of East Capitol Street. An incident between Colonel John H. McCunn and 1st Lieutenant Robert F. Hunter who was then serving with the provost guard. McCunn was found guilty of conduct "prejudicial to the good order and military discipline" though also directed to "resume his sword and duties. Their service continued in COL John H. McCunn's Brigade in the Army of Northeastern Virginia from July 21, 1861.

The regiment continued in Hunter's Brigade, Division of the Potomac from August 4, 1861. Next they served in Richardson's Brigade from August 22, 1861; in same brigade, Heintzelman's Division, Army of the Potomac, from October 15, 1861. The regiment participated in the First Battle of Bull Run in MGEN McDowell's reserves and went into winter quarters near Bailey's cross-roads.

=== 1862 ===
After several temporary assignments the regiment finally became a part of the 3d brigade, 1st division, III Corps in McClellan's Army of the Potomac (AoP) on March 13, 1862.

==== The Peninsula campaign ====
Companies H and I had served detached from the regiment at Fort Washington, D. C., from August, 1861, to March, 1862, and rejoined the regiment in Alexandria on March 15. The regiment embarked for Fortress Monroe on Saturday, March 17, 1862. Morale was high in the army as they looked forward to the campaign, and some of the men in the 37th had smuggled whiskey aboard the transports leading to a drunken brawl with men of the 2nd Michigan that ended when the 2nd's colonel Orlando Poe, roughly sent five of the 37th's instigators below decks.The 37th was part of a movement of 121,500 men that an English observer remarked that it was the "stride of a giant." Amassing his army at Ft. Monroe, McClellan shelved his initial amphibious envelopment of Yorktown because the CSS Virginia was still in operation, and he ordered an advance up the Peninsula to begin April 4.

On April 5, the IV Corps made initial contact with Confederate defensive works at Lee's Mill, an area McClellan expected to move through without resistance. This unexpected defensive line stretched across the peninsula along the Warwick River. Taken in by a successful Rebel deception campaign by the local Rebel commander, MGEN John B. Magruder, McClellan began his siege. The 37th found themselves in the lines directly opposite Yorktown as a member of Heintzelman's III Corps. After a failed attempt to disrupt the Confederates' improvement of their fortifications at Dam No. 1, on the Warwick River near Lee's Mill, on Wednesday, April 16, the AoP spent the remainder of April in the laborious process of transporting and placing massive siege artillery batteries, which McClellan planned to deploy on May 5. By this time, LTGEN Joseph E. Johnston and his Army of Northern Virginia were in the Yorktown fortifications. The men of the 37th had to endure frequent April rains that turned the opposing trenches to morasses of mud. Among the more dangerous duty during the siege was picket duty in advance of the main lines, rotated through the companies along the 37th's frontage.

Escaped slaves entering the 37th's corps' lines on Saturday, May 3, reported that the Rebels were sending their supply wagons in the direction of Richmond. McClellan refused to believe the intelligence because of his overestimation of the size of Rebel forces opposite him. He was convinced that Johnston's 120,000 man army (Note: This was a problem that the cautious McClellan would leave as a legacy to the AoP, a worry, caution, and overestimation of the enemy, that would not cease until Grant took over in 1864.) would stay and fight. Saturday evening, the 37th and the other troops received a brief bombardment from the Rebel fortifications. Early Sunday morning, the 37th's corps commander, Heintzelman, ascended in one of Lowe's observation balloons and saw that the Yorktown defenses were empty. (Note: "Professor" Thaddeus S. C. Lowe, a New Hampshire Yankee native headed the AoP's Aeronaut Corps. He had been active providing reports to McClellan, weather permitting since April 6. His two hydrogen balloons, Intrepid and Constitution, were kept at a distance by some of the first instances of anti-aircraft fire to provide enough reliable actionable intelligence to McClellan. The Rebels countered with a hot-air balloon, but its endurance was limited as the air cooled without a portable heat source. Heintzelman rode in the Intrepid with Lowe on that Sunday morning, noting in his diary, "We could not see a gun on the rebel works or a man. Their tents were standing & all quiet as the grave.")

A surprised McClellan sent cavalry after Johnston who decided to make a stand Fort Magruder, straddling the Williamsburg Road (from Yorktown), constructed earlier by Magruder. (Note: This was the narrowest part of the peninsula, only seven miles in width reduced to three by the river marshes and tributary creeks funneling any large movement of troops to the area just in front of the fort.) The Battle of Williamsburg was the first pitched battle of the Peninsula campaign, in which nearly 41,000 Union and 32,000 Confederates were engaged. BGEN Joseph Hooker's division, first in line of march, made first contact. It assaulted Ft Magruder, but by 15:00, was being driven back and was at the point of being overrun by MGEN James Longstreet when they were saved by the timely arrival of BGEN Philip Kearny's (Note: Possibly the most combat-experienced officer in AoP, he was the nephew of Stephen W. Kearny. A Columbia Law School graduate had received a direct commission in 1836 in the cavalry after receiving a sizeable inheritance from his grandfather, Kearny had studied at the famous French cavalry school in Saumur in 1839, fought in North Africa with the Chasseurs d'Afrique in 1840, fought in the Mexican War in 1846-1847, fought against the Rogue River Indians in Oregon 1851, and rejoined the Chasseurs d'Afrique to fight against Austrian forces in Italy in 1859. He rode with Napoleon III's Imperial Guard at the Battle of Solferino on June 24, 1859, the largest since the Battle of Leipzig in 1813 (It was also the last major battle in world history where all the armies were under the personal command of their monarchs.) At Solferino, he charged with the cavalry under général Louis-Michel Morris, which penetrated the Austrian center and captured the key point of the battle. For this action, Kearny was awarded the French Légion d'honneur, becoming the first U.S. citizen to be thus honored.) 3rd Division. Kearny immediately deployed his men to Hooker's left. The 37th, being in BGEN Berry's 3rd brigade in Kearny's division, deployed on the left flank of their division with the regimental flank anchored against the marshy ground sloping down to Halfway Creek.

The battle was heavy and fought where the gun smoke combined with rain and fog to hamper visibility. There were several Rebel attempts to turn AoP's left flank. Berry had formed the 37th in loose order to extend through the woods between the farmland and the marsh. COL Hayman had further refused his line with Company B lest any rebels got through the timber and marsh. In that position, the 37th was continually engaged. Initially, the line was taken under fire from Confederate troops in the woods to their front. Soon, scouts came back from the woods reporting Rebels moving through the woods and marsh to get around the flank. Hayman shifted Companies C. F, G, I, K and to extend Company B's refusal of the line so that when the enemy came into the open they would not be behind the regiment. The 37th quickly repulsed the Rebels first and many frequent subsequent attempts to turn the left flank. After several of these assaults, the Rebels withdrew. The four companies remaining in the original line, Companies A, D, E, and H, had spread out further, but were also successful in beating back the attacks. Overall, holding down the left flank allowed Berry, and in turn, Kearny to keep the line intact and, in turn, allowed Hooker to hold. A Confederate assault on the other end of the line against Hancock's brigade in the 2nd Division of IV Corps failed with great loss and the battle ended. Around 17:00, McClellan finally arrived on the field from his headquarters in Yorktown despite being aware of heavy fighting since 09:00.

While at Williamsburg they received a complimentary mention from General Philip Kearny for gallantry in action. (Note: Kearny noted that the 37th was "on the extreme left, was charged with guarding against the enemy turning our flank. This duty required vigilance and pertinacity.") Several of the company-grade officers and staff NCOs were commended by both Berry and Hayman for their performance during this action. While Hooker's division was mauled, the 37th and Kearny's division as well as Hancock's brigade at the other end of the U.S. line, acquitted themselves well. During this battle, the 37th suffered 95 killed, wounded, or found to be missing.

While McClellan reported this battle as a brilliant victory saved from defeat by his appearance on the field, it was actually a planned delaying action by Johnston who bought time for his retreating army to get back to the defenses at Richmond. McClellan, per usual, was inept when the enemy behaved differently from how he expected, and he downplayed the performance of his subordinates while puffing up his ineffective actions. Francis Palfrey, (Note: Palfrey (1831–1889) was an American historian and Civil War officer. A Harvard graduate (BA '51 and JLD '53), he was a first lieutenant in the 4th Battalion of the Massachusetts Militia before the war. At the start of the war, he was made a lieutenant colonel in the 20th Massachusetts, or the "Harvard Regiment." He would serve under William Raymond Lee, and alongside Henry Livermore Abbott, Oliver Wendell Holmes Jr., and Paul Joseph Revere. He was severely wounded at the Battle of Antietam. Following Lee's discharge in December 1862, Palfrey fleeted up to Colonel and command of the regiment, a post he held until his own medical discharge in April 1863. He became a historian and wrote many histories (see his Wikipedia article) This analysis of McClellan has been quoted by numerous historians since the 19th century.) an oft-quoted officer in the 20th Massachusetts, concluded that the commanding general's late arrival at the battle marked a pattern of behavior, a reluctance to actually command in battle; he wrote, "Curiously enough, there was almost always something for McClellan to do more important than to fight his own battles."

At the Battle of Fair Oaks and in the Seven Days' battles the regiment was closely engaged, after which it went into camp at Harrison's landing; moved from there to Alexandria; was present at the battles of Bull Run and Chantilly; reached Falmouth December 6, 1862; was active at Fredericksburg with a total loss of 35 members; and encamped near Falmouth during the rest of the winter.

On December 24, 1862, the regiment received the veterans of the 101st N. Y.

=== 1863 ===
The heaviest loss was suffered in the Chancellorsville campaign in May, 1863, when 222 of the 37th were killed, wounded or missing. A report from Major William DeLacy recounted the actions of this encounter in detail. The regiment struck tents the morning of April 28 and marched about 6 miles toward the Rappahannock River where they encamped. They crossed the river on May 1 at about 11am. They defended a battery on the front and then to connect with the left of General Howard's command. A night attack was undertaken at around 11pm. DeLacey recounted how the regiment "Drove some troops from the rifle-pits on our right." On May 3 while the brigade was moving to the rear of the Union lines, a deadly attack on the front and left flank caused confusion and forced the regiment to fall back. The regiment was later reformed and fell back.

The three years men were transferred to the 40th N. Y. on May 29, 1863. On June 22, 1863, the regiment was mustered out at New York City under the command of COL S. B. Hayman.

== Affiliations, battle honors, detailed service, and casualties ==
=== Organizational affiliation ===
Attached to:

- BGEN Hunter's Brigade, BGEN Heintzelman's Division, BGEN McDowell's Army of Northeast Virginia, to August to October, 1861
- BGEN Richardson's Brigade, BGEN Heintzelman's Division, Army of the Potomac (AoP), to March, 1862.
- 2nd Brigade, 3rd Division, III Corps, AoP, to July, 1862.
- 3rd Brigade, 3rd Division, III Corps, to July, 1862.
- 3rd Brigade, 1st Division, III Corps, to June, 1863.

=== List of battles ===
The official list of battles in which the regiment bore a part:

- Blackburn's Ford
- Siege of Yorktown
- Battle of Williamsburg
- Battle of Fair Oaks
- Seven Days Battles
- Battle of Oak Grove
- Battle of Glendale
- Battle of Malvern Hill
- Battle of Groveton (Note: The NPS has established these dates for the battle. The references by Greene, Hennessy, Salmon, and Kennedy, whose works are closely aligned with the NPS, adopt these dates as well. However, all of the other references to this article specify that the action on August 28 was a prelude to, but separate from, the Second Battle of Bull Run. Some of these authors name the action on August 28 the Battle of Groveton or Brawner's Farm.)
- Second Battle of Bull Run
- Battle of Chantilly
- Battle of Fredericksburg
- Battle of Chancellorsville

=== Detailed service ===
==== 1861 ====
- Left New York for Washington, D.C., June 19, 1861.
- Duty in the Defences of Washington, DC till March, 1862. (Cos. "H" and "I" detached as

garrison at Fort Washington August, 1861, to March, 1862.)

- Reconnaissance to Pohick Church and Occoquan October 18, 1861, and November 11, 1861

==== 1862 ====
- Lee's House, Occoquan Bridge, January 29, 1862.
- Mason's Creek February 24.
- Moved to the Peninsula, VA., March 17.
- Siege of Yorktown April 5-May 4.
- Battle of Williamsburg May 5.
- Battle of Seven Pines or Fair Oaks May 31-June 1.
- Seven days before Richmond June 25-July 1.
- Oak Grove near Seven Pines June 25.
- Charles City Cross Roads and Glendale June 30.
- Malvern Hill July 1.
- At Harrison's Landing till August 16.
- Moved to Fortress Monroe, thence to Centreville August 16–27.
- Pope's Campaign in Northern Virginia August 28-September 2.
- Battles of Groveton August 29
- Second Bull Run August 30
- Chantilly September 1.
- Duty in the Defences of Washington till October.
- Movement to Falmouth October and November.
- Battle of Fredericksburg, VA., December 12–15

==== 1863 ====
- "Mud March" January 20–24, 1863.
- At Falmouth till April.
- Chancellorsville Campaign April 27-May 6.
- Operations at Franklin's Crossing April 29-May 1.
- Battle of Chancellorsville May 1–5.
- Mustered out June 22, 1863, expiration of term. Three years men transferred to 40th Regiment New York Infantry.

== Casualties ==
Regiment lost during service 5 Officers and 69 Enlisted men killed and mortally wounded and 1 Officer and 37 Enlisted men by disease. Total 112. The regiment's bloodiest battles were Williamsburg, Seven Days, Fredericksburg, and Chancellorsville.

== Armament ==
Soldiers in the 37th were armed with 803 Model 1842 Muskets. By the end of the first full year of hard campaigning, the regimented returned 720 Model 1842 smoothbore percussion muskets to the Adjutant General. At some point in the fall of 1861, the regiment, like others in its division, exchanged the smoothbore muskets for newer rifled muskets at the Washington DC arsenal. By the end of the first full year of hard campaigning, the regiment reported the following survey result to U.S. War Department:

- A — 15 P53 Enfield Rifled Muskets. (Note: When the American arms company, Robbins & Lawrence’s went bankrupt after the Crimean War ended, the New York firm of Fox, Henderson & Company, a creditor, agreed to accept 5,600 Pattern 1853 guns to be assembled by Vermont Arms as payment for their credit interest in the now bankrupt company. In 1858 Vermont Arms also failed, and the remaining inventory and assets were sold at auction. The State of New York purchased the completed arms and stored them in their armories. New York merchants like Fox, Henderson & Company also sold many of the completed arms (as well as imported Enfields built by license in Liege, Belgium) to southern states during 1860 and early 1861. The states had purchased the arms in preparation for the Civil War that they were sure was about to happen. Finally waking up to the arms purchases going on under their noses, in New York, on January 21, 1861, the NYPD intercepted and impounded 38 cases of rifled muskets that were being headed to Alabama and Georgia. The Enfields in New York's inventory were mostly American-made like the Windsors and license-built in Liege, Belgium.) (.58 and .577 Cal.); 55 Austrian Lorenz Rifled Muskets, leaf and block sights, Quadrangular bayonet (.54 Cal) (Note: The Lorenz rifle was the third most widely used rifle during the American Civil War. The Union recorded purchases of 226,924. Its quality was inconsistent. Some were considered to be of the finest quality (particularly ones from the Vienna Arsenal), and were sometimes praised as being superior to the Enfield; others, especially those in later purchases from private contractors, were described as horrible in both design and condition. Lorenz rifles in the Civil War were generally used with .54 caliber cartridges designed for the Model 1841 "Mississippi" rifle. These differed from the cartridges manufactured in Austria and may have contributed to the unreliability of the weapons. Many of the rifles were bored out to .58 caliber to accommodate standard Springfield rifle ammunition.)
- B — 67 Austrian Lorenz Rifled Muskets, leaf and block sights, Quadrangular bayonet (.54 and .55 Cal)
- C — 63 Austrian Lorenz Rifled Muskets, leaf and block sights, Quadrangular bayonet (.54 and .55 Cal)
- D — 24 P53 Enfield Rifled Muskets (.58 and .577 Cal.); 37 Austrian Lorenz Rifled Muskets, leaf and block sights, Quadrangular bayonet (.54 and .55 Cal)
- E — 21 P53 Enfield Rifled Muskets (.58 and .577 Cal.); 41 Austrian Lorenz Rifled Muskets, leaf and block sights, Quadrangular bayonet (.54 and .55 Cal)
- F — 24 P53 Enfield Rifled Muskets (.58 and .577 Cal.); 35 Austrian Lorenz Rifled Muskets, leaf and block sights, Quadrangular bayonet (.54 and .55 Cal)
- G — 20 P53 Enfield Rifled Muskets (.58 and .577 Cal.); 46 Austrian Lorenz Rifled Muskets, leaf and block sights, Quadrangular bayonet (.54 and .55 Cal)
- H — 49 Springfield Rifled Muskets, model 1855, 1861, National Armory (NA) (Note: In government records, National Armory refers to one of three United States Armory and Arsenals, the Springfield Armory, the Harpers Ferry Armory, and the Rock Island Arsenal. Rifle-muskets, muskets, and rifles were manufactured in Springfield and Harper's Ferry before the war. When the Rebels destroyed the Harpers Ferry Armory early in the American Civil War and stole the machinery for the Confederate central government-run Richmond Armory, the Springfield Armory was briefly the only government manufacturer of arms, until the Rock Island Arsenal was established in 1862. During this time production ramped up to unprecedented levels ever seen in American manufacturing up until that time, with only 9,601 rifles manufactured in 1860, rising to a peak of 276,200 by 1864. These advancements would not only give the Union a decisive technological advantage over the Confederacy during the war but served as a precursor to the mass production manufacturing that contributed to the post-war Second Industrial Revolution and 20th century machine manufacturing capabilities. American historian Merritt Roe Smith has drawn comparisons between the early assembly machining of the Springfield rifles and the later production of the Ford Model T, with the latter having considerably more parts, but producing a similar numbers of units in the earliest years of the 1913–1915 automobile assembly line, indirectly due to mass production manufacturing advancements pioneered by the armory 50 years earlier.) and contract, (.58 Cal.); 18 P53 Enfield Rifled Muskets (.58 and .577 Cal.)
- I — 35 Springfield Rifled Muskets, model 1855, 1861, NA and contract, (.58 Cal.); 22 Enfield Rifled Muskets. Caliber .58 and .577
- K — 24 P53 Enfield Rifled Muskets (.58 and .577 Cal.); 38 Austrian Lorenz Rifled Muskets, leaf and block sights, Quadrangular bayonet (.54 and .55 Cal)

Three months later, after an effort to get most of the companies to be armed with the same weapon to make supply easier, the regiment reported the following survey:

- A — 68 Austrian Lorenz Rifled Muskets, leaf and block sights, Quadrangular bayonet (.54 and .55 Cal)
- B — 81 Austrian Lorenz Rifled Muskets, leaf and block sights, Quadrangular bayonet (.54 and .55 Cal)
- C — 64 Austrian Lorenz Rifled Muskets, leaf and block sights, Quadrangular bayonet (.54 and .55 Cal)
- D — 65 Austrian Lorenz Rifled Muskets, leaf and block sights, Quadrangular bayonet (.54 and .55 Cal)
- E — 62 Austrian Lorenz Rifled Muskets, leaf and block sights, Quadrangular bayonet (.54 and .55 Cal)
- F — 1 P53 Enfield Rifled Muskets (.58 and .577 Cal.); 62 Austrian Rifled Muskets, quadrangular bayonet. Caliber .54 and .55
- G — 61 Austrian Rifled Muskets, quadrangular bayonet. Caliber .54 and .55
- H — 48 Springfield Rifled Muskets, model 1855, 1861, NA and contract, (.58 Cal.); 9 P53 Enfield Rifled Muskets (.58 and .577 Cal.); 2 Austrian Lorenz Rifled Muskets, leaf and block sights, Quadrangular bayonet (.54 and .55 Cal)
- I — 35 Springfield Rifled Muskets, model 1855, 1861, NA and contract, (.58 Cal.); 25 P53 Enfield Rifled Muskets (.58 and .577 Cal.)
- K — 4 P53 Enfield Rifled Muskets (.58 and .577 Cal.); 62 Austrian Lorenz Rifled Muskets, leaf and block sights, Quadrangular bayonet (.54 and .55 Cal)

=== Rifle-muskets ===
Issued weapons

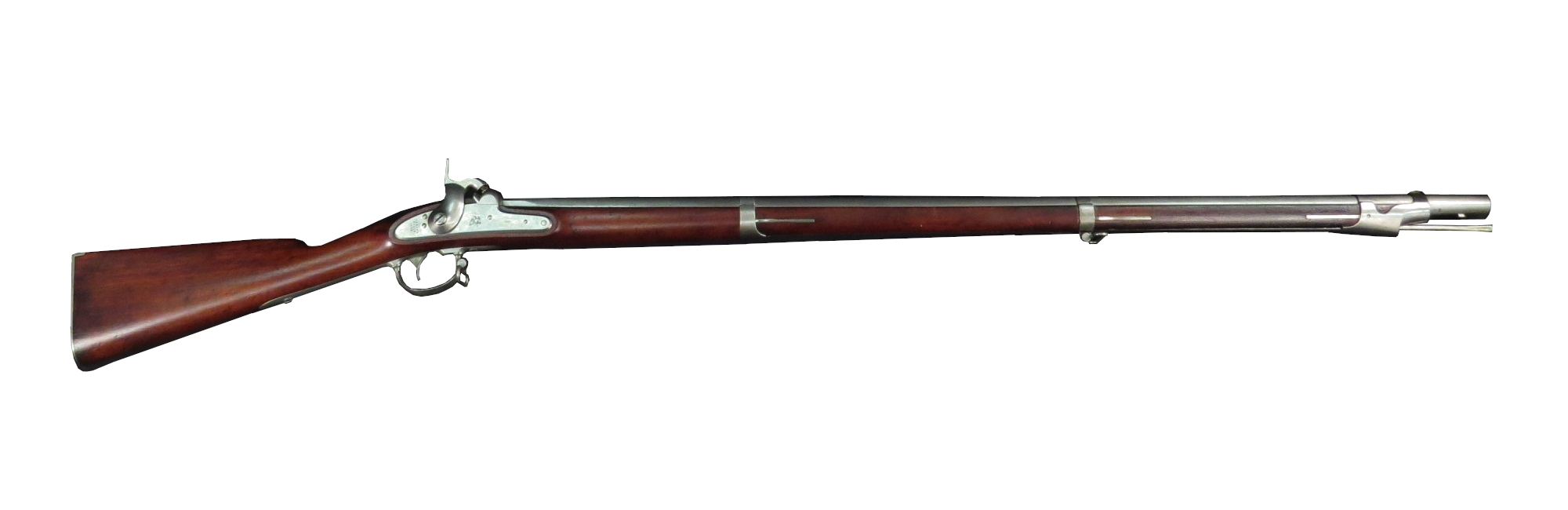
Model 1842 smoothbore musket

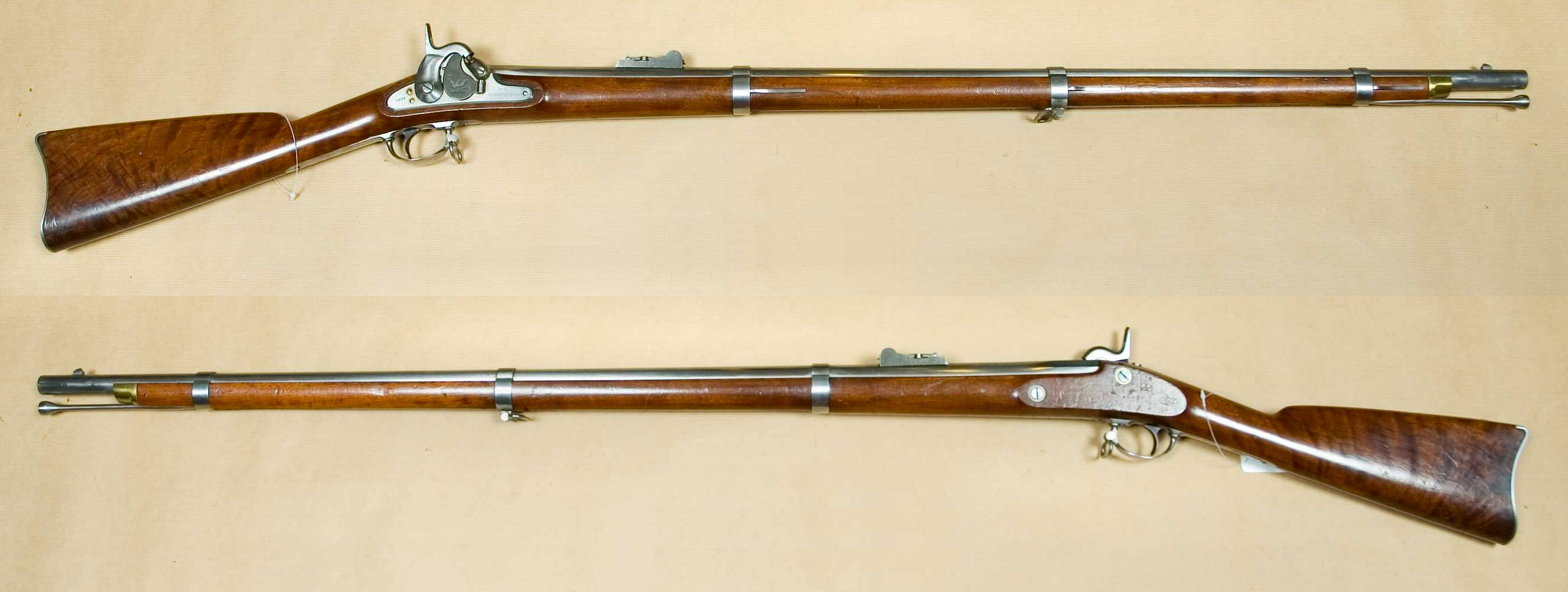
Springfield Model 1855

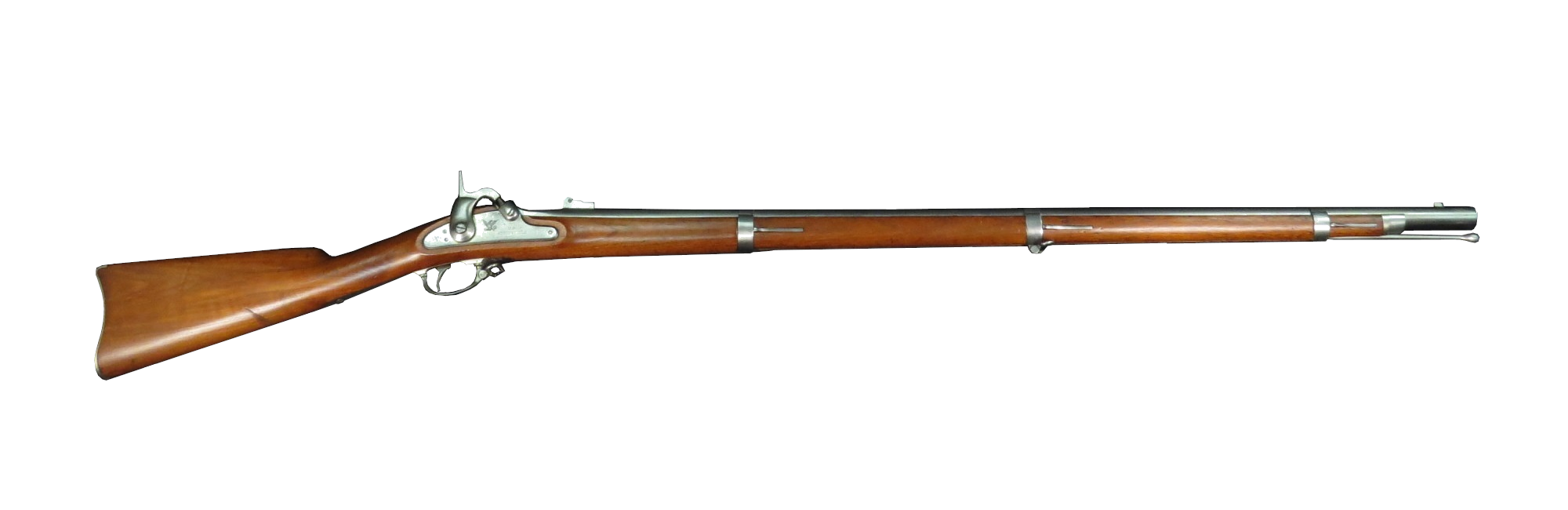
Springfield Model 1861

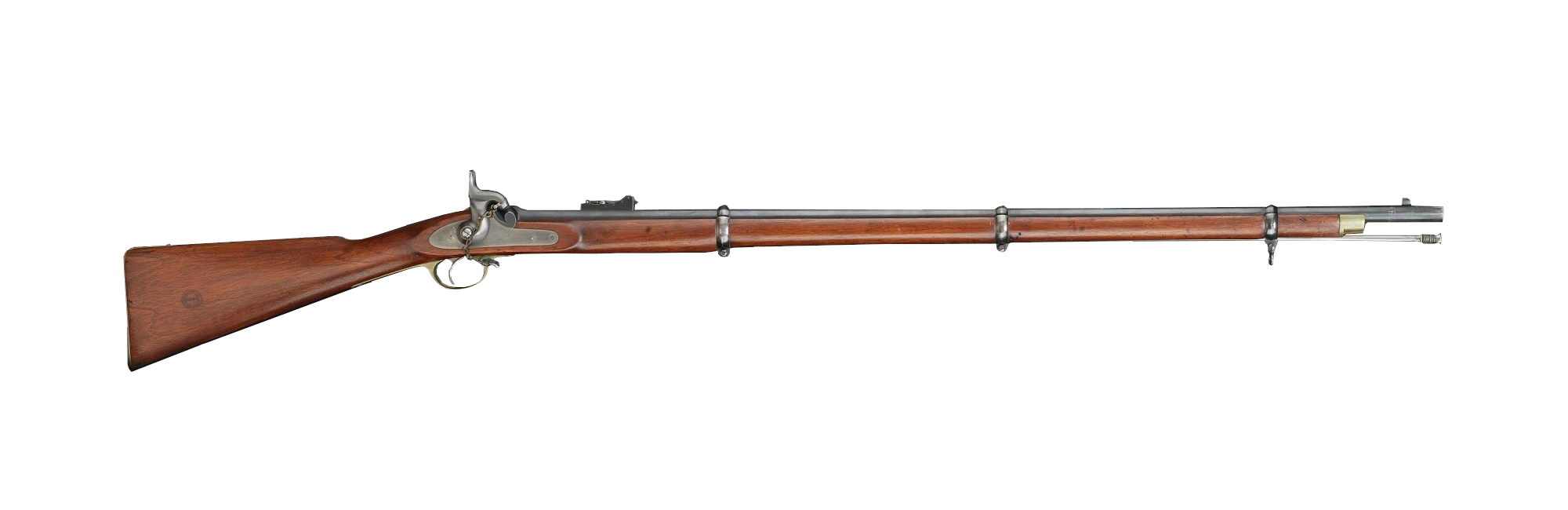
Pattern 1853 Enfield rifle-musket

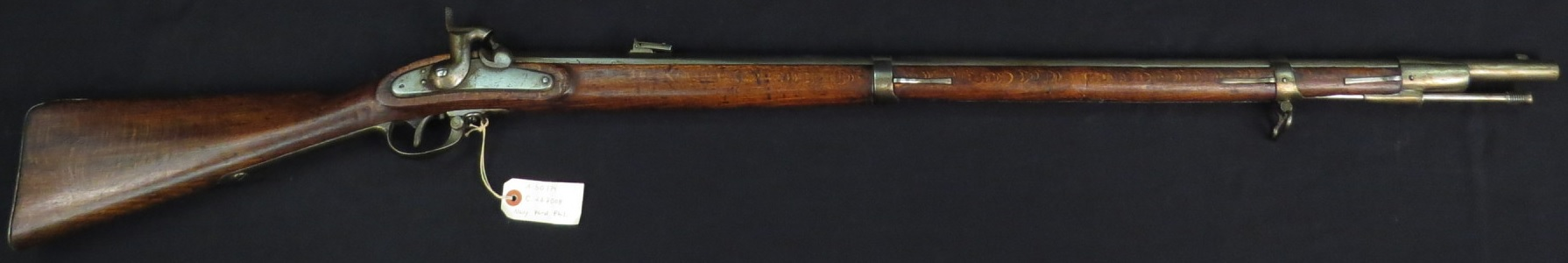
Lorenz Rifle Model 1854

== Uniform ==
The men of the regiment were initially issued the nine-button fatigue jackets dark blue sack coats, sky blue trousers or pantaloons with dark blue stripe on the outseams, and the sky blue infantry winter overcoat.

== Commanders ==
- COL John H. McCunn - June 8 to August 31, 1861
- COL Samuel B. Hayman - September 28, 1861, to June 22, 1863.

== Regimental staff ==
- LTC John Burke, from May 28, 1861, to February 6, 1862.
- LTC Gilbert Riordan, from January 21, 1862, to June 22, 1863.
- MAJ Dennis C. Minton, from June 7, 1861, to September 4, 1861.
- MAJ Gilbert Riordan, from September 4, 1861, to January 21, 1862.
- MAJ Patrick Henry Jones, from January 21, 1862, to October 8, 1862.
- MAJ William DeLacy, from October 8, 1862, to June 22, 1863.
- CPT John Torboss Underhill
- Adjutant Cornelius Murphy, from June 7, 1861, to November 4, 1861.
- Adjutant Patrick H. Jones, from November 8, 1861, to January 21, 1862.
- Adjutant James Henry, from January 21, 1862, to June 22, 1863.
- Quartermaster Charles H. Hoyt, from June 8, 1861, to June 8, 1862.
- Quartermaster John Phalon, from April 23, 1862, to June 22, 1863.
- Surgeon John McNulty, from June 7 to October 6, 1861.
- Surgeon William O'Meagher, from October 10, 1861, to June 22, 1863.
- Assistant Surgeon William O'Meagher, from June 8, 1861, to October 10, 1861.
- Assistant Surgeon John P. Phillips, from October 11, 1861, to February 20, 1863.
- Assistant Surgeon William B. Schermerhorn, from September 6, 1862, to June 22, 1863.
- Chaplain Peter Tissot, S.J., from May 25, 1861, to June 22, 1863.

== Medal of Honor Recipients ==
- James Rowan O'Beirne. Commanded Company C during Battle of Seven Pines between May 31, 1862 – June 1, 1862, awarded Medal of Honor for gallantly maintaining the line of battle until ordered to fall back.
- Timothy Fallon. Age at muster, 23 years. Enlisted, May 25, 1861, at New York City, to serve two years; mustered in as private, Company K, June 7, 1861; discharged, Dec. 13, 1862, to re-enlist in Battery K, Fourth United States Artillery; awarded the Medal of Honor, Feb. 7, 1891, for gallantry in action in Battle of Williamsburg, Virginia, Battle of Seven Pines, Virginia, and Big Shanty, Ga. At Williamsburg, Virginia, assisted in driving rebel skirmishers to their main line. Participated in action, at Fair Oaks, Virginia, though excused from duty because of disability. In a charge with his company at Big Shanty, Ga., was the first man on the enemy's works.
- Martin Conboy. Age at muster, 34 years. Enlisted, Aug. 2, 1861, at New York City, to serve two years; mustered in as private, Company K, Aug. 3, 1861; transferred to Company B and promoted sergeant, Dec. 9, 1861; first sergeant, no date; mustered in as second lieutenant, Oct. 20, 1862; mustered out with company, June 22, 1863, at New York City. During the Battle of Williamsburg he took command of the company in action, the captain having been wounded, the other commissioned officers being absent, and handled it with skill and bravery. For this service he was awarded the Medal of Honor. Commissioned second lieutenant, Dec. 24, 1862, with rank from Oct. 20, 1862, vice J.O.C. Doyle, dismissed.

== See also ==
- List of New York Civil War regiments
- New York in the Civil War
