= 101st New York Infantry Regiment =

- Active: September 1861 – December 24, 1862
- Country: United States
- Allegiance: Union
- Branch: Infantry
- Engagements: Seven Days Battles; Battle of Oak Grove; Battle of Gaines's Mill; Battle of White Oak Swamp; Battle of Glendale; Battle of Malvern Hill; Second Battle of Bull Run; Battle of Chantilly; Battle of Fredericksburg

The 101st New York Infantry Regiment (a.k.a. "Union Brigade" and "2nd Onondaga County Regiment") was an infantry regiment in the Union Army during the American Civil War.

== Service ==
The 101st New York Infantry was organized at Buffalo, New York, and mustered in for three years service in January 1862 under the command of Colonel Enrico Fardella.

The regiment was attached to Wadsworth's Command, Military District of Washington, to May 1862. Whipple's Brigade, Defenses of Washington to June 1862. 2nd Brigade, 3rd Division, III Corps, Army of the Potomac, to August 1862. 2nd Brigade, 1st Division, III Corps, to December 1862.

The 101st New York Infantry ceased to exist on December 24, 1862 when it was consolidated with the 37th New York Volunteer Infantry.

== Detailed service ==
Left New York for Washington, D.C., March 9, 1862. Duty in the defenses of Washington, D.C., until June 1862. Ordered to join the Army of the Potomac on the Virginia Peninsula June 1862. Seven days before Richmond June 25 – July 1. Battles of Oak Grove June 25, Jordan's Ford June 27, White Oak Swamp, Glendale June 30, and Malvern Hill July 1. At Harrison's Landing until August 16. Movement to Fort Monroe, then to Centreville, August 16–26. Pope's campaign in northern Virginia, August 26 – September 2. Battle of Groveton, August 29. Second Battle of Bull Run, August 30. Battle of Chantilly, September 1. Guarding fords of the Monocacy until October 11. Movement up the Potomac and to Falmouth, Virginia, October 11 – November 19. Battle of Fredericksburg, Virginia, December 12–15.

== Casualties ==
The regiment lost a total of 74 men during service; one officer and 24 enlisted men killed or mortally wounded, one officer and 48 enlisted men died of disease. One mortal casualty, John Mahay, wounded at Second Bull Run, was written about by Walt Whitman in his Memoranda during the War, a chronicle of the poet's volunteer work in the war hospitals around Washington.

== Commanders ==
- Colonel Enrico Fardella
- Colonel George F. Chester

== Medal of Honor Citations ==
- Martin Conboy: “ Took command of the company in action, the captain having been wounded, the other commissioned officers being absent, and handled it with skill and bravery”

== See also ==
- List of New York Civil War regiments
- New York in the Civil War
