= Gustavus Sniper =

Gustavus A. Sniper
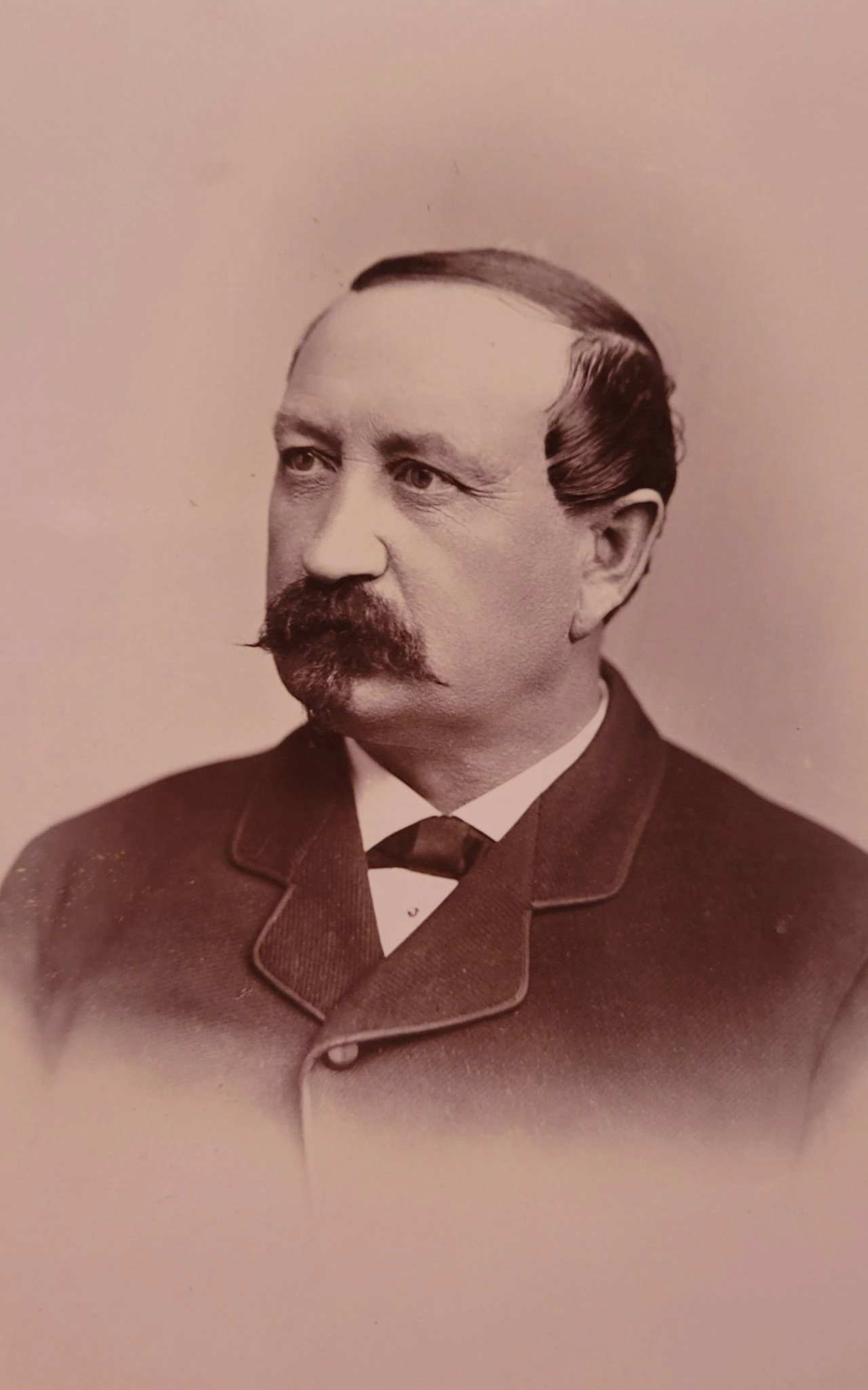
- Born: June 11, 1836; Grand Duchy of Baden
- Died: March 29, 1894 (aged 57); Syracuse, New York, US
- Burial place: Woodlawn Cemetery, Syracuse New York
- Spouse: Catherine Miller
- Military career
- Service years: 1862-1863; September 1864-June 1865
- Rank: Brevet brigadier general
- Units: 101st New York Infantry Regiment 1862-1863, 185th New York Infantry Regiment 1864-1865
- Conflicts: Battle of Fredericksburg, Battle of Lewis's Farm
- Memorials: Gustavus Sniper Memorial, Syracuse New York

Gustavus Sniper (June 11, 1836 – March 29, 1894) was a Grand Duchy of Baden-born Union brevet brigadier general during the period of the American Civil War. He received his appointment as brevet brigadier general dated to March 13, 1865.

== Biography ==
Sniper was born in Freiburg im Breisgau, Grand Duchy of Baden. He emigrated with his family to Syracuse, New York in 1842, where he was educated in Syracuse public schools, and supplemented his education by attending night school. As an adult he worked in a cigar-making business. Sniper was a member of the Republican Party and opposed slavery.

In 1854, he joined the Syracuse Light Guards and also held offices with the Syracuse Grays and the Davis Light Guards. When the Civil War broke out, he organized a company of Onondaga County men for the 12th New York Volunteer Infantry. He also organized a company for the 24th New York Volunteer Infantry Regiment also from Onondaga County. However, his first service in the field was with the 101st New York Volunteer Infantry where he rose in rank from lieutenant to captain. In 1863, he returned home to New York briefly to get married, but he soon returned to war as a lieutenant colonel with the 185th New York Volunteer Infantry. He saw action in Virginia at Petersburg and Hatchers Run. In February 1865, he was made the regiment's colonel. In March 1865, he saw action at the Battle of White Oak Road and the Battle of Quaker Road outside Petersburg.

After the war, he was elected county clerk, deputy collector of internal revenue, and to the New York State Assembly three times.

Sniper died in 1894 at his home at 504 North Prospect Street, and was buried in Syracuse's Woodlawn Cemetery.

== Honors ==
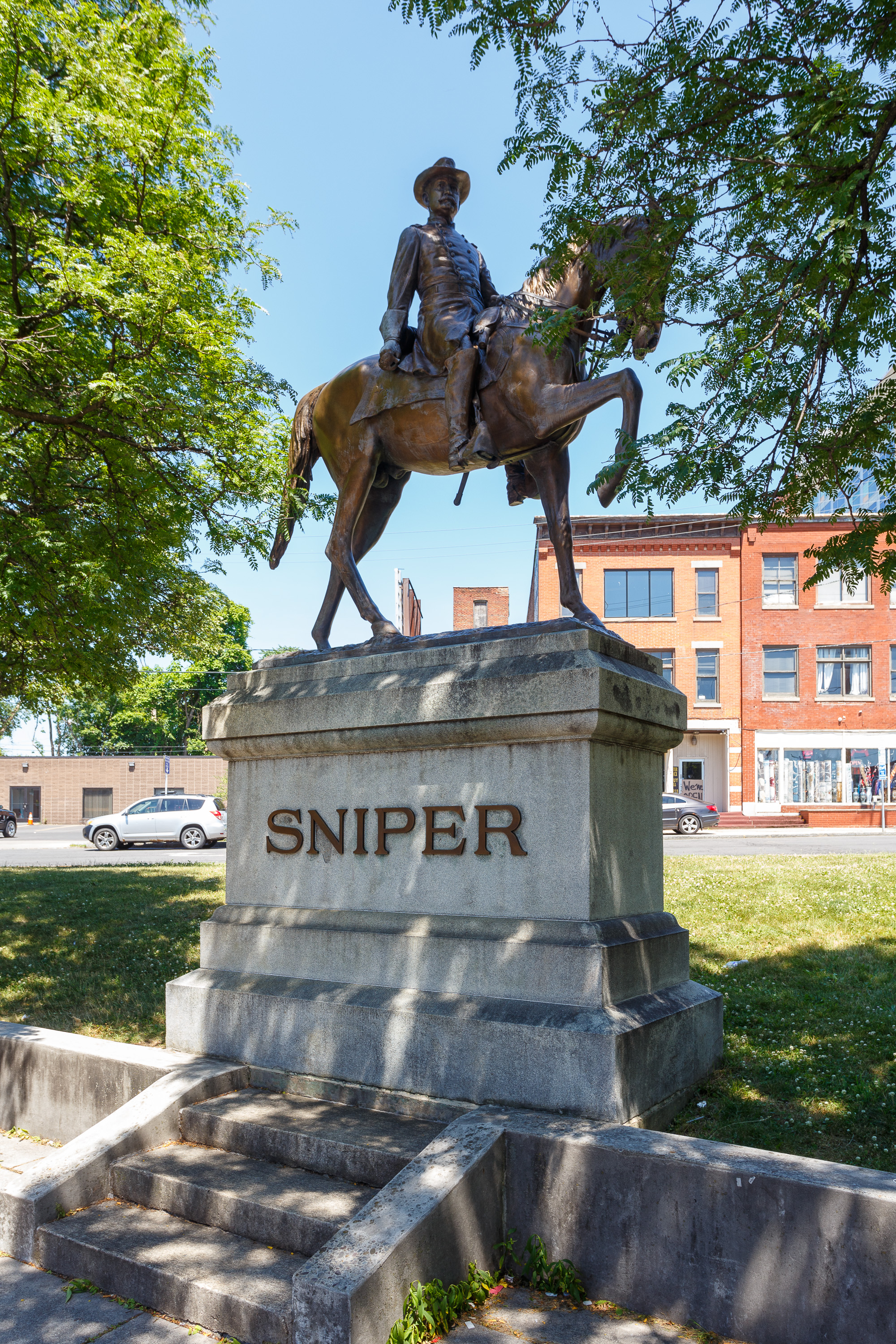
Gustavus Sniper statue at Schlosser Park, Syracuse, New York

On Decoration Day, May 30, 1905, an equestrian statue of Sniper was unveiled in what was then known as Schlosser Park, a small triangle of grass on Syracuse’s northside, bordered by North Salina, North State, and East Laurel streets. The statue's sword was stolen many times, until the city stopped replacing it in the 1950s. It is Syracuse's only equestrian statue.

New York State Assembly
| Preceded by Miles B. Hackett | New York State Assembly; Onondaga County, 3rd District; 1870–1872 | Succeeded by John I. Furbeck |
