= Joseph Gion =

- Born: c. 1826; Alsace-Lorraine, France
- Died: January 16, 1889
- Burial place: Pittsburgh, Pennsylvania
- Military career
- Allegiance: United States of America
- Branch: United States Army
- Service years: 1861 - 1864
- Rank: Private
- Unit: (New York (state)) 74th New York Volunteer Infantry Regiment
- Conflicts: Battle of Chancellorsville; American Civil War
- Awards: Medal of Honor

Joseph Gion (c. 1826 – January 16, 1889) was an American soldier who fought in the American Civil War. Gion received his country's highest award for bravery during combat, the Medal of Honor.

== Biography ==
Gion was born in Alsace-Lorraine, France. He joined the Union Army from Pittsburgh in April 1861, and mustered out with his regiment in June 1864. Gion was later buried in Pittsburgh.

His medal of honor was awarded for 'securing valuable information' under heavy fire in the Battle of Chancellorsville in Virginia on May 2, 1863. He was honored with the award on November 26, 1884.

== Medal of Honor citation ==
The President of the United States of America, in the name of Congress, takes pleasure in presenting the Medal of Honor to Private Joseph Gion, United States Army, for extraordinary heroism on 2 May 1863, while serving with Company A, 74th New York Infantry, in action at Chancellorsville, Virginia. Voluntarily and under heavy fire, Private Gion advanced toward the enemy's lines and secured valuable information.

== See also ==
- List of American Civil War Medal of Honor recipients: G–L
