= Luty =

Luty is a surname. Notable people with this surname include:

- Fritz Luty (1928–2017), American physicist
- Gotlieb Luty (1842–1904), American soldier
- Mateusz Luty (born 1990), Polish bobsledder
- Paul Luty (1932–1985), English wrestler
- Philip Luty (1965–2011), English author, activist, and gunsmith
