= Charles K. Graham =

American general (1824–1889)

Charles Kinnaird Graham
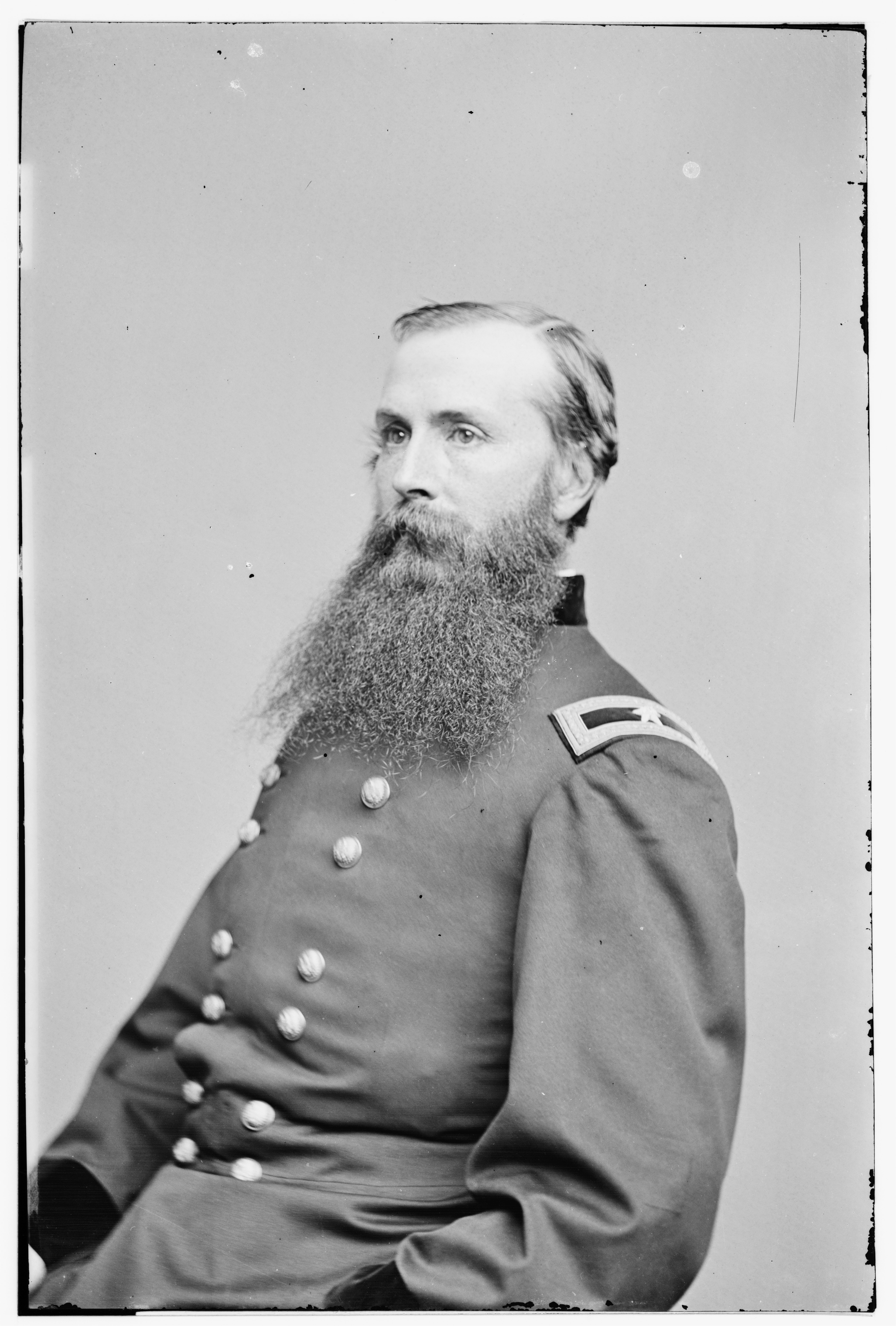
- Born: June 3, 1824; New York City, New York, U.S.
- Died: April 15, 1889 (aged 64); Lakewood, New Jersey, U.S.
- Burial place: Woodlawn Cemetery, The Bronx, New York
- Spouse: Mary (died 1888)
- Military career
- Allegiance: United States of America; Union
- Branch: United States Navy; United States Army; Union Army
- Service years: 1841–1848 (Navy); 1861–1865 (Army)
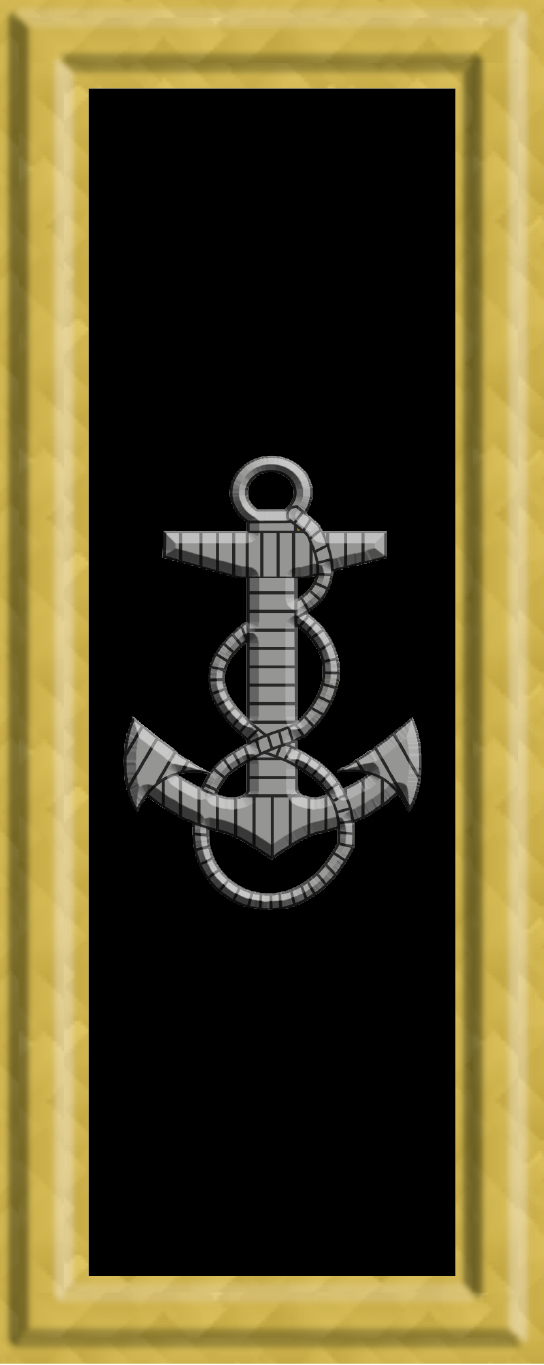
- Rank: Midshipman (Navy); Brigadier General (Army); Brevet Major General
- Commands: 74th New York Infantry; 2nd Brigade, 3rd Division, III Corps; 1st Brigade, 1st Division, III Corps; 3rd Division, III Corps (temporary); Naval Brigade, XIII Corps
- Conflicts: Mexican–American War; American Civil War; Peninsula Campaign; Battle of Chancellorsville; Battle of Gettysburg (WIA) (POW); First Battle of Fort Fisher

Charles Kinnaird Graham (June 3, 1824 – April 15, 1889) was a sailor in the antebellum United States Navy, attorney, and later a brigadier general in the Union Army during the American Civil War. As a civil engineer, he helped plan and lay out Central Park in New York City.

== Early years and education ==
Charles Kinnaird Graham was born on June 3, 1824, in the ninth ward of New York City, to John A. Graham. His father was a lawyer. He entered the Navy in October 1841, at the age of 17 and served as a midshipman in the Gulf of Mexico during the Mexican–American War, resigning his commission in May 1848. Later he studied civil engineering and was for several years after 1857 constructing engineer of the Brooklyn Navy Yard. During this time he was a major, lieutenant colonel and, finally, colonel in the New York Militia.

== Career ==
=== Civil War ===
At the outbreak of the American Civil War, on May 26, 1861, he entered the Union Army as colonel of the 74th New York Volunteer Infantry Regiment, of one of the regiments of the "Excelsior Brigade." He resigned on April 10, 1862, but was restored to the colonelcy of the regiment during the Peninsula Campaign on May 26, 1862. On November 9, 1862, he was appointed brigadier general of volunteers to rank from November 29, 1862 and assumed command of the 2nd Brigade, 3rd Division, III Corps. At the Battle of Chancellorsville he commanded the 1st Brigade, 1st Division, III Corps. Upon the mortal wounding of Amiel W. Whipple, Graham assumed command of the 3rd Division, III Corps on the last day of the battle, May 4, 1863, through June 20, 1863. He returned to command the 1st Brigade, 1st Division in June during the Gettysburg campaign. During the Battle of Gettysburg, Graham's brigade defended the Union position along the Emmitsburg Road, particularly the area of the Sherfy peach orchard. He was wounded in the hip and shoulders on July 2 and taken prisoner by the Confederates. He was sent to a prison camp in Richmond until he was exchanged (for James L. Kemper) on September 19, 1863.

Upon his recovery, he was assigned by Major General Benjamin Butler to the command of a gunboat flotilla on the James River labeled the "Naval Brigade" and was attached to the XVIII Corps, Army of the James from April 28, 1864, to February 17, 1865. Graham led the Naval Brigade during the First Battle of Fort Fisher. When the Union forces of the First Fort Fisher expedition returned to Virginia, Graham commanded the defenses of Bermuda Hundred, February 19, 1865, to March 19, 1865, and later the garrison of Norfolk, Virginia from March 19, 1865, to July 1865. He was mustered out of the volunteers on August 24, 1865.

On January 13, 1866, President Andrew Johnson nominated Graham for appointment to the grade of brevet major general of volunteers, to rank from March 13, 1865, and the United States Senate confirmed the appointment on March 12, 1866.

=== Postbellum career ===
After the war, Graham returned to New York and resumed the practice of civil engineering. From 1873 to 1875, he was chief engineer of the dock department. From 1878 to 1883, he was surveyor of the port of New York. He held the post of naval officer from 1883 to 1885. He also worked with the Broadway Pavement Commission and the Beach Pneumatic Transit Company.

== Personal life ==
Graham married Mary. His wife died in 1888.

He died of pneumonia at the Laurel House in Lakewood, New Jersey, on April 15, 1889. He was buried in Woodlawn Cemetery, The Bronx, New York City.

== See also ==
- List of American Civil War generals (Union)
