= 185th New York Infantry Regiment =

- Active: August 26, 1864 – May 30, 1865
- Country: United States
- Allegiance: Union
- Branch: Infantry
- Engagements: Siege of Petersburg; Battle of Boydton Plank Road; Battle of Hatcher's Run; Appomattox Campaign; Battle of Lewis's Farm; Battle of White Oak Road; Battle of Five Forks; Third Battle of Petersburg; Battle of Appomattox Court House

The 185th New York Infantry Regiment was an infantry regiment in the Union Army during the American Civil War.

== Service ==
The 185th New York Infantry was organized August 26, 1864, at Syracuse, New York, and mustered on September 19, 1864, for one-year service under the command of Colonel Edwin S. Jenney.

The regiment was attached to 1st Brigade, 1st Division, V Corps, Army of the Potomac, to May 1865.

The 185th New York Infantry mustered out of service May 30, 1865, in Washington, D.C. Veterans and recruits were transferred to the 5th New York Veteran Volunteer Infantry.

== Detailed service ==
Left New York for Petersburg, Va., September 27, 1864. Siege of Petersburg, Va., October 1, 1864 to April 2, 1865. Boydton Plank Road, Hatcher's Run, October 27–28, 1864. Warren's Raid on Weldon Railroad December 7–12. Dabney's Mills, Hatcher's Run, February 5–7, 1865. Appomattox Campaign March 28-April 9. Lewis Farm, near Gravelly Run, March 29. Junction of Boydton and Quaker Roads March 29. White Oak Road March 31. Five Forks April 1. Pursuit of Lee April 3–9. Appomattox Court House April 9. Surrender of Lee and his army. March to Washington, D. C., May 1–12. Grand Review of the Armies May 23.

== Casualties ==
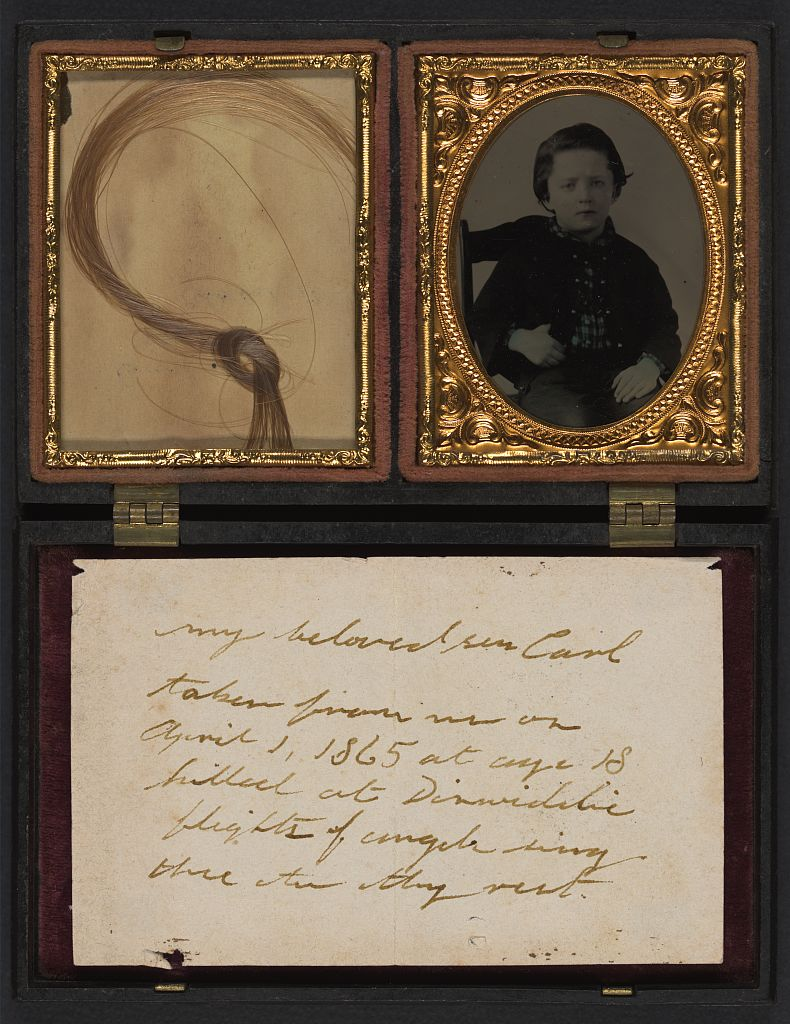
Pvt Carlos E Rodgers of the 185th N.Y. Infantry killed March 30/31 or April 1, 1865 Va

The regiment lost a total of 98 men during service; 3 officers and 53 enlisted men killed or mortally wounded, 3 officers and 39 enlisted men died of disease.

== Commanders ==
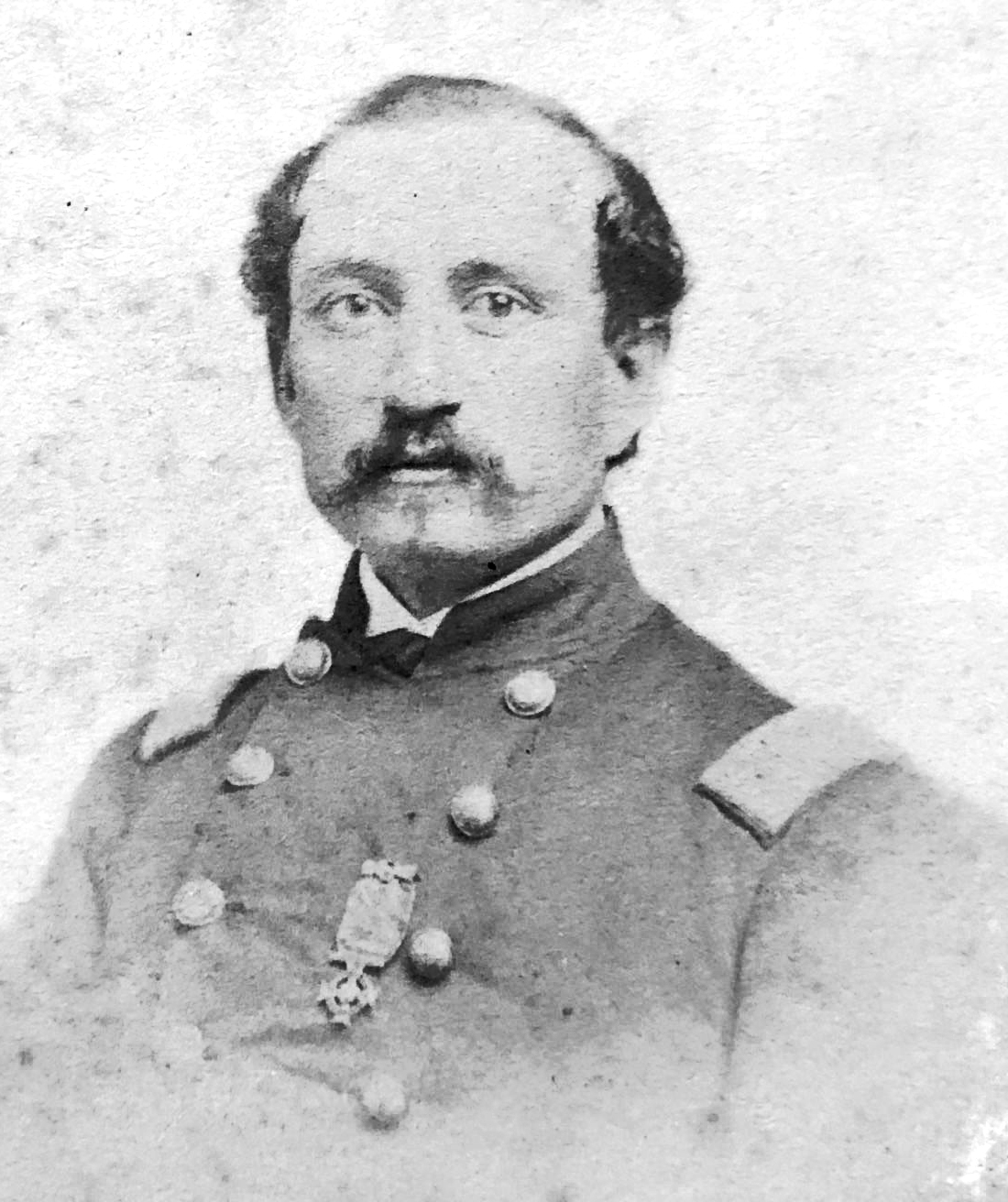
Gustavus Sniper

- Colonel Edwin S. Jenney - resigned February 3, 1865
- Colonel Gustavus Sniper

== Notable members ==
- Private Adelbert Everson, Company D - Medal of Honor recipient for action at the Battle of Five Forks

== See also ==
- List of New York Civil War regiments
- New York in the Civil War
