= Felix Brannigan =

Irish soldier and Medal of Honor recipient

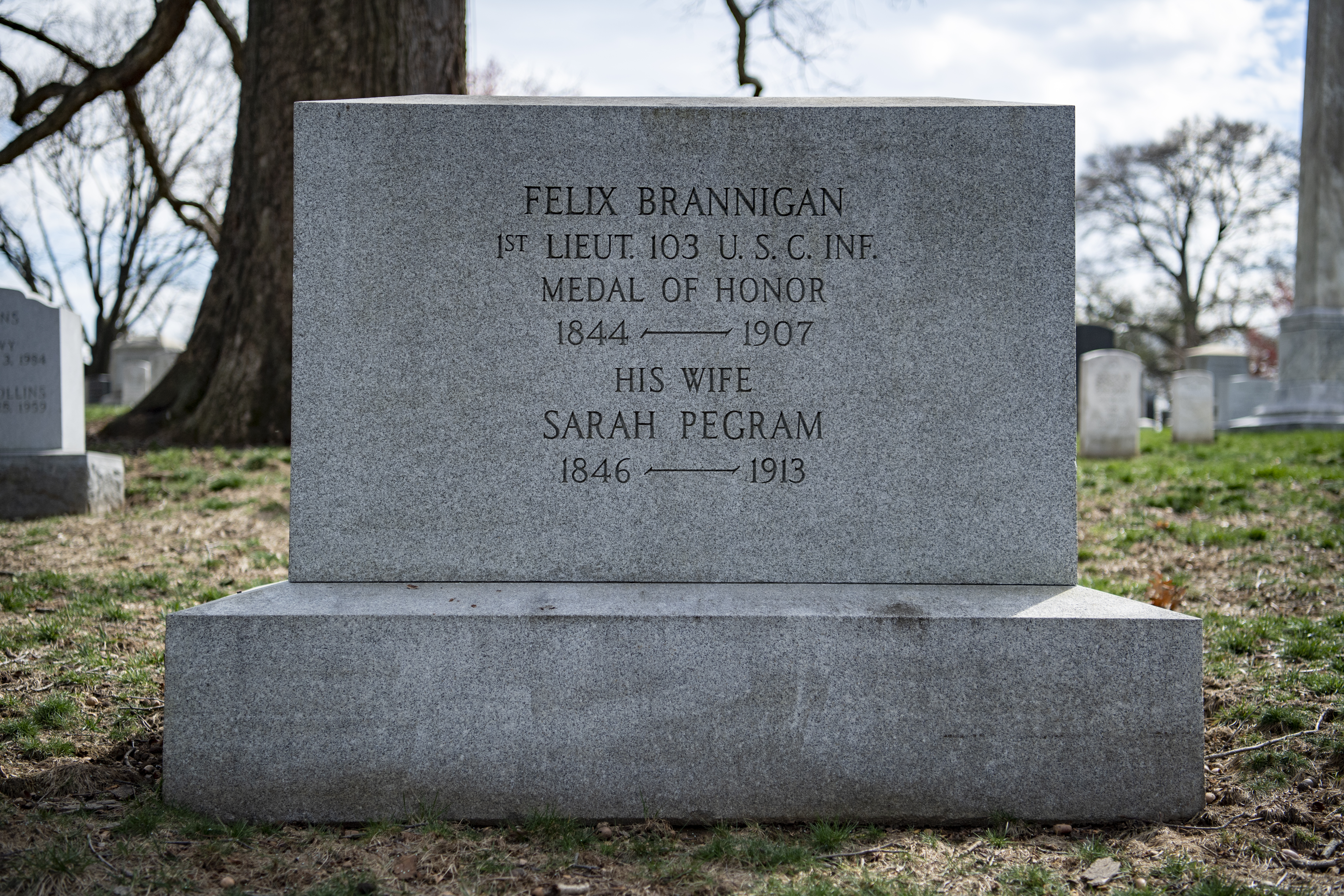
- Grave at Arlington National Cemetery
- Born: 1844; Ireland
- Died: June 10, 1907 (aged 62–63)
- Burial place: Arlington National Cemetery
- Military career
- Allegiance: United States of America
- Branch: United States Army; Union Army
- Rank: First Lieutenant
- Unit: (New York (state)) 74th Regiment New York Volunteer Infantry
- Conflicts: Battle of Chancellorsville
- Awards: Medal of Honor

Felix Brannigan (1844 -– June 10, 1907) was an Ireland-born soldier who received the Medal of Honor for valor during the American Civil War.

== Biography ==
Brannigan enlisted in the Army from Pittsburgh, Pennsylvania, in April 1861. He was assigned to the 74th New York Volunteer Infantry Regiment and was promoted to First Sergeant in June 1862, but was reduced in rank to Private in October. He transferred to the 40th New York Infantry in August 1864, and was later commissioned as an officer in the 103rd US Colored Infantry. He received the Medal of Honor on June 29, 1866, for his actions at the Battle of Chancellorsville.

== Medal of Honor citation ==
Citation:

Volunteered on a dangerous service and brought in valuable information.

== See also ==
- List of American Civil War Medal of Honor recipients: A-F
