= Adelbert Everson =

American Civil War soldier (1841–1913)

Adelbert N. Everson
- Born: April 12, 1841; Cicero, New York, US
- Died: July 23, 1913 (aged 72); Brewerton, New York, US
- Burial place: Riverside Cemetery; Brewerton, New York, US
- Military career
- Allegiance: United States of America
- Branch: United States Army; Union Army
- Rank: Private
- Units: (New York (state)) Company D, 185th New York Infantry
- Conflicts: Battle of Five Forks
- Awards: Medal of Honor

Adelbert N. Everson (April 12, 1841 – July 23, 1913) was an American soldier who fought in the American Civil War. Everson received the country's highest award for bravery during combat, the Medal of Honor, for his action during the Battle of Five Forks in Virginia on 1 April 1865. He was honored with the award on 10 May 1865.

== Biography ==
Everson was born in Cicero, New York, on 12 April 1841. He enlisted in the 185th New York Infantry. He died on 23 July 1913 and his remains are interred at the Riverside Cemetery in Brewerton, New York.

== Medal of Honor citation ==
Capture of the enemy flag.

== See also ==
- List of American Civil War Medal of Honor recipients: A–F
