= Eugene P. Jacobson =

German born soldier and recipient of the Medal of Honor

Eugene Philip Jacobson (May 3, 1841 - April 12, 1881) was a German born soldier and recipient of the Medal of Honor who received the award for actions during the American Civil War.

== Biography ==
Jacobson was born in Prussia on May 3, 1841. He moved to America sometime between his birth and the start of the American Civil War. During the war, he served as a sergeant major with the 74th New York Volunteer Infantry Regiment. He earned his medal in action at the Battle of Chancellorsville, Virginia on May 2, 1863. He eventually reached the rank of brevet captain in the U.S volunteers. He died in Denver, Colorado on April 12, 1881, and is buried in Green Mount Cemetery, Baltimore, Maryland.

== Medal of Honor Citation ==
For extraordinary heroism on 2 May 1863, in action at Chancellorsville, Virginia, for bravery in conducting a scouting party in front of the enemy.
