= Gotlieb Luty =

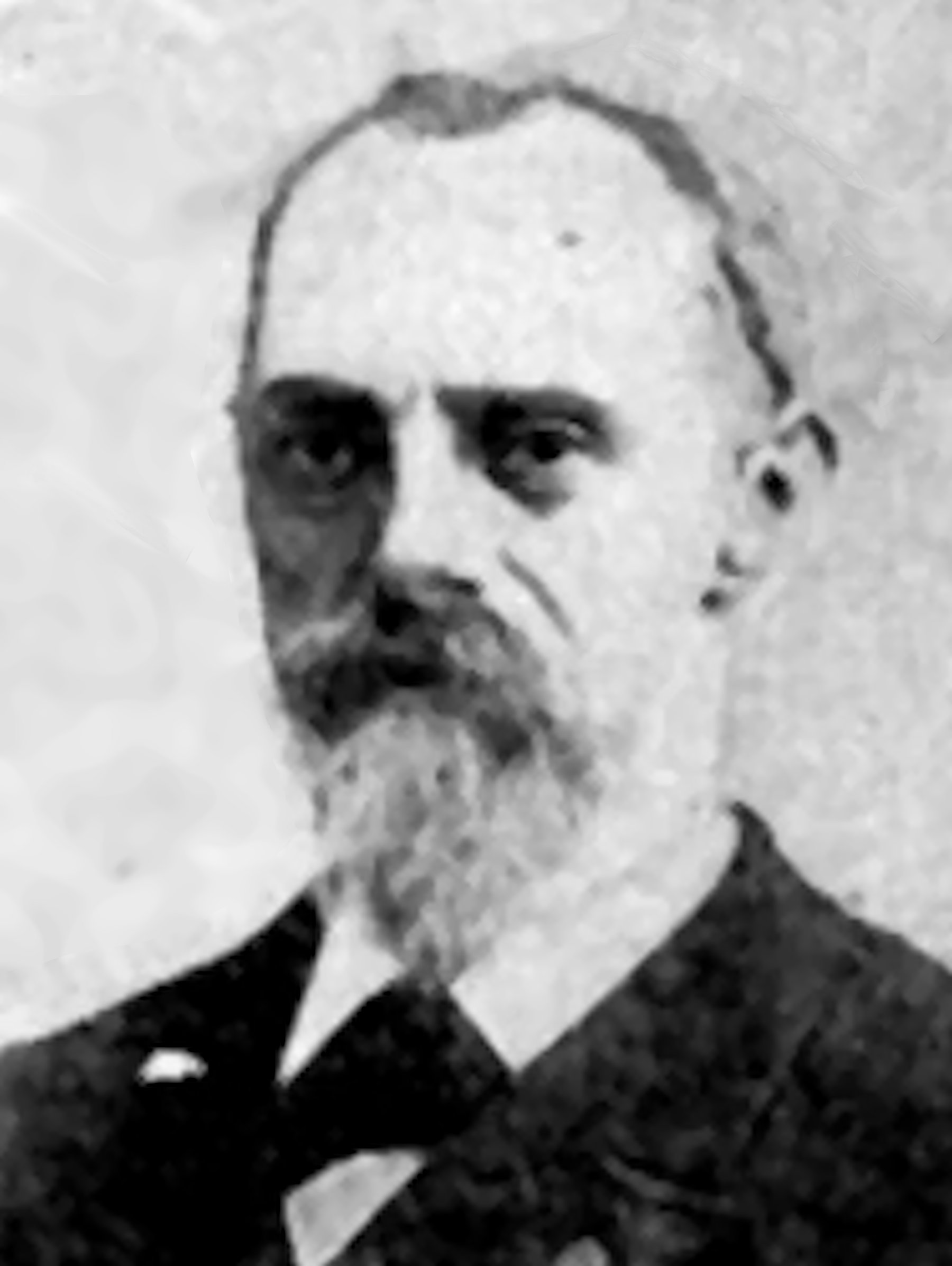
- Born: 1842; Pittsburgh, Pennsylvania
- Died: 1904 (aged 61–62)
- Military career
- Allegiance: United States of America; Union
- Branch: United States Army; Union Army
- Service years: 1861 - 1863
- Rank: Sergeant
- Units: (New York (state)) Company A, 74th New York Volunteer Infantry Regiment
- Conflicts: American Civil War
- Awards: Medal of Honor

Gotlieb Luty (1842–1904) was a corporal in the Union Army and a Medal of Honor recipient for his actions in the American Civil War.

Luty enlisted in the Army from Pittsburgh, Pennsylvania in April 1861, and was assigned to the 74th New York Infantry. He continued serving until being wounded at the Battle of Gettysburg.

== Medal of Honor citation ==
Rank and organization: Corporal, Company A, 74th New York Infantry. Place and date: At Chancellorsville, Va., May 3, 1863. Entered service at: West Manchester, Pa. Birth: Allegheny County, Pa. Date of issue: October 5, 1876.

Citation:

Bravely advanced to the enemy's line under heavy fire and brought back valuable information.

== See also ==
- List of Medal of Honor recipients
- List of American Civil War Medal of Honor recipients: G–L
