= Martin Conboy =

Irish-born American soldier and Medal of Honor recipient (1833–1909)

Martin Conboy Sr.
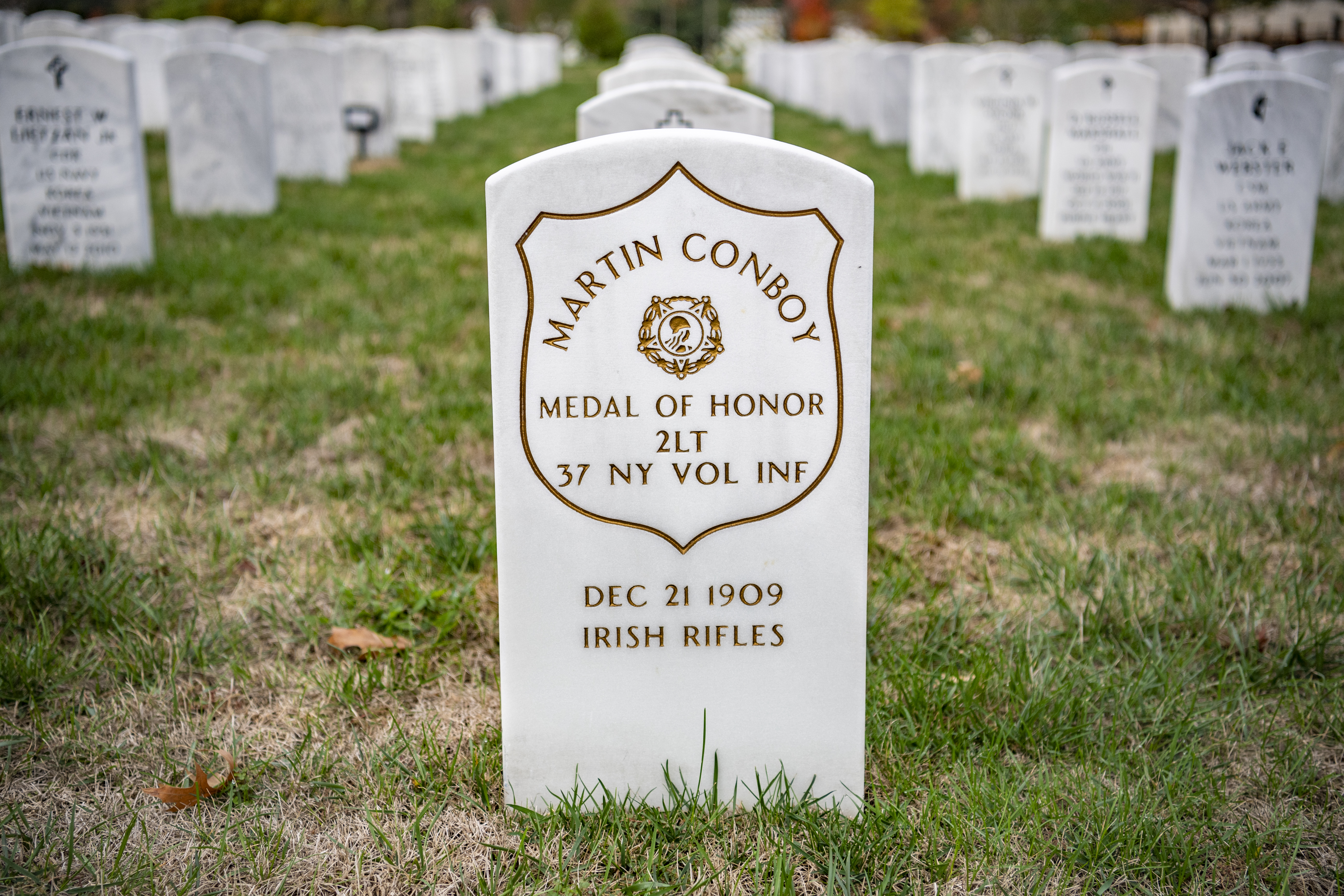
- Born: November 11, 1833; Athleague, Ireland
- Died: December 21, 1909 (aged 76); New Jersey, US
- Burial place: Arlington National Cemetery
- Military career
- Allegiance: United States of America
- Branch: United States Army
- Service years: 1861–1863
- Rank: Second Lieutenant
- Unit: (New York (state)) 37th Regiment, New York Volunteer Infantry
- Conflicts: Battle of Williamsburg
- Awards: Medal of Honor

Martin Conboy Sr. (1833 – December 21, 1909) was an Irish-born soldier who fought in the American Civil War. Conboy received the United States' highest award for bravery during combat, the Medal of Honor, for his action during the Battle of Williamsburg in Virginia on 5 May 1862. He was honored with the award on 11 October 1892.

== Biography ==
Martin was born in 1833 to Roger Conboy and Sarah Murry in Athleague, Ireland. The oldest of 6 children, Martin immigrated to New York City in 1860, where he soon enlisted in the United States Army in August 1861. He was commissioned as a Second Lieutenant in December 1862 in 37th 37th New York Volunteer Infantry Regiment, nicknamed the "Irish Rifles".

After settling down in Washington DC following the war, Martin and his wife Bridgett Harlow (also from Roscommon, Ireland) had a son Martin Jr., a devout Irish Catholic who, through his legal acumen and personal relationships with both Franklin Delano Roosevelt and Éamon de Valera (Taoiseach of the Republic of Ireland), went on to become an important figure in the fight for Irish independence from Britain.

Martin Conboy Sr died on 21 December 1909, and his remains were initially interred at the Holy Sepulchre Cemetery in New Jersey. In 2001 he was reinterred at Arlington National Cemetery.

== Medal of Honor citation ==
Took command of the company in action, the captain having been wounded, the other commissioned officers being absent, and handled it with skill and bravery.

== See also ==
- List of American Civil War Medal of Honor recipients: A–F
