= John McCunn =

American judge (1820–1872)

Judge John McCunn
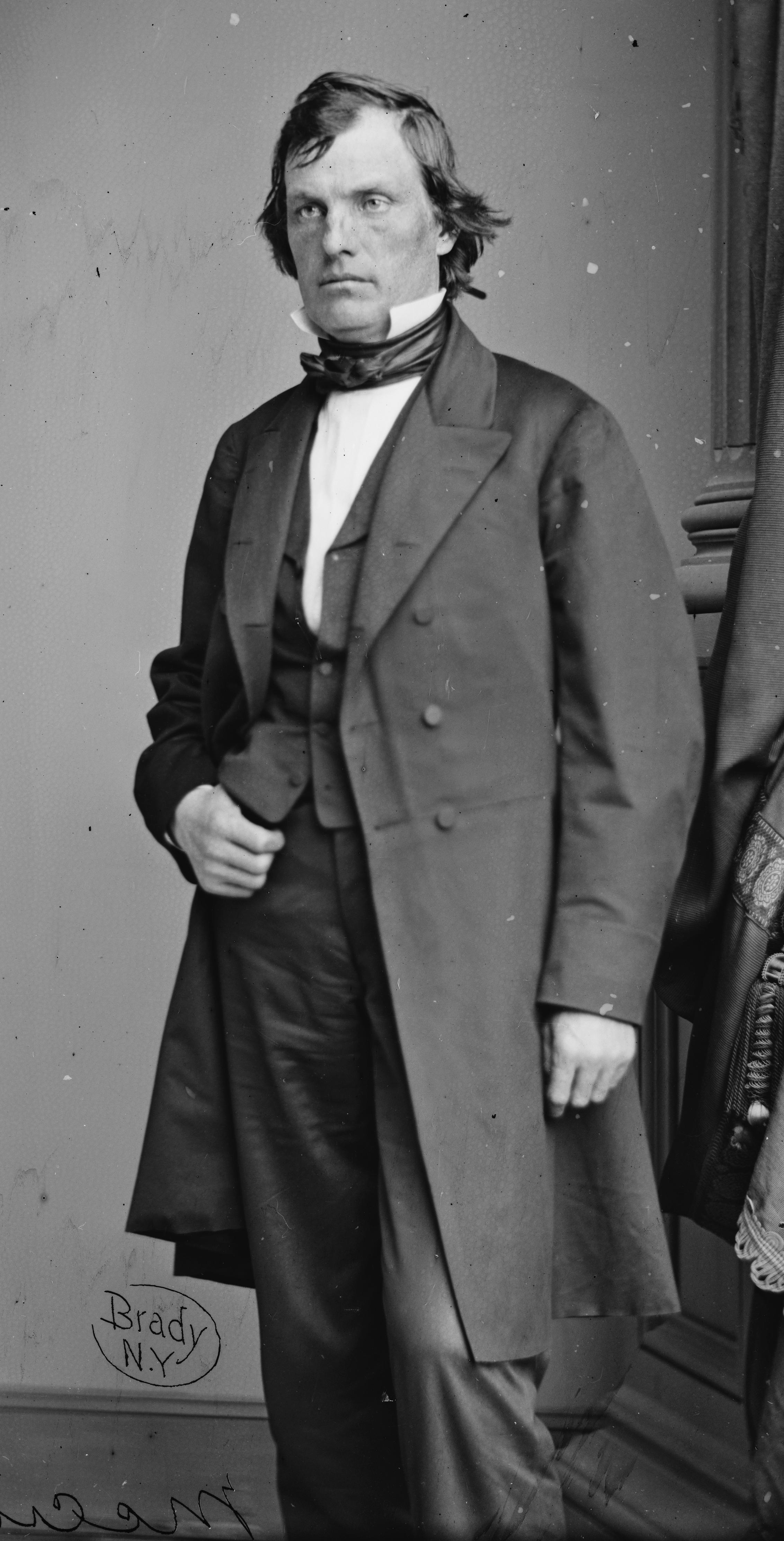
- Judge McCunn by Mathew Brady
- Born: November 2, 1820; Limavady, County Londonderry, Ireland
- Died: July 6, 1872 (aged 51); 208 West 21st Street, New York City, New York, United States
- Military career
- Branch: Union Army
- Service years: 1861–1865
- Rank: brevet brigadier general
- Unit: 69th New York Infantry Regiment
- Commands: 37th New York Infantry Regiment
- Conflicts: Battle of Blackburn's Ford

John H. McCunn (November 2, 1820 – July 6, 1872) was an Irish-born American judge, lawyer, and military officer who played a significant role during the American Civil War. He later became embroiled in political corruption and was impeached and removed from office.

== Early life and career ==
McCunn was born in Burnally, Limavady, County Londonderry, Ireland, on 2 November 1820 son of William McCunn and Martha [Matty] McKinley. He belonged to a poor Irish immigrant family who arrived in New York City in the 19th century. He worked as a dockhand before training as a lawyer, and eventually becoming a judge.

== Military service ==
When the American Civil War began in 1861 he joined the Union Army as a captain in the 69th New York Infantry Regiment before he recruited the 37th New York Infantry, which he commanded as colonel. At war's end he was brevetted brigadier general.

== Judicial and political career ==
McCunn was a member of the infamous Tweed Ring, which he aided by naturalizing new citizens to boost his election rolls. On one day alone, he naturalized over 2,000 new voters. However, when the scandal was uncovered, he was impeached and removed from his judicial office. His death a few days later was attributed to the psychological shock of his trial.
