= Martin Thomas Conboy Jr. =

American lawyer

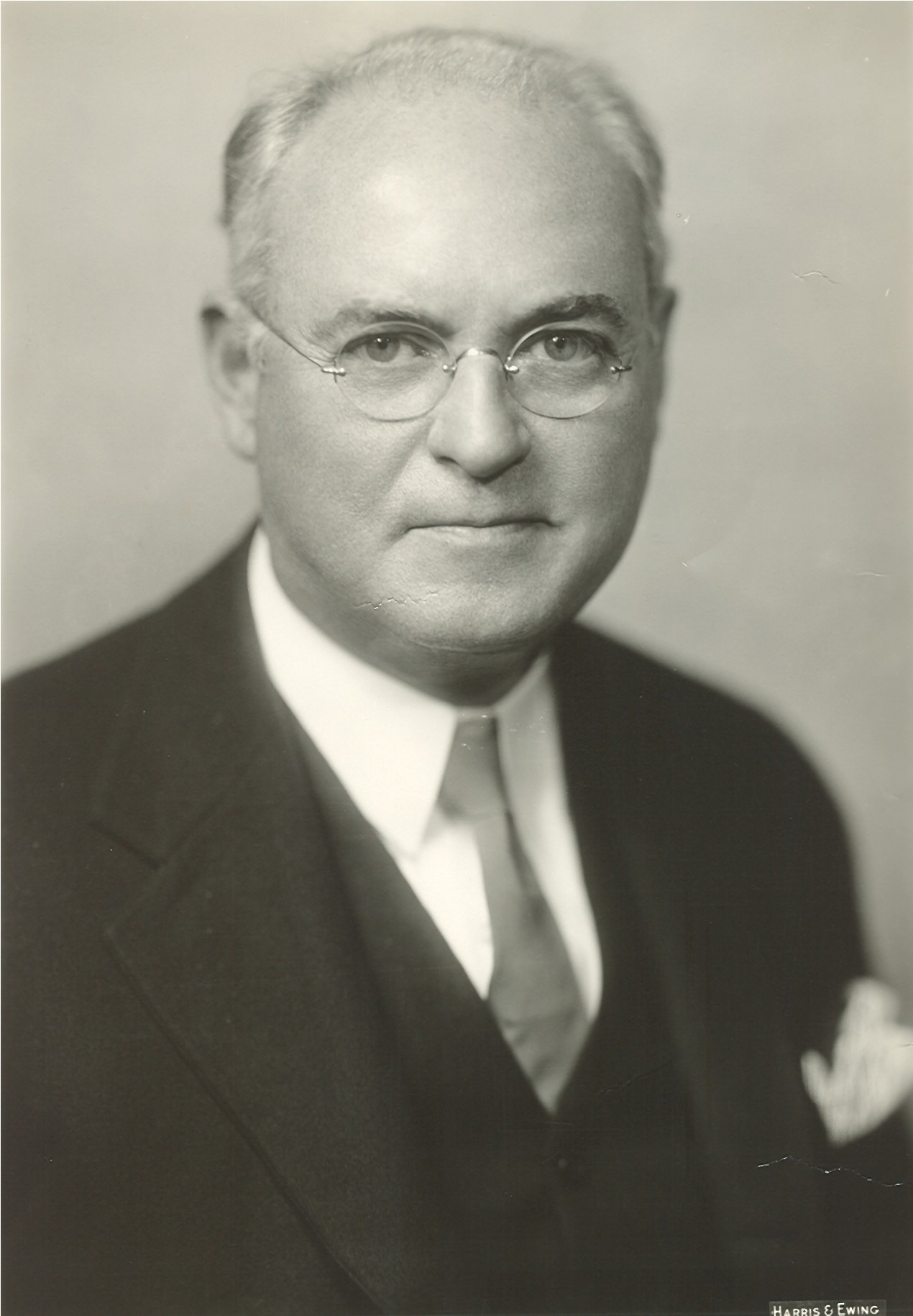

United States District Court for the Southern District of New York
- In office December 26, 1933 – March 5, 1944

Personal details
- Born: August 28, 1878 New York, New York, US
- Died: March 5, 1944 (aged 65) New York Hospital; Manhattan
- Parent: Martin Conboy
- Education: Gonzaga College High School; Georgetown University

Martin Thomas Conboy Jr. (August 28, 1878 – March 5, 1944) was a United States attorney for the United States District Court for the Southern District of New York, head of New York City Selective Service during World War I and a coordinating advisor to the New York State Selective Service during World War II.

== Biography ==
He was born on August 28, 1878, in Manhattan, New York City, to US Civil War veteran and Medal of Honor recipient, Martin Conboy, an Irish immigrant from County Roscommon, Ireland and Bridget Harlow. Like both parents, Martin Jr was a raised in a staunch Irish Catholic household and eventually would be granted knighthood in the Order of the Holy Sepulchre as well as Knight of the Holy Order of Malta by the Pope. He had a sister, Mary Conboy.

He studied at Gonzaga College High School and Georgetown University. He received an LL.B. degree in 1898 and a LL.M. degree in 1899. He married Bertha L. Mason and they had three daughters.

Mr. Conboy, a staunch Irish nationalist and leading voice among Irish Catholics in the United States, was personal friend and legal counsel to Éamon de Valera, inaugural president of the Irish Republic. Conboy represented de Valera and the Irish Republic in a US Supreme Court suit brought by the government of the Irish Free State seeking to take possession of remaining Dáil Éireann Funds held by US banks. This money, which had been raised by de Valera through the sale of bonds in the US was crucial to funding Sinn Féin and its military branch, the Irish Republican Army in the Irish War of Independence.

He was on the legal team that endeavored to ban James Joyce's Ulysses in 1921.

In 1932, Conboy was appointed to serve as special advisor to Governor of New York, Franklin D. Roosevelt, counseling the governor in matters related to a corruption investigation into the Tammany Hall mayor of New York City, Jimmy Walker. Ironically, Mr. Conboy had also served as defense counsel to the powerful Tammany Hall chieftain, Charles F. Murphy, during the 1920’s.

Following his election in the 1932 presidential election, Roosevelt tapped Conboy to serve as United States Attorney for the Southern District of New York starting on December 26, 1933.

He led the investigation the burning of the ship SS Morro Castle in 1934. In 1934 he initiated the case for the prosecution of Dutch Schultz on income tax evasion.

He resigned as U.S. Attorney for the Southern District of New York on May 15, 1935. Less than two years later, Conboy would find himself in the same New York courtroom, this time serving as defense counsel to National Crime Syndicate and Gambino Crime Family founder, Lucky Luciano.

He lived in Riverdale, New York. He died on March 5, 1944, at New York Hospital in Manhattan, New York City.

== Distinctions ==
- Holy See: Knight of the Order of Saint Gregory the Great by Pope Pius XI
- Holy See: Grand Officer of the Order of the Holy Sepulchre
- Sovereign Military Order of Malta: Knight
