= 74th New York Infantry Regiment =

American Civil War Union Army regiment

- Active: October 6, 1861 – August 3, 1864
- Country: United States of America
- Branch: Union Army (Excelsior Brigade)
- Type: Infantry
- Size: 1,100
- Nickname: Fifth Excelsior Regiment
- Engagements: American Civil War: Siege of Yorktown; Battle of Williamsburg; Battle of Seven Pines/Fair Oaks; Seven Days Battles; Manassas Station Operations; Second Battle of Bull Run; Battle of Fredericksburg; Battle of Chancellorsville; Battle of Gettysburg; Battle of Wapping Heights; Mine Run Campaign; Overland Campaign; Battle of the Wilderness; Battle of Spotsylvania Court House; Battle of North Anna; Battle of Totopotomoy Creek; Battle of Cold Harbor; Siege of Petersburg

Commanders
- Colonel: Charles K. Graham
- Lieutenant Colonel: William H. Lounsbery

Insignia
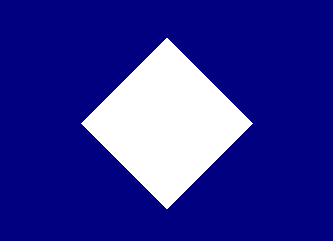
- 2nd Division, III Corps

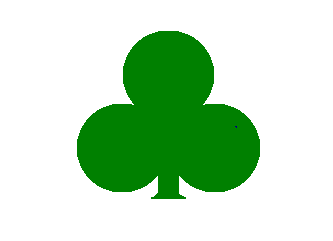
- 4th Division, II Corps

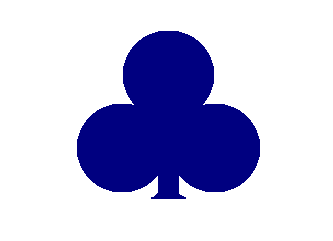
- 3rd Division, II Corps

The 74th New York Infantry Regiment was a Union regiment recruited in 1861, during the American Civil War. The regiment was part of Sickles' Excelsior Brigade and their first commander was sailor and engineer COL Charles K. Graham.

This regiment was recruited under the special authority of the War Department, issued to Congressman Sickles; organized under COL Graham at Camp Scott, Long Island, and mustered in the service of the United States for three years between June 30 and October 6, 1861. Pursuant to the orders of the Secretary of War of December 5, 1861, it received its State numerical designation December 11, 1861. August 3, 1864, the remaining men, not entitled to be discharged with their respective companies, were assigned to the 40th N. Y. Volunteers, forming new Companies G and H of the latter.

The companies were recruited principally: (Note: A number of the men had been members of the 15th Militia.)

- A, and B — U. S. Zouave Cadets — in part, at Pittsburgh, PA
- B, in part, at New York, NY
- C on Long Island, NY
- D at Cambridgeport, MA
- E, G, H, I and K at New York, NY
- F at Tidioute, PA

The regiment left the State August 20, 1861; served in Sickles' Brigade, Hooker's Division, Army of the Potomac, from September, 1861; in same, 2d, Brigade, 2d Division, 3d Corps, Army of the Potomac, from March, 1862; in 2d Brigade, 4th Division, 2d Corps, Army of the Potomac, from April, 1864; in 4th Brigade, 3d Division, 2d Corps, Army of the Potomac, from May 13, 1864; in 1st Brigade, 3d Division, 2d Corps, Army of the Potomac, from July, 1864; and it was honorably discharged and mustered out, under LTC William H. Lounsbery, by companies, before Petersburg, Va.; Company D, June 19, 1864; A, June 21; B, June 26; G, June 28; C, July 6; and E, F, H, I and K, August 3, 1864. During its service the regiment lost by death, killed in action, 6 officers, 82 enlisted men; of wounds received in action, 3 officers, 33 enlisted men; of disease and other causes, 2 officers, 68 enlisted men; total, 11 officers, 183 enlisted men; aggregate, 194; of whom 10 enlisted men died in the hands of the enemy.

The regiment participated in the Peninsula Campaign of 1862 and was particularly noted for its part at the Battle of Williamsburg. It was also present at the battles of Fredericksburg, Chancellorsville, Gettysburg and the Overland Campaign.

Four members of the regiment were awarded the Medal of Honor for their actions at the Battle of Chancellorville in May 1863, for volunteering to advance on Confederate lines under heavy fire and bring back information: privates Felix Brannigan and Joseph Gion, Corporal Gotlieb Luty, and Sergeant Major Eugene P. Jacobson.

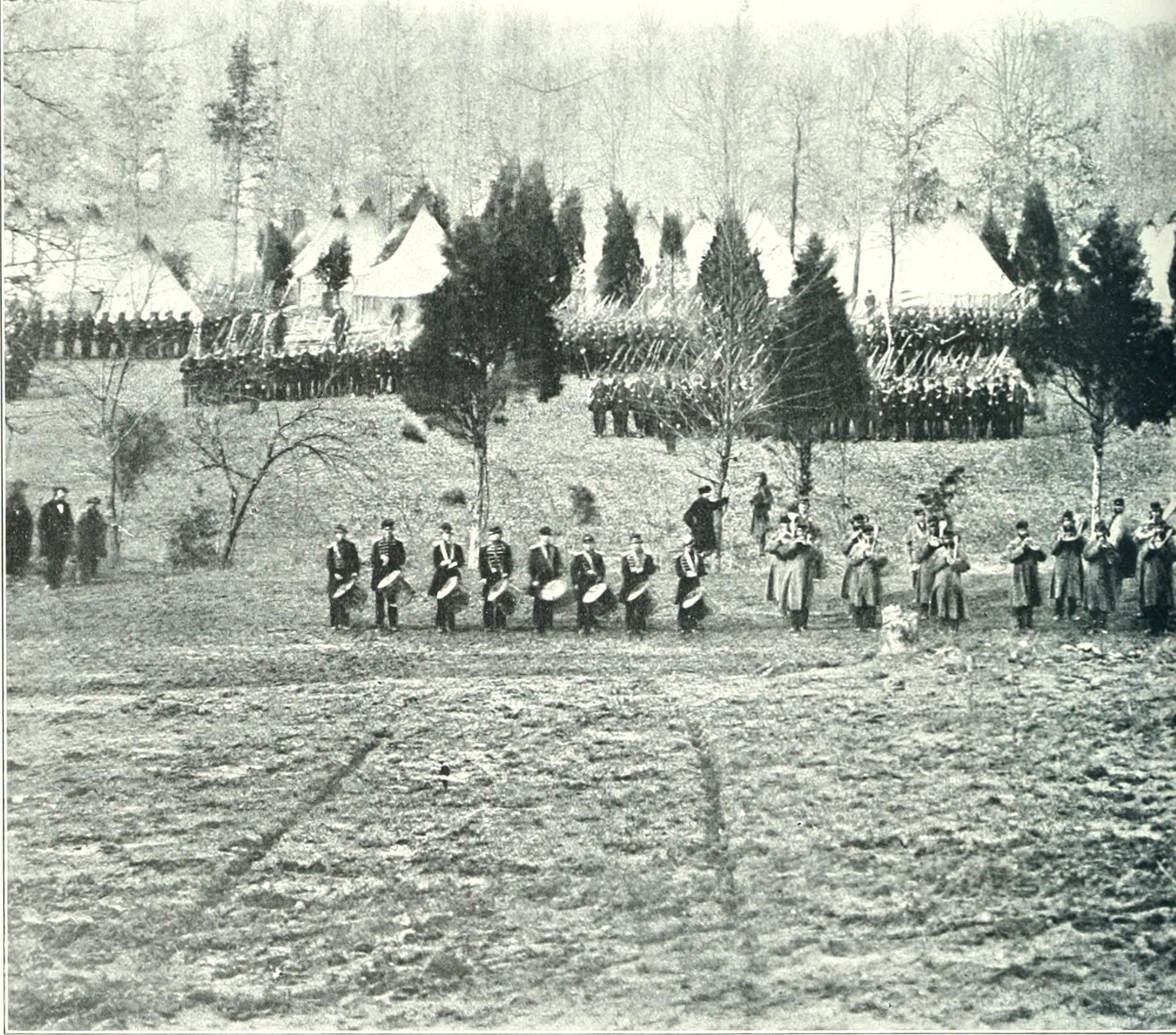

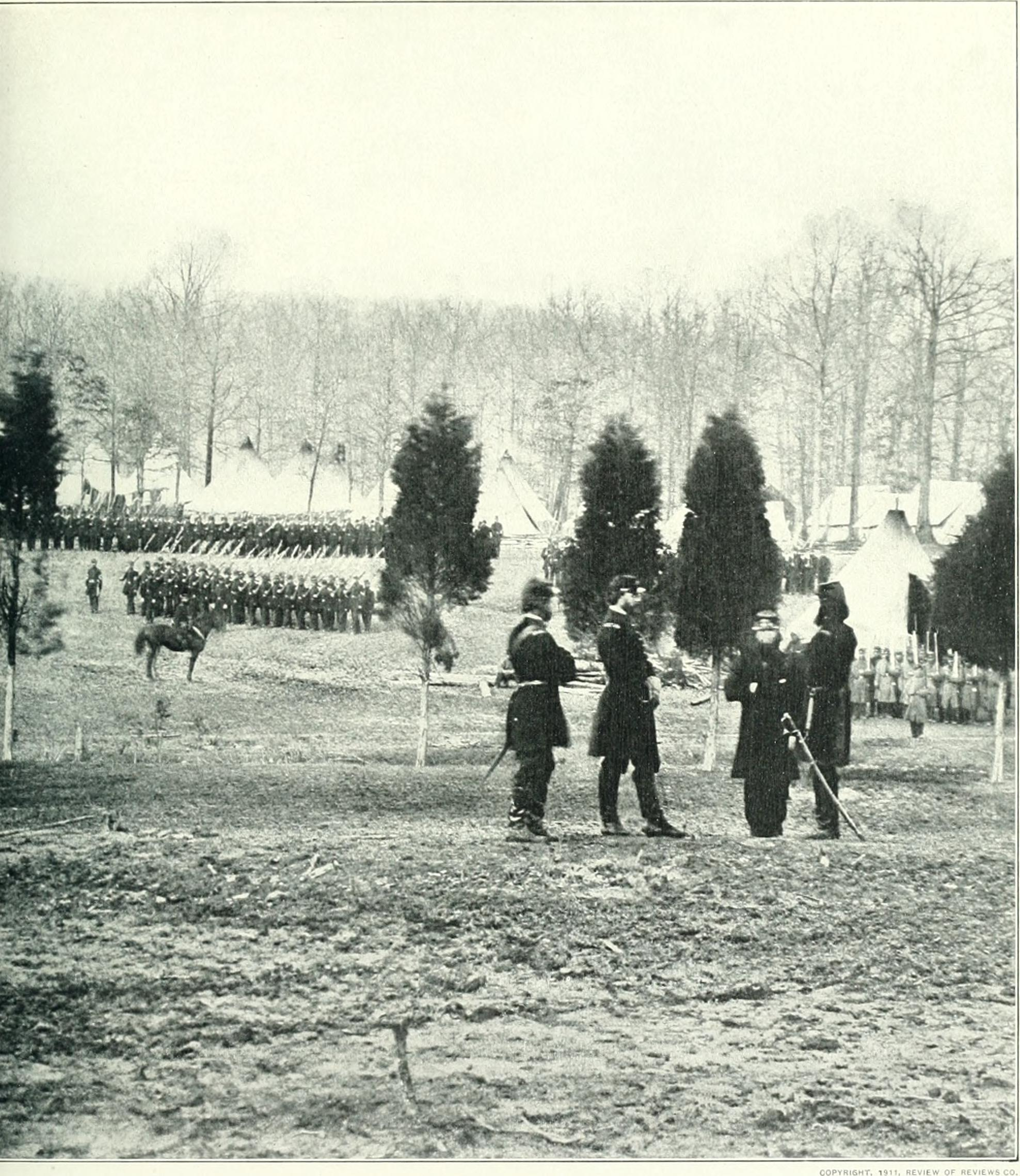

74th New York Infantry, as they drill in their camp, 1861

== Uniforms ==
Their uniform was patterned after French infantry known as chasseurs. Companies A and B however, wore a uniform modeled on the Zouaves. It consisted of a dark blue Zouave jacket with yellow trimming, a dark blue Zouave vest with yellow trimming, a sky blue sash, a red Zouave cap fez with a yellow tassel, red pantaloons with yellow trimming, deerskin jambières, and white gaiters made from canvas or drill (fabric). The uniforms of these two Zouave companies were directly patterned after those worn by the Imperial Zouaves of France, being closer to the originals than any other Zouave style uniform worn by American Zouaves in the Civil War.

== See also ==
- List of New York Civil War units
