= Battle of Oak Grove =

Battle of the American Civil War

- Part of the American Civil War
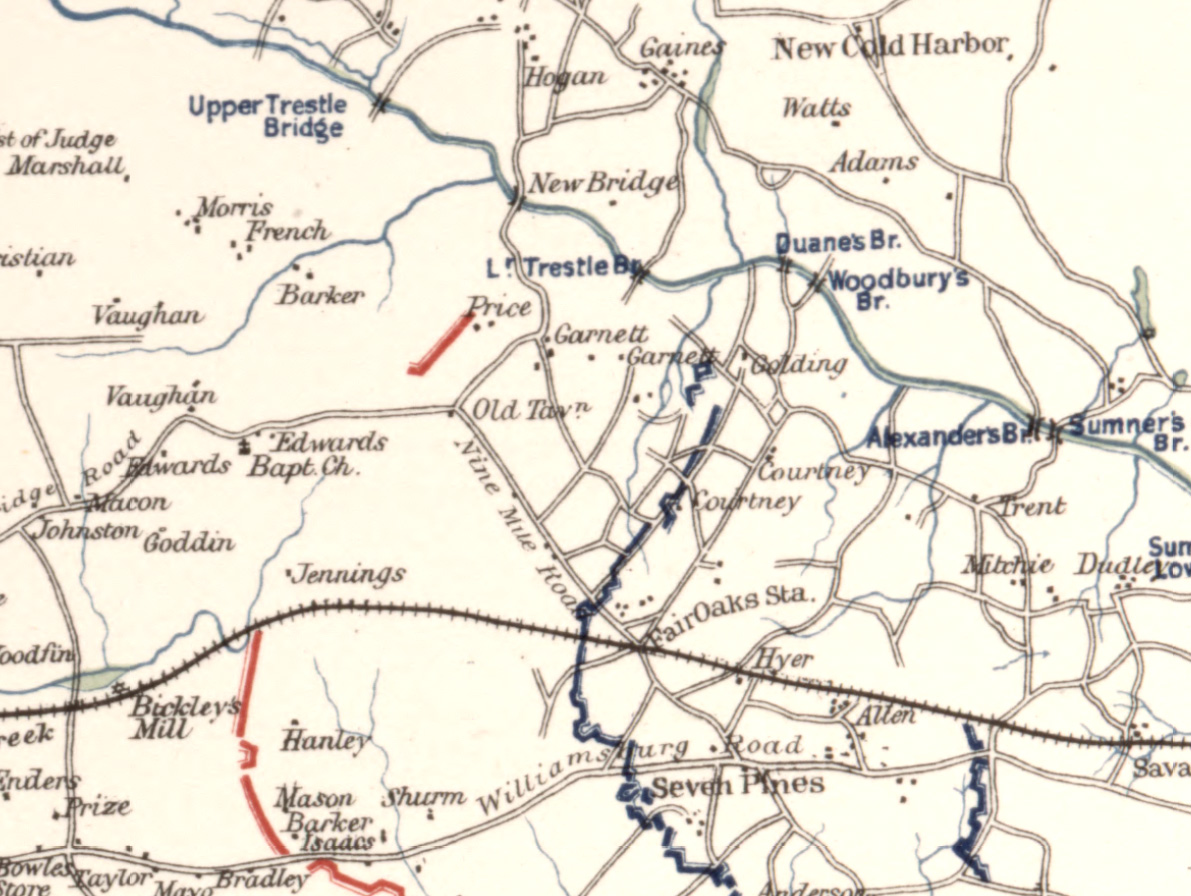
- Old Tavern area
| Date | June 25, 1862 |
| Location | Henrico County, Virginia 37.5154°N 77.3292°W |
| Result | Inconclusive |

Belligerents
| United States (Union) | (Confederate States of America) Confederate States (Confederacy) |

Commanders and leaders
| (United States) George B. McClellan (United States) Samuel P. Heintzelman | Robert E. Lee; Benjamin Huger |

Units involved
| III Corps ( (United States) Army of the Potomac) | Huger's Division ( Army of Northern Virginia) |

Strength
| 3 Brigades | 1 Division |

Casualties and losses
| 626 total 68 killed 503 wounded 55 missing | 441 total 66 killed 362 wounded 13 missing |

The Battle of Oak Grove, also known as the Battle of French's Field or King's School House, took place on June 25, 1862, in Henrico County, Virginia, the first of the Seven Days Battles (Peninsula Campaign) of the American Civil War. Maj. Gen. George B. McClellan advanced his lines with the objective of bringing Richmond within range of his siege guns. Two Union divisions of the III Corps attacked across the headwaters of White Oak Swamp, but were repulsed by Maj. Gen. Benjamin Huger's Confederate division. McClellan, who was 3 miles (4.8 km) in the rear, initially telegraphed to call off the attack, but ordered another attack over the same ground when he arrived at the front. Darkness halted the fighting. Union troops gained only 600 yards (550 m), at a cost of over a thousand casualties on both sides.

== Background ==
=== Military situation ===
Following the stalemate at the Battle of Seven Pines on May 31 and June 1, 1862, McClellan's Army of the Potomac sat passively in their positions around the eastern outskirts of Richmond. The new commander of the Army of Northern Virginia, General Robert E. Lee, used the following three and a half weeks to reorganize his army, extend his defensive lines, and plan offensive operations against McClellan's larger army. McClellan received intelligence that Lee was prepared to move and that the arrival of Maj. Gen. Thomas J. "Stonewall" Jackson's force from the Shenandoah Valley was imminent.

McClellan decided to resume the offensive before Lee could. Anticipating Jackson's reinforcements marching from the north, he increased cavalry patrols on likely avenues of approach. He wanted to advance his siege artillery about a mile and a half closer to the city by taking the high ground on Nine Mile Road around Old Tavern. In preparation for that, he planned an attack on Oak Grove, south of Old Tavern and the Richmond and York River Railroad, which would position his men to attack Old Tavern from two directions. Known locally for a stand of tall oak trees, Oak Grove was the site of Maj. Gen. D.H. Hill's assault at Seven Pines on May 31 and had seen numerous clashes between pickets since that time.

The attack was planned to advance to the west, along the axis of the Williamsburg Road, in the direction of Richmond. Between the two armies was a small, dense forest, 1,200 yards (1,100 m) wide, bisected by the headwaters of White Oak Swamp. Two divisions of the III Corps were selected for the assault, commanded by Brig. Gens. Joseph Hooker and Philip Kearny. Facing them was the division of Confederate Maj. Gen. Benjamin Huger.

== Battle ==
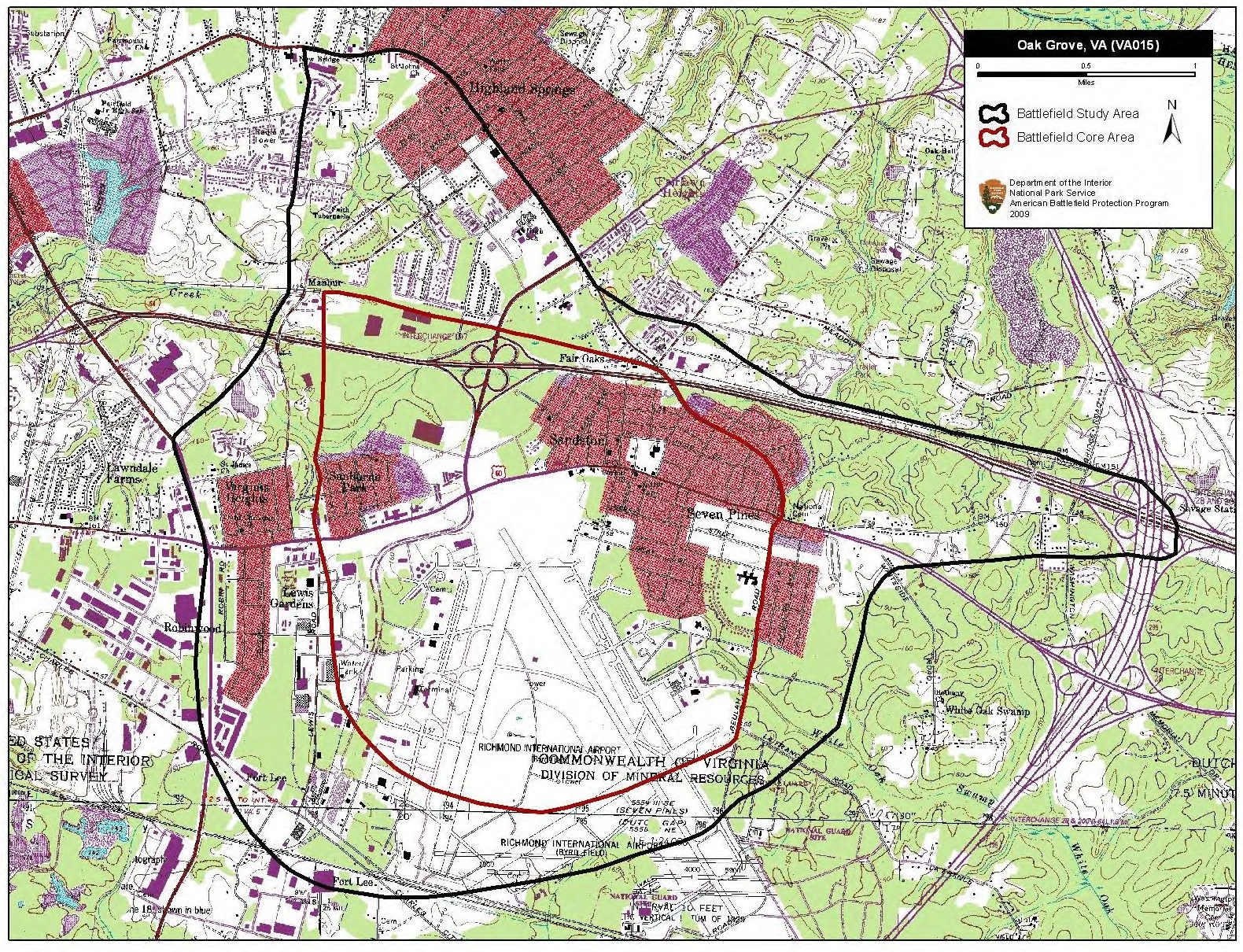
Map of Oak Grove Battlefield core and study areas by the American Battlefield Protection Program

At 8:30 a.m., June 25, three Union brigades stepped off in orderly line of battle. From right to left, they were commanded by Brig. Gen. Daniel E. Sickles (the Excelsior Brigade), Brig. Gen. Cuvier Grover, both of Hooker's division, and Brig. Gen. John C. Robinson from Kearny's division. Although Robinson and Grover made good progress on the left and in the center, Sickles's New Yorkers encountered difficulties moving through their abatis, then through the upper portions of the swamp, and finally met stiff Confederate resistance, all of which threw the Federal line out of alignment. Huger took advantage of the confusion by launching a counterattack with the brigade of Brig. Gen. Ambrose R. Wright against Grover's brigade.

Adding to the confusion, one of Wright's Georgia regiments wore red Zouave uniforms. Many of Grover's men believed that only the Union Army had Zouave units, so were reluctant to fire on their own men. When they finally realized that Union troops would not be approaching from the direction of Richmond, they opened fire. At a crucial moment in the battle, the 26th North Carolina of Brig. Gen. Robert Ransom's brigade, in their first combat engagement, delivered a perfectly synchronized volley of rifle fire against Sickles's brigade, breaking up its delayed attack and sending the 71st New York into a panicked retreat, which Sickles described as "disgraceful confusion."

Informed of Sickles's reverse, corps commander Heintzelman ordered reinforcements sent forward and also notified army commander McClellan, who was attempting to manage the battle by telegraph from 3 miles (4.8 km) away. McClellan, unaware of most details of the engagement, became alarmed and at 10:30 a.m. ordered his men to withdraw back to their entrenchments, an order that mystified his subordinates on the scene. He telegraphed that he would be arriving at the front in person, which caused a 2.5 hour lull in the action. At 1 p.m., seeing that the situation was not as bad as he had feared, McClellan ordered his men forward to retake the ground for which they had already fought once that day. The fighting lasted until nightfall.

== Aftermath ==
The minor battle was McClellan's only tactical offensive action against Richmond. His attack gained only 600 yards (550 m) at a cost of over 1,000 casualties on both sides and was not strong enough to derail the offensive planned by Robert E. Lee, which already had been set in motion. The next day, Lee seized the initiative by attacking at Beaver Dam Creek north of the Chickahominy River, near Mechanicsville, the first major battle of the Seven Days, and the beginning of a strategic retreat by the Union Army.

== See also ==
- Troop engagements of the American Civil War, 1862
- List of costliest American Civil War land battles
- Richmond in the Civil War
- Virginia in the American Civil War
- List of American Civil War battles
- List of Virginia Civil War units
