= MRS-1 =

MRS-1 may refer to:

- ALCO MRS-1, a military road switcher locomotive built by ALCO
- EMD MRS-1, a military road switcher locomotive built by EMD
