= Culture of Newport News, Virginia =

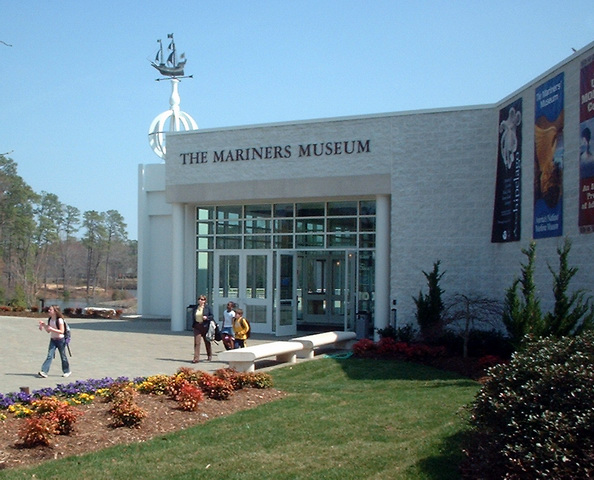
The Mariners' Museum

Near the city's western end, a historic C&O railroad station, as well as American Civil War battle sites near historic Lee Hall along U.S. Route 60 and several 19th-century plantations have all been protected. Many are located along the roads leading to Yorktown and Williamsburg, where many sites of the Historic Triangle are of both American Revolutionary War and Civil War significance. The first modern duel of ironclad warships, the Battle of Hampton Roads, took place not far off Newport News Point in 1862.

Recovered artifacts from the USS Monitor are displayed at the Mariners' Museum, one of the more notable museums of its type in the world. The museum's collection totals approximately 35,000 artifacts, of which approximately one-third are paintings and two-thirds are three-dimensional objects. The scope of the museum's collection is international. Included are 10 permanent galleries, changing and traveling exhibits, and virtual galleries available through the museum website. The collection of over 600,000 prints and 35,000 maritime artifacts is international in scope and includes miniature ship models, scrimshaw, maritime paintings, decorative arts, carved figureheads, and working steam engines.

The Virginia War Museum covers American military history. The museum's collection includes, weapons, vehicles, artifacts, uniforms and posters from various periods of American history. Highlights of the museum's collection include a section of the Berlin Wall and the outer wall of Dachau Concentration Camp.

The Peninsula Fine Arts Center contains a rotating gallery of art exhibits. The center also maintains a permanent "Hands On For Kids" gallery designed for children and families to interact in what the Center describes as "a fun, educational environment that encourages participation with art materials and concepts."

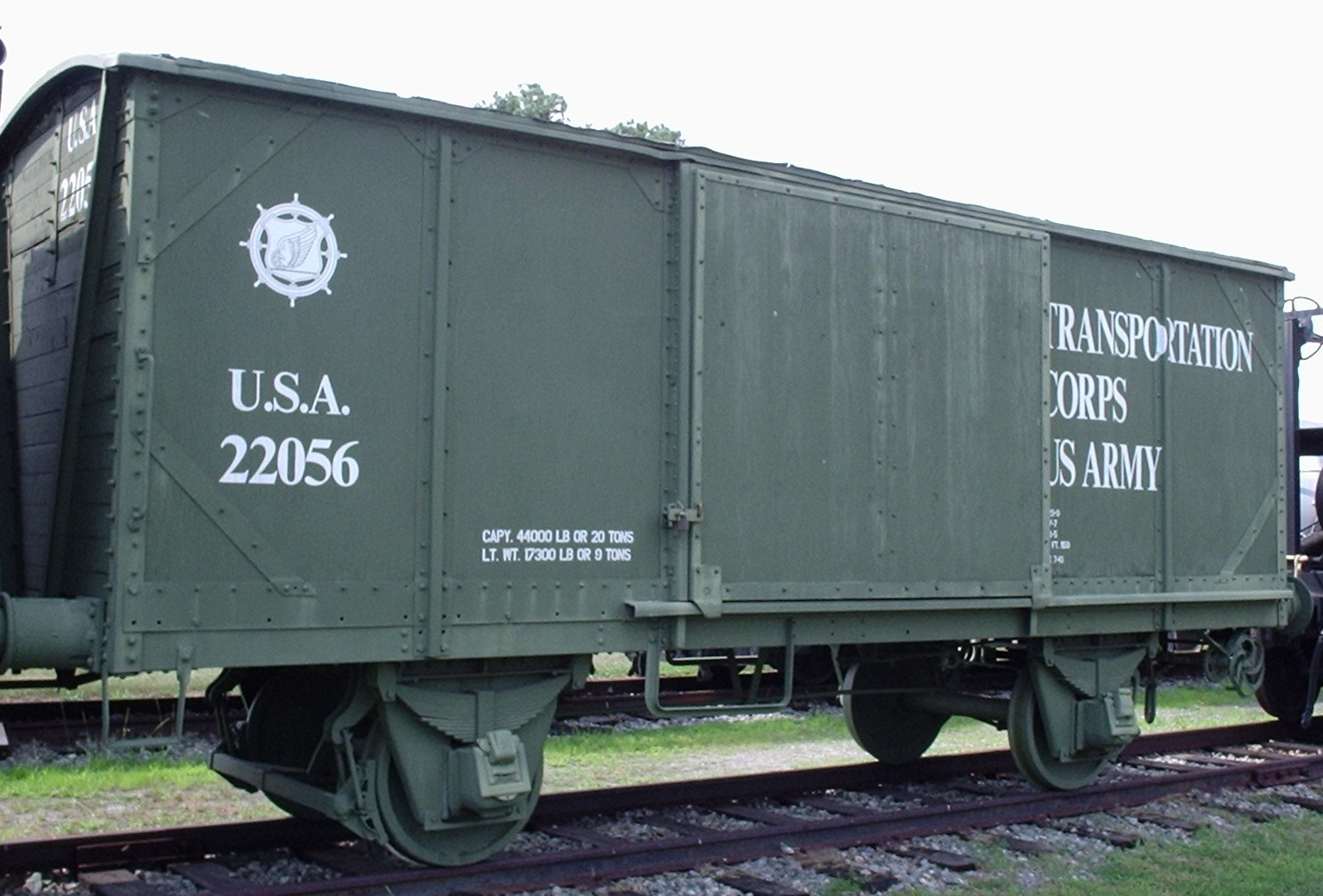
Forty-and-eights style boxcar in the Army Transportation Museum.

The U.S. Army Transportation Museum is a United States Army museum of vehicles and other U. S. Army transportation-related equipment and memorabilia. Located on the grounds of Fort Eustis, The museum reflects the history of the Army, especially of the United States Army Transportation Corps, and includes close to 100 military vehicles such as land vehicles, watercraft and rolling stock, including stock from the Fort Eustis Military Railroad. It is officially dedicated to General Frank S. Besson, Jr., who was the first four-star general to lead the transportation command, and extends over 6 acres (24,000 m^{2}) of land, air and sea vehicles and indoor exhibits. The exhibits cover transportation and its role in US Army operations, including topic areas from the American Revolutionary War through operations in Afghanistan.

The Ferguson Center for the Arts is a theater and concert hall on the campus of Christopher Newport University. The complex fully opened in September 2005 and contains three distinct, separate concert halls: the Concert Hall, the Music and Theatre Hall, and the Studio Theatre. The construction was led by two opening acts. Singer Tony Bennett performed in the Music and Theater hall on September 1, 2004. During the show, Bennett remarked: "They don't make theaters like this anymore!". Actor and singer Michael Crawford opened the Concert Hall on September 12, 2005. The New York Pops accompanied him that night.

The Port Warwick area hosts the annual Port Warwick Art and Sculpture Festival where art vendors gather in Styron Square to show and sell their art. Judges have the chance to name the best art work of the Festival.
