= EMD MRS-1 =

Diesel locomotive class

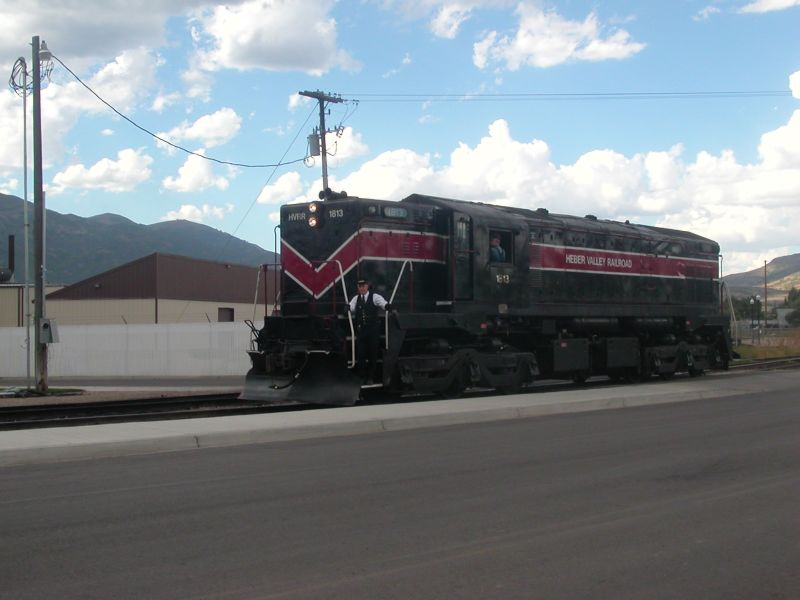
- MRS-1 #1813 on the Heber Valley Railroad
Type and origin
- Power type: Diesel-electric
- Builder: General Motors Electro-Motive Division
- Order number: 7013
- Serial number: 15873–15885
- Model: MRS-1
- Build date: March 1952 – June 1952
- Total produced: 13
Specifications
- Configuration
  - AAR: C-C
  - UIC: Co'Co'
- Gauge: 4 ft 8 1/2 in (1,435 mm); 5 ft (1,524 mm); 1,668 mm (5 ft 5 21/32 in); 5 ft 6 in (1,676 mm)
- Trucks: custom-design 3-axle multi-gauge trucks
- Wheel diameter: 40 in (1,016 mm)
- Minimum curve: 193 ft (59 m)
- Wheelbase: 44 ft 2 in (13.46 m)
  - Bogie: 13 ft 2 in (4.01 m)
- Pivot centres: 31 ft (9.4 m)
- Length
  - Over couplers: 57 ft 5 in (17.50 m) (with AAR couplers); 57 ft 8 1/2 in (17.590 m) (with Willison couplers)
- Width: 9 ft 8 in (2.95 m)
- Height: 13 ft 6 in (4.11 m)
- Axle load: 40,000 lbf (180 kN)
- Loco weight: 240,000 lb (110,000 kg)
- Fuel type: Diesel fuel
- Fuel capacity: With steam generator: 800 US gal (670 imp gal; 3,000 L); No steam generator: 1,600 US gal (1,300 imp gal; 6,100 L)
- Water cap.: For steam generator: 800 US gal (670 imp gal; 3,000 L) if fitted
- Fuel consumption: Road average: 50 gal/h (190 L/h); Full load: 95 gal/h (79 imp gal/h; 360 L/h); Idle: 3.5 gal/h (2.9 imp gal/h; 13 L/h)
- Prime mover: EMD 16-567B
- Engine type: 2-stroke diesel
- Aspiration: Roots blower
- Displacement: 9,072 cu in (148.66 L)
- Alternator: 3-phase 149 V AC, 80 kW (110 hp)
- Traction motors: 600 V DC
- Cylinders: V16
- Cylinder size: 8 1/2 in × 10 in (216 mm × 254 mm) bore x stroke
- Gear ratio: 60/17
Performance figures
- Maximum speed: 77 mph (124 km/h)
- Power output: 1,600 hp (1,190 kW)

The EMD MRS-1 is a type of diesel-electric locomotive built by General Motors Electro-Motive Division for the United States Army Transportation Corps (USATC) in 1952. They were built with multigauge trucks and to a narrow loading gauge for service anywhere in the world in the event of war. Thirteen of the locomotives were built, with serial numbers 15873–15885. At almost $500,000 each in 1952 dollars, more than three times the price of a standard locomotive of the period, these were very expensive locomotives.

Declared un-needed for wartime operations in about 1970, they were then used on various military bases around the United States, with some serving on the Alaska Railroad. Five locomotives are preserved, three currently in operating condition.

== History ==
=== Development ===
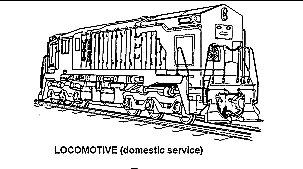
Drawing of the locomotive, used to train Army soldiers.

The Korean War and the intensification of the Cold War at the beginning of the 1950s caused the USATC to consider what it might need for a new land war in Europe. They came up with a requirement for a locomotive capable of running on the existing tracks of a wide variety of railway systems. Key parts of the specification included adjustable-gauge trucks, compact bodywork to fit restrictive loading gauges and structure gauges, replaceable couplers to fit a variety of systems, and a power output of 1,600 hp (1,200 kW). The trucks' wheelsets adjusted between standard gauge (4 ft 8 1/2 in (1,435 mm)) and Indian gauge (5 ft 6 in (1,676 mm)), which encompasses the vast majority of the broad gauges in use worldwide, including those of the then Soviet Union (1,520 mm (4 ft 11 27/32 in) Russian gauge ) and of the Iberian Peninsula (Iberian gauge 1,668 mm (5 ft 5 21/32 in)).

The specification was put out to tender, and two companies responded; GM and GE. Both companies were given contracts to produce a batch of thirteen locomotives which would be evaluated by the USATC; the vendor providing the better locomotive would then produce the rest of the required locomotives.

Both manufacturers delivered their sample batch in 1952, and after testing the GE locomotives, which were actually produced by Alco as a subcontractor, were declared the winner, and a further batch of 70 Alco MRS-1 locomotives were ordered. No more EMD locomotives were built.

As delivered, they were painted in gloss black with white numbering and lettering. They were numbered as 1808–1820 in US Army service.

=== Military service ===
The initial fate of most of the MRS-1 locomotives was to be placed in storage at the USATC's Transportation Materiel Command facility at Marietta, Pennsylvania awaiting a war to use them in; they had not been purchased for peacetime use. These brand-new locomotives, with at most a couple of weeks' actual use, sat preserved until approximately 1970, when the Pentagon concluded that their plans for a future, large-scale land war no longer included the capture and use of the enemy's railway system.

Thus the 96 locomotives were redundant for their original purpose. Many of the units were taken out of storage and assigned to various military installations around the country, where locomotives of that size and power were required. Five EMD MRS-1s were sent to the Naval Ammunition Depot in Hawthorne, Nevada (now the Hawthorne Army Depot), but were unsuccessful there and placed into storage.

==== Cold-weather testing ====
Unit #1820 was not placed into storage; instead, it was used initially for cold-weather testing. It was broken in on the Belt Railway of Chicago, and in November 1952 the locomotive was shipped to the Canadian National Railway for testing on the Hudson Bay Railway between The Pas and Churchill, Manitoba, where it became the first diesel locomotive to operate on that line. In May 1953, the locomotive returned to the BRC's shops in Chicago where it was stripped down and examined for abnormal wear from the cold weather, which was not found. The locomotive was then used at Fort Eustis for regular service and training.

Unit #1809 was also sent for cold-weather testing, in this case to the Alaska Railroad for a 3-year trial period. Shipped back in 1955, its engine was rebored to a larger size and slightly greater power output, then placed into storage. In 1969 it was reactivated and sent to the Vandenberg Air Force Base for service hauling supplies for the proposed Manned Orbiting Laboratory and components for Titan launch vehicles.

==== European testing ====
Locomotive #1818 was fitted with European buffers and couplers very soon after delivery and sent to Europe for Army testing and training and secondarily as an EMD demonstrator. It ran extensively on the Deutsche Bundesbahn (DB) and proved quite successful, although the DB preferred German-designed diesel-hydraulic locomotives. Subsequently, it tested on both SNCF (France) and NMBS/SNCB (Belgium), in the latter case successfully for GM-EMD since the NMBS/SNCB subsequently purchased EMD-licensed NOHAB locomotives.

=== Alaska Railroad ===
The 1952–1955 trial of #1809 was not the last appearance of an MRS-1 on Alaska Railroad metals. In 1977, the five MRS-1 locomotives that had been unsuccessfully transferred to the Navy were moved to Alaska to join thirteen of their Alco cousins.

=== Preserved survivors ===
Five of the thirteen EMD MRS-1 locomotives built survive in preservation. Of these, two (#1809 and #1820) are on display at the Pacific Southwest Railway Museum Association; #1811 is on display at the U.S. Army Transportation Museum at Fort Eustis, Virginia; #1813 was retired by the Heber Valley Historic Railroad and subsequently sold, and moved to Mount Pleasant, Utah to be used as part of a bed and breakfast; and #1818 is preserved at the Museum of Alaska Transportation and Industry in Wasilla, Alaska.

== Spotting features ==
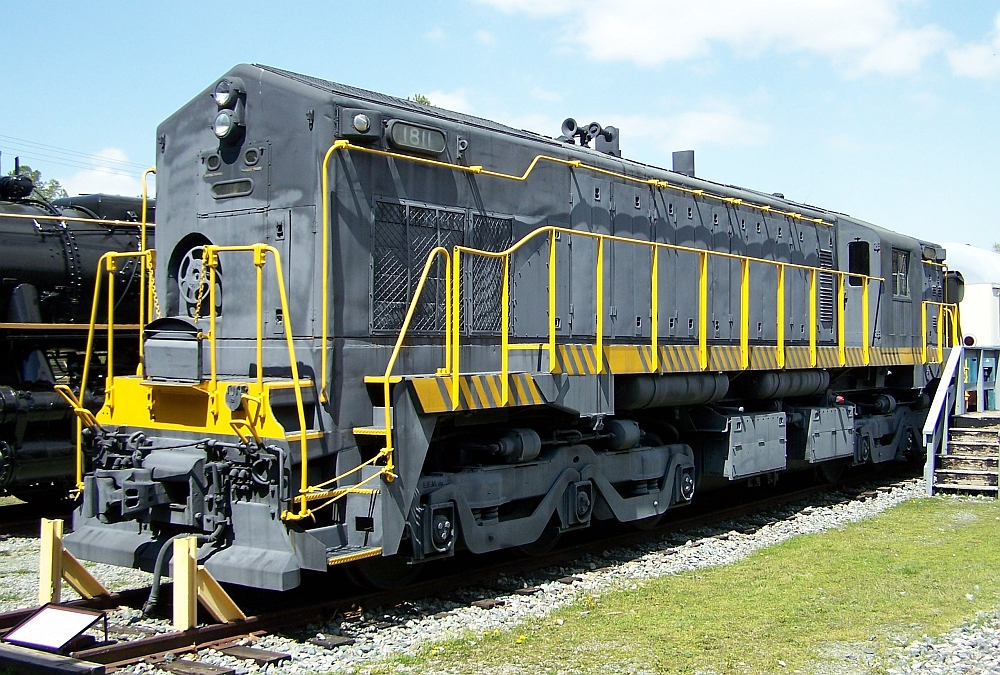
Front end of #1811, showing the shutterless grilles and peaked long hood of the EMD locomotives.

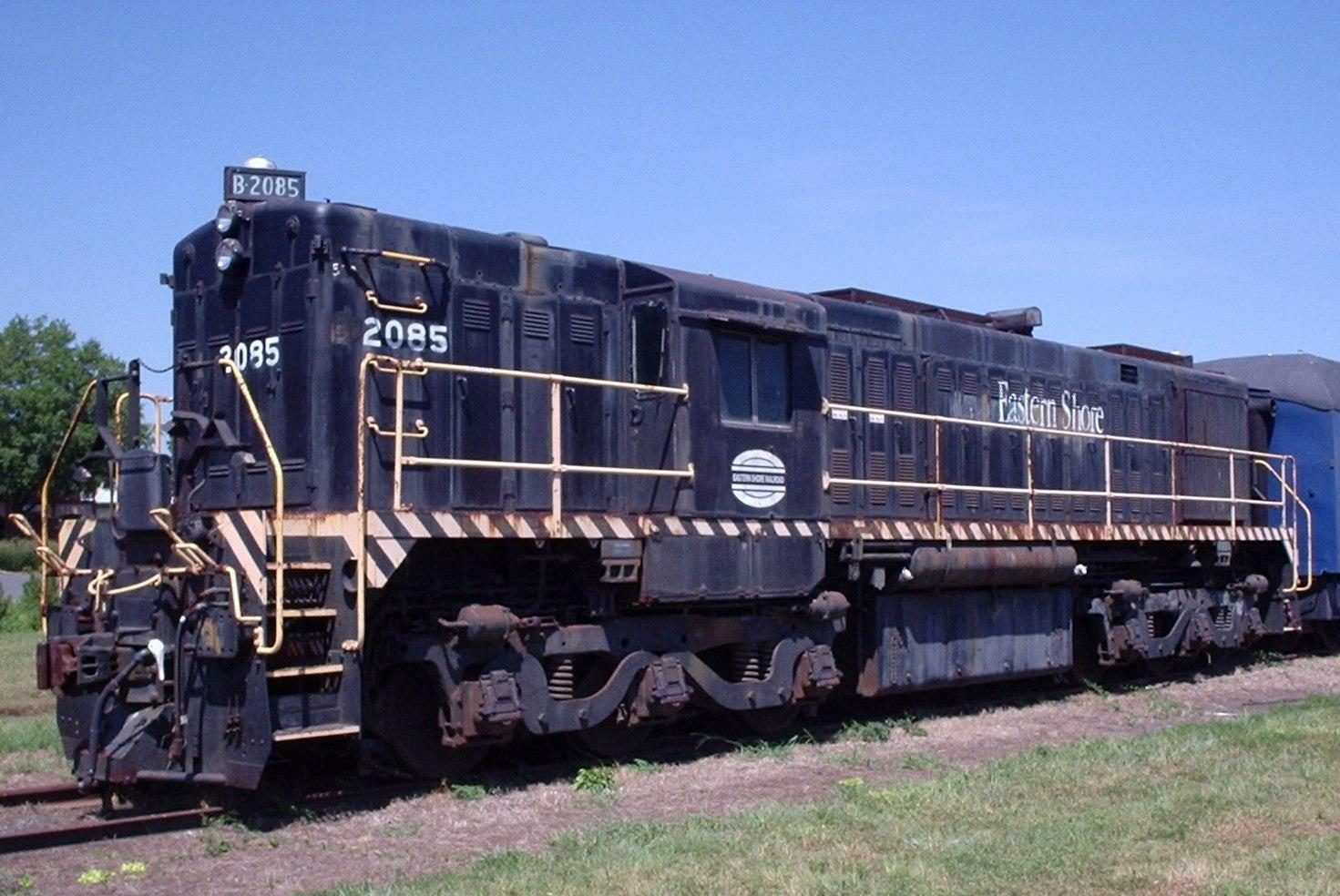
Back end of an Alco MRS-1, note much rounder cab.

Being produced to the same specification, both ALCO/GE and EMD MRS-1s are very similar in appearance and can easily be mistaken; they are both C-C road switcher locomotives that are very low in profile in order to fit within European loading gauges and structure gauges. The major exterior differences are the peaked cab roof and long hood roof on the EMD locomotives, and the radiator intakes on the sides of the long hood end, which have outside shutters on the Alco locomotives. In addition, the short hood is visibly lower than the long hood, thanks to the long hood's peaked roof; on the ALCO units, the two are the same height. The frame side sills are also different; the Alco's are straight from front to rear, while the EMD's step down towards each end of the locomotive.

== Naming ==
For a long while it was believed that "MRS-1" was an invented railfan name, since it did not appear to have been the official model name in documentation from the USATC or the manufacturers; it was thought to have been derived from "Military Railway Service", the USATC unit that operated them. However, Stefan Nicolaï has found that the designation "MRS-1" appears on the cover of EMD's operating manual for these locomotives, where it appears as "Military Road Switcher MRS-1".
