= ALCO MRS-1 =

Diesel locomotive class

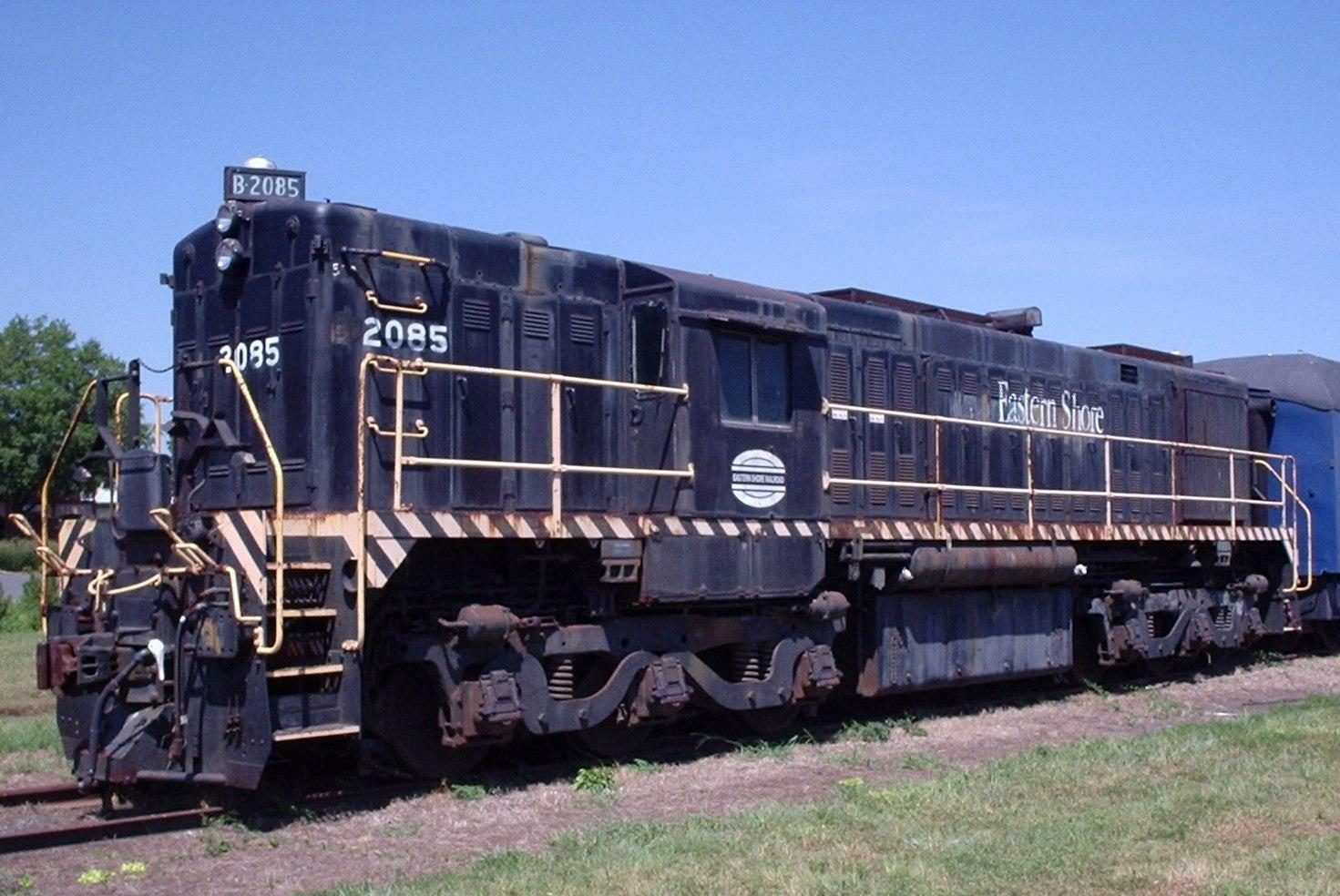
- US Army No. 2085, on the Bay Coast Railroad
Type and origin
- Power type: Diesel-electric
- Builder: ALCO
- Serial number: 80324-80406
- Model: RSX-4, Specification E-1670
- Build date: 1953-1954
- Total produced: 83
Specifications
- Configuration
  - AAR: C-C
- Gauge: multigauge, between 4 ft 8 1/2 in (1,435 mm) and 5 ft 6 in (1,676 mm) broad gauge
- Length: 55 ft 11 in (17.04 m)
- Loco weight: 240,000 lb (110,000 kg)
- Prime mover: ALCO 12-244D
- Engine type: Four-stroke diesel
- Displacement: 8,016 cu in (131.36 L)
- Generator: DC generator
- Traction motors: DC traction motors
- Cylinders: V12
- Cylinder size: 9 by 10 1/2 inches (229 mm × 267 mm)
- Transmission: Electric
- Loco brake: Straight air, Dynamic
- Train brakes: Air
Performance figures
- Maximum speed: 70 mph (110 km/h)
- Power output: 1,600 hp (1,200 kW)
- Tractive effort: 30,700 lbf (137,000 N) at 11 mph (18 km/h) (continuous)

The ALCO MRS-1 is a type of diesel-electric locomotive built by the American Locomotive Company for the United States Army Transportation Corps. They were built with multigauge trucks and to a reduced loading gauge for service anywhere in the world in the event of war.

== History ==
=== Development ===
The Korean War and the intensification of the Cold War at the beginning of the 1950s caused the Army Transportation Corps to consider what it might need for a new land war in Europe. They came up with a requirement for a locomotive capable of running on the existing tracks of a wide variety of railway systems. Key parts of the specification included adjustable-gauge trucks, compact bodywork to fit restrictive loading gauges, and replaceable couplers to fit a variety of systems. The trucks accepted wheelsets between standard gauge 4 ft 8 1/2 in (1,435 mm) and 5 ft 6 in (1,676 mm), which encompasses the vast majority of the broad gauges in use worldwide, including those of the then Soviet Union (1,520 mm (4 ft 11 27/32 in)) and the Iberian Peninsula (1,668 mm (5 ft 5 21/32 in)).

The specification was put out to tender, and two companies responded; GM and GE. Both companies were contracted produced a batch of thirteen locomotives which would be evaluated by the Army; the vendor providing the better locomotive would then produce the rest of the required locomotives.

Both manufacturers delivered their sample batch in 1952, and after testing the GE locomotives, which were actually produced by ALCO as a subcontractor, were declared the winner, and a further batch of 70 ALCO MRS-1 locomotives were ordered.

As delivered, they were painted in gloss black with white numbering and lettering. Fifty had steam generators for use in passenger service. The locomotives were numbered by the Army from 2041 to 2123.

=== Military service ===
The initial fate of most of the MRS-1 locomotives was to be placed in storage at the Army's Transportation Materiel Command facility at Marietta, Pennsylvania awaiting a war to use them in; they had not been purchased for peacetime use. These brand-new locomotives, with at most a couple of weeks' actual use, sat preserved until approximately 1970, when the Pentagon concluded that their plans for a future, large-scale land war no longer included the capture and use of the enemy's railway system.

Thus the 96 locomotives were redundant for their original purpose. Many of the units were taken out of storage and assigned to various military installations around the country, where locomotives of that size and power were required.

The Army eventually decided to transfer the units to the United States Navy. Five units stationed in Concord, California were the last to be used by the armed forces.

=== Post-military careers ===
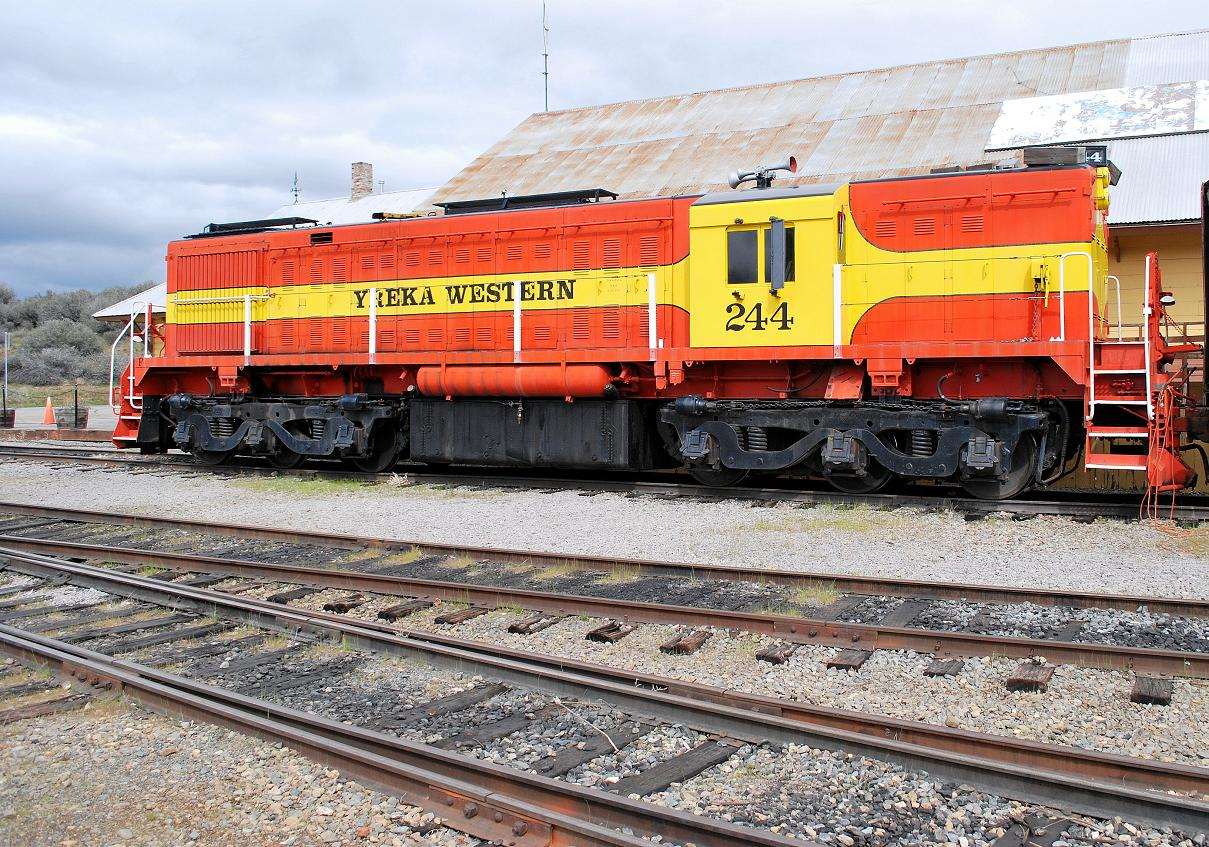
ALCO MRS-1 #244 (Yreka Western Railroad). The locomotive was scrapped in 2011.

Thirteen of the locomotives were sold to the Alaska Railroad—six in 1974, and seven in 1975. Alaska retired its last ALCO MRS-1s in 1984.

Two locomotives were sold to the Uruguayan Administración de Ferrocarriles del Estado, numbered 1611, 1612. One suffered a fire in 1994 and was scrapped while the other is stored inoperable.

While many locomotives were ultimately scrapped, several still exist, in various states of preservation. Examples exist at the Bluegrass Railroad and Museum, the Western Railway Museum, the Texas State Railroad, the National Museum of Transportation, the Northern Pacific Railway Museum, the Pacific Southwest Railway Museum, the Western Pacific Railroad Museum (one MRS-1 from the Western Pacific Railroad Museum was transferred to Yreka Western Railroad where it operated as YWRR #244, and later was scrapped in 2011), the California State Railroad Museum, and Railtown 1897.

In addition, the Eastern Shore Railroad (now Bay Coast Railroad) had stored two for possible future use, but they are now reported as scrapped in 2011. Cass Scenic Railroad also stored 2 examples, which were sold as surplus and later scrapped in 2010.

== Spotting features ==
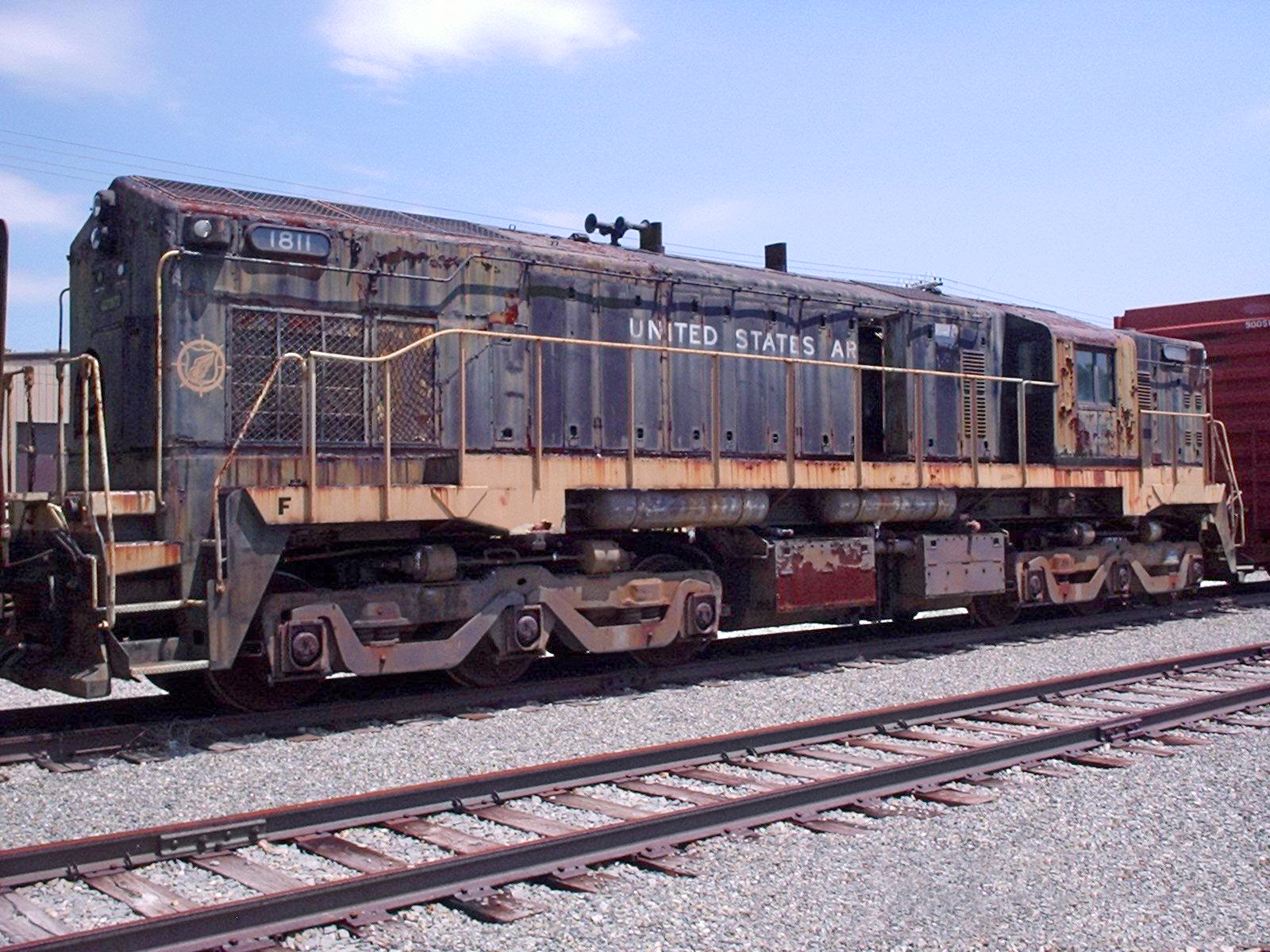
EMD MRS-1, showing shutterless grilles and a peaked long hood.

Being produced to the same specification, both GE/ALCO and EMD MRS-1s are very similar in appearance and can easily be mistaken; they are both C-C road switcher locomotives that are very low in profile in order to fit within European loading gauges. The major exterior differences are the peaked cab roof and long hood roof on the EMD locomotives, and the radiator intakes on the sides of the long hood end, which have outside shutters on the ALCO locomotives. In addition, the short hood is visibly lower than the long hood, thanks to the long hood's peaked roof; on the ALCO units, the two are the same height. The frame side sills are also different; the ALCO's are straight from front to rear, while the EMD's step down towards each end of the locomotive.

== See also ==
- List of ALCO diesel locomotives
