= EMD GP16 =

Model of rebuilt diesel-electric locomotive

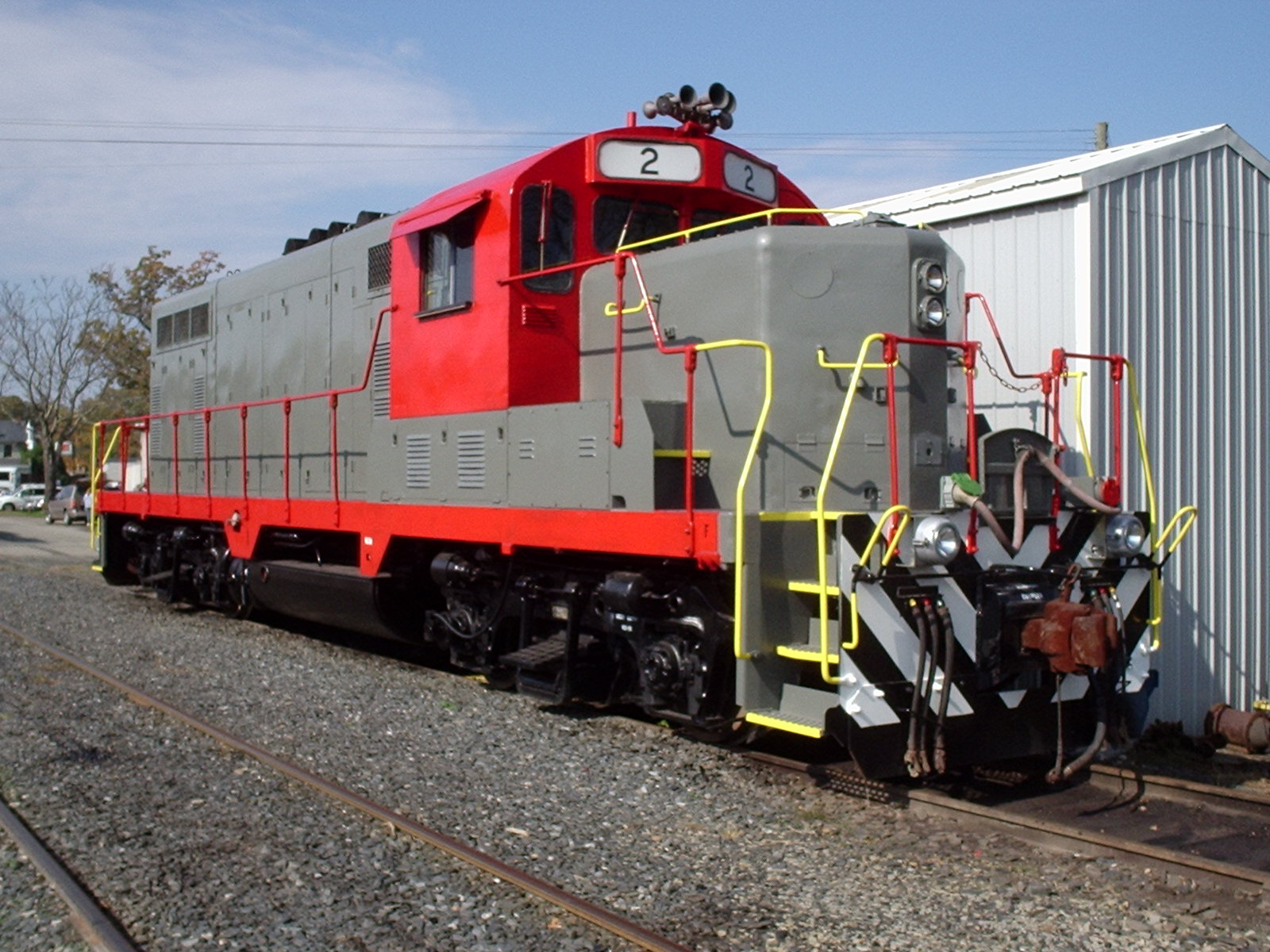
- Buckingham Branch Railroad No. 2, a GP16 rebuild, rests at Dillwyn, Virginia
Type and origin
- Power type: Diesel-electric
- Builder: General Motors Electro-Motive Division (EMD); rebuilt by the Seaboard Coast Line Railroad
- Model: GP16
- Build date: June 1979 — November 1982
- Total produced: 155
Specifications
- Configuration
  - AAR: B-B
- Gauge: 4 ft 8 1/2 in (1,435 mm)
- Length: 56 ft 0 in (17.07 m)
- Width: 10 ft 0 in (3.05 m)
- Loco weight: 258,000 lb (117,000 kg)
- Prime mover: EMD 16-645
- Engine type: 2-stroke diesel
- Traction motors: 4 DC
- Transmission: Diesel-electric
- Loco brake: straight air
- Train brakes: 26L air
Performance figures
- Maximum speed: 65 mph (105 km/h)
- Power output: 1,600 hp (1,200 kW)
- Tractive effort: 64,500 lbf (287 kN)
Career
- Locale: North America

The EMD GP16 is a series of rebuilt diesel-electric locomotives, a result of a remanufacturing program initiated by the Seaboard Coast Line Railroad (SCL) in an effort to spare the cost of purchasing new motive power in the late 1970s. This involved the rebuilding of their aging fleet of EMD GP7, GP9 and GP18 road switchers (many of which were over twenty years old). 155 locomotives (122 GP7, 31 GP9 and two GP18) were rebuilt by the SCL.

== The program ==
155 locomotives were rebuilt by the Seaboard Coast Line. The vast majority of them came from Atlantic Coast Line, Seaboard Air Line and their subsidiaries (Atlanta and West Point Railroad, Charleston and Western Carolina Railway, Georgia Railroad, Western Railway of Alabama, Winston-Salem Southbound Railway); eight units came from Clinchfield Railroad (with one of them ex Nashville, Chattanooga and St. Louis Railway), not counting the six units rebuilt at Paducah; seven units came from the Louisville and Nashville Railroad (including four ex-Chicago and Eastern Illinois Railroad units).

The required modifications took nine weeks per unit on average to complete. The rebuild work was done at the railroad's Uceta Shops near Tampa, Florida, with the engines, bogies and traction motors rebuilt at Waycross and Jacksonville. The program resulted in a cost savings of almost 50% over buying new locomotives.

Included in the program:

- Rebuilding the underframe assembly;
- Remanufacturing the Blomberg B two-axle trucks, generators, and traction motors (all GP16s were configured with a B-B wheel arrangement);
- Upgrading the 567 prime mover with EMD 645 series components, which boosted the horsepower rating to 1,600 in the case of the former GP7 locomotives. This gave rise to the 16 designation.
- Removal of the dynamic brakes, and installation of a new type 26L air brake system.
- Installation of a new high-voltage cabinet.
- Lowering the front nose of the carbody to improve visibility, and retrofitting with a new cab and standard AAR control stand.

Ancillary benefits included a lowered engine idling speed and increased fuel efficiency. SCL committed over 100 of its personnel to the conversion program. The first GP16 emerged from SCL's Uceta (Tampa) shop in June 1979 while the last was placed into service during November 1982.

== In service ==
The rebuilt locomotives saw service throughout the system, engaging in a variety of duties from local switching to main-line freight hauling. Though SCL became part of CSX in the 1980s, the majority of the units remained active until 1992, when the bulk of the roster was retired and sold-off. Many GP16s remain in active service today on short line railroads around the country, far exceeding their 15-year projected lifespan.

In 1993, the United States Army bought a small number of GP16s from CSX, which led some people to think the Army built it. The locomotives were sent to Conrail's Juniata Locomotive Shops to be remanufactured under contract with the Army. When they were completed, Conrail put a GP9M plate on them. These locomotives are controlled by Woodward PGR type diesel engine governors.

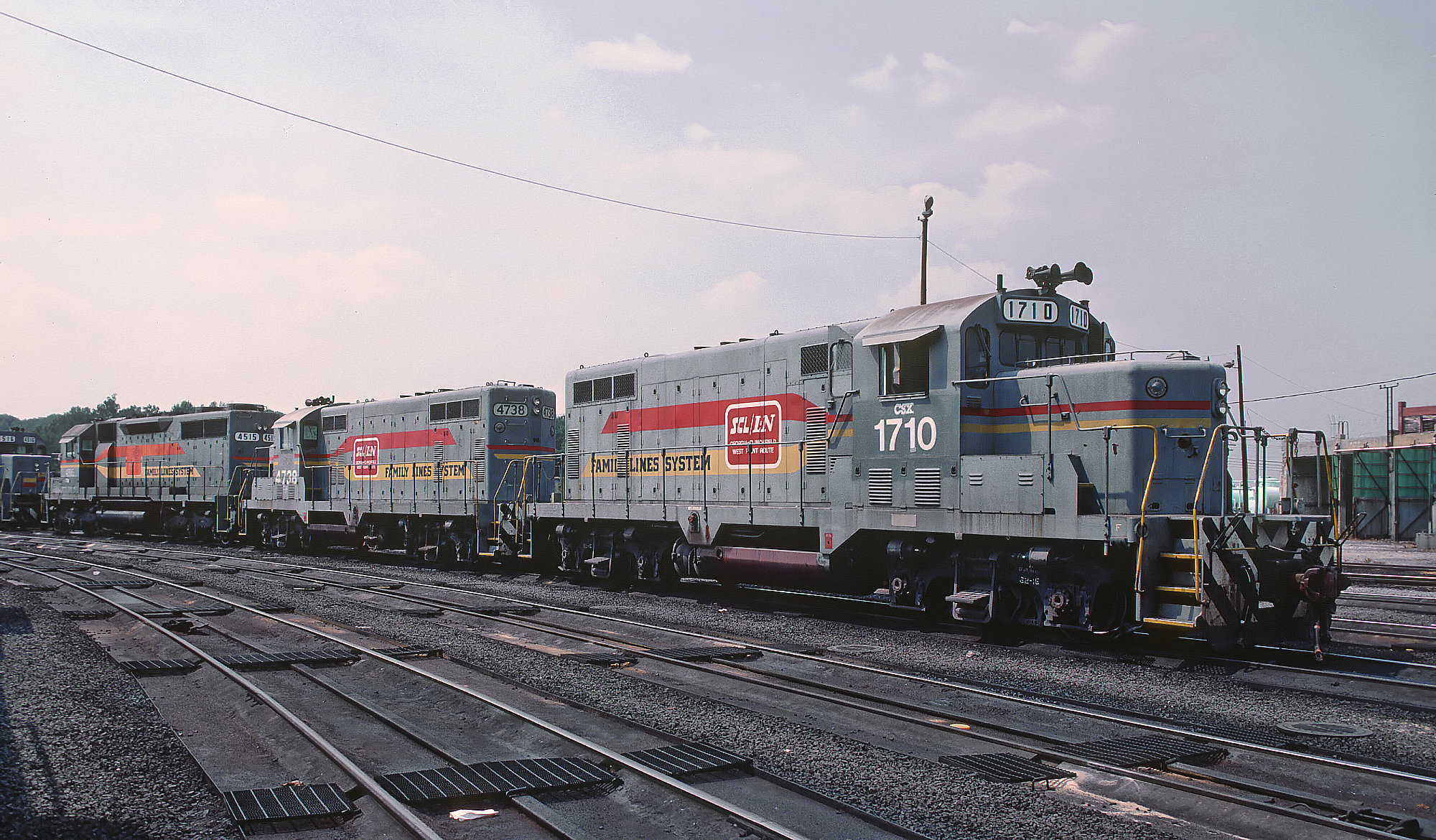
Two CSX, ex-SCL GP16s, still in Family Lines System livery

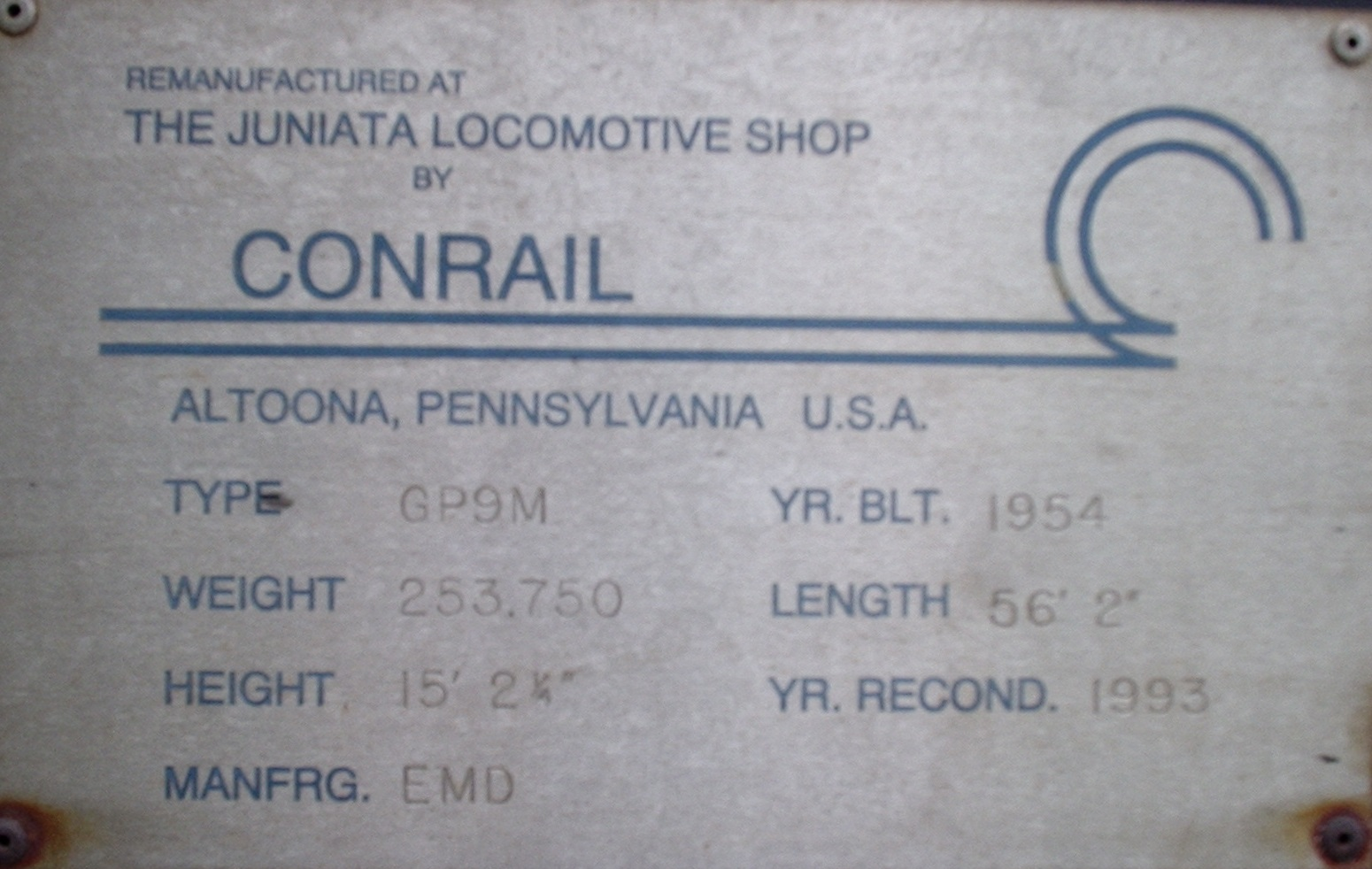
A plate Conrail on USAX 4635, a GP16 at Fort Eustis, Virginia, when remanufactured in 1993

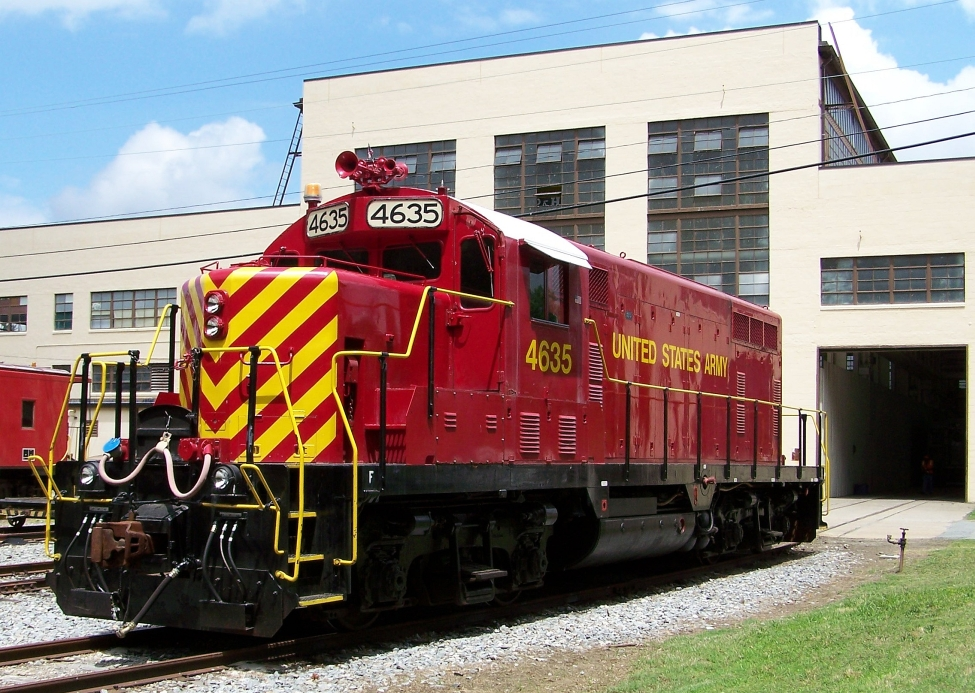
CSX sold many GP16s to the United States Army and today #4635 serves at Fort Eustis

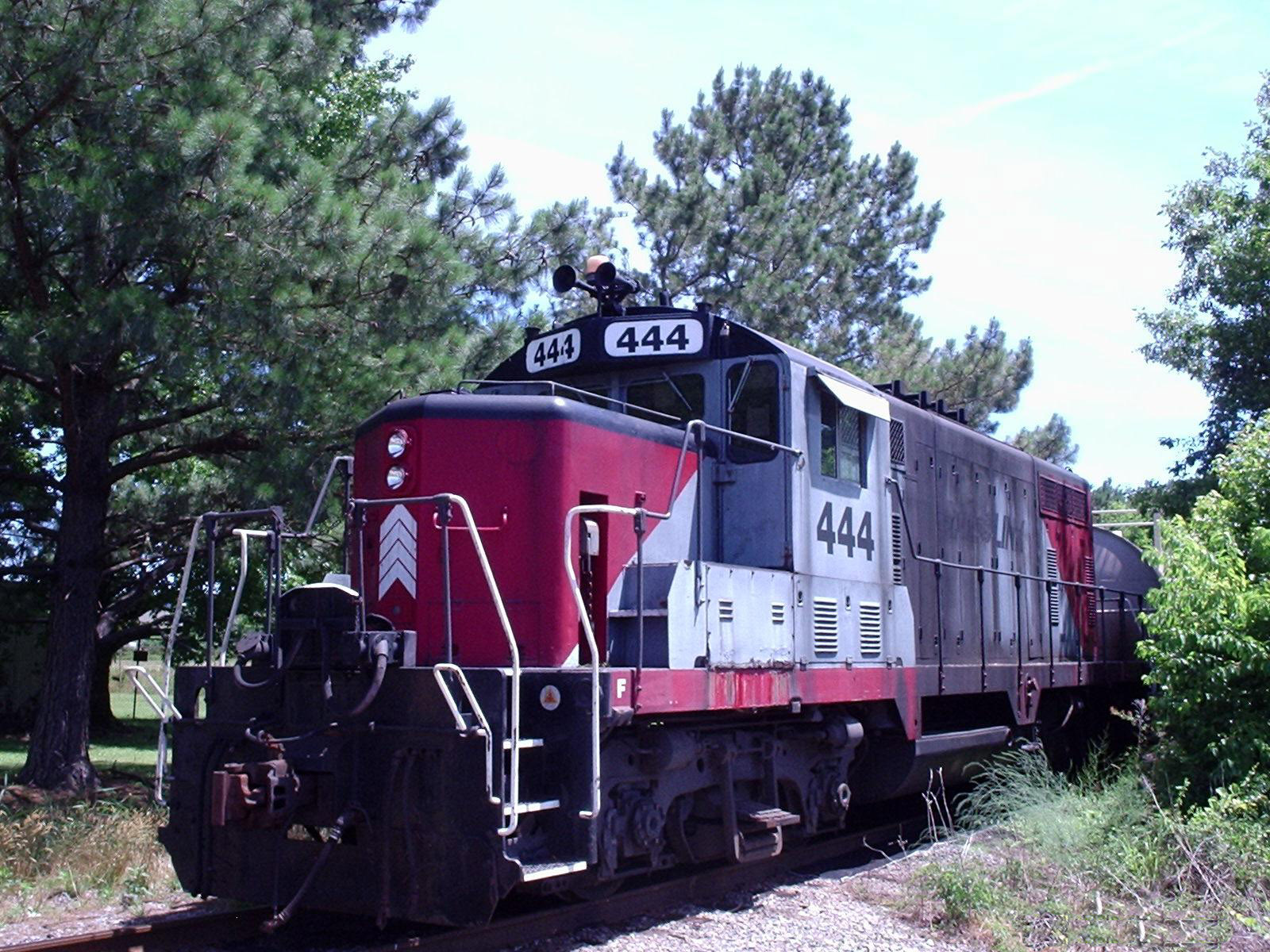
Rail Link No. 444, a GP16 rebuild, works on the Commonwealth Railway in Suffolk, Virginia

== Other units called GP16 ==
- In the late 1960s through the early 1970s, the Missouri Pacific repowered their entire roster of high-hood ALCO RS-11s with EMD 567 series diesel engines. These converted units were designated by the MP as "GP16s" presumably to reflect their new horsepower rating.
- Clinchfield Railroad had six GP7s rebuilt by ICG Paducah and they were called GP16s, but built to the same standard as ICG GP11s. When the CSX merger occurred these engines were grouped as GP16s. Two notable features were the angled cab and air intake filters.

== See also ==
- List of GM-EMD locomotives
