= U.S. Army Transportation Museum =

Coordinates: 37.1650°N 76.5756°W

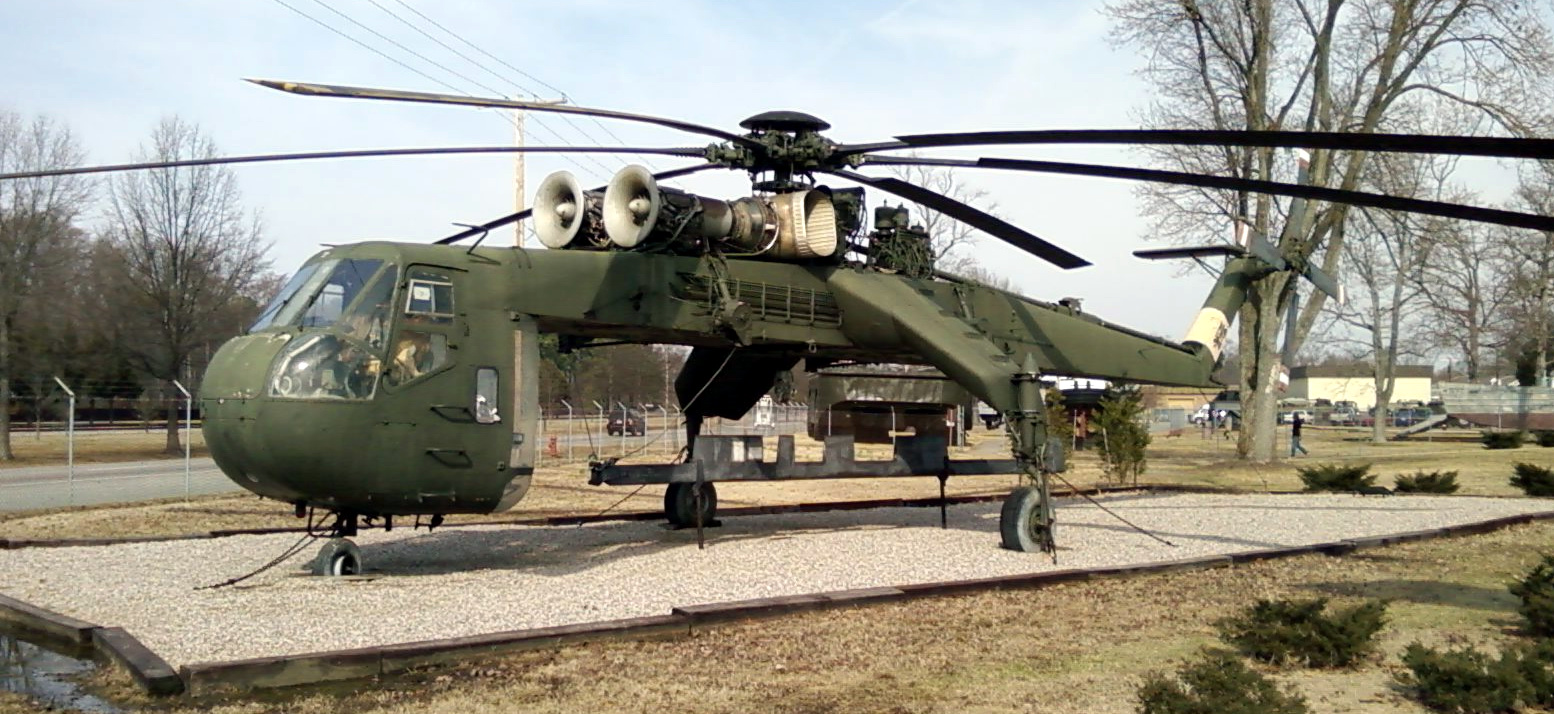
- Sikorsky CH-54 Tarhe outside the museum

- Location within Virginia
- Established: 1959
- Location: Fort Eustis, Virginia
- Type: Military Museum
- Visitors: 50,000
- Director: Alisha Hamel
- Website: Official website

The U.S. Army Transportation Museum is a United States Army museum of vehicles and other transportation-related equipment and memorabilia. It is located on the grounds of Fort Eustis, Virginia, in Newport News, on the Virginia Peninsula.

== History ==
The museum was established in 1959, in a warehouse using items initially collected for a recruiting exhibit. A main building opened in 1976, and in 1987, an open-air pavilion was opened for aviation exhibits. The buildings, built at a total cost of US$765,000, and other capital improvements are funded by the Army Transportation Museum Foundation (ATMF). Since the foundation is prohibited by law from obtaining state or federal grants, private donations are the only funding source.

A number of the museum's artifacts, including a CH-54 were moved to Fort Lee in 2021. In June 2025, it was announced that the museum will close within the next three years and be consolidated with a logistics museum at Fort Lee near Richmond, Virginia.

== Mission ==
The museum reflects the history of the Army, especially of the United States Army Transportation Corps, and includes close to 100 military vehicles such as aircraft, wheeled vehicles, watercraft and rolling stock, including stock from the Fort Eustis Military Railroad. It is officially dedicated to General Frank S. Besson, Jr., who was the first four-star general to lead the transportation command, and extends over 6 acres (2.4 ha) of land, air and sea vehicles and indoor exhibits. The exhibits cover transportation and its role in US Army operations, including topic areas from the American Revolutionary War through operations in Afghanistan.

== Exhibits ==
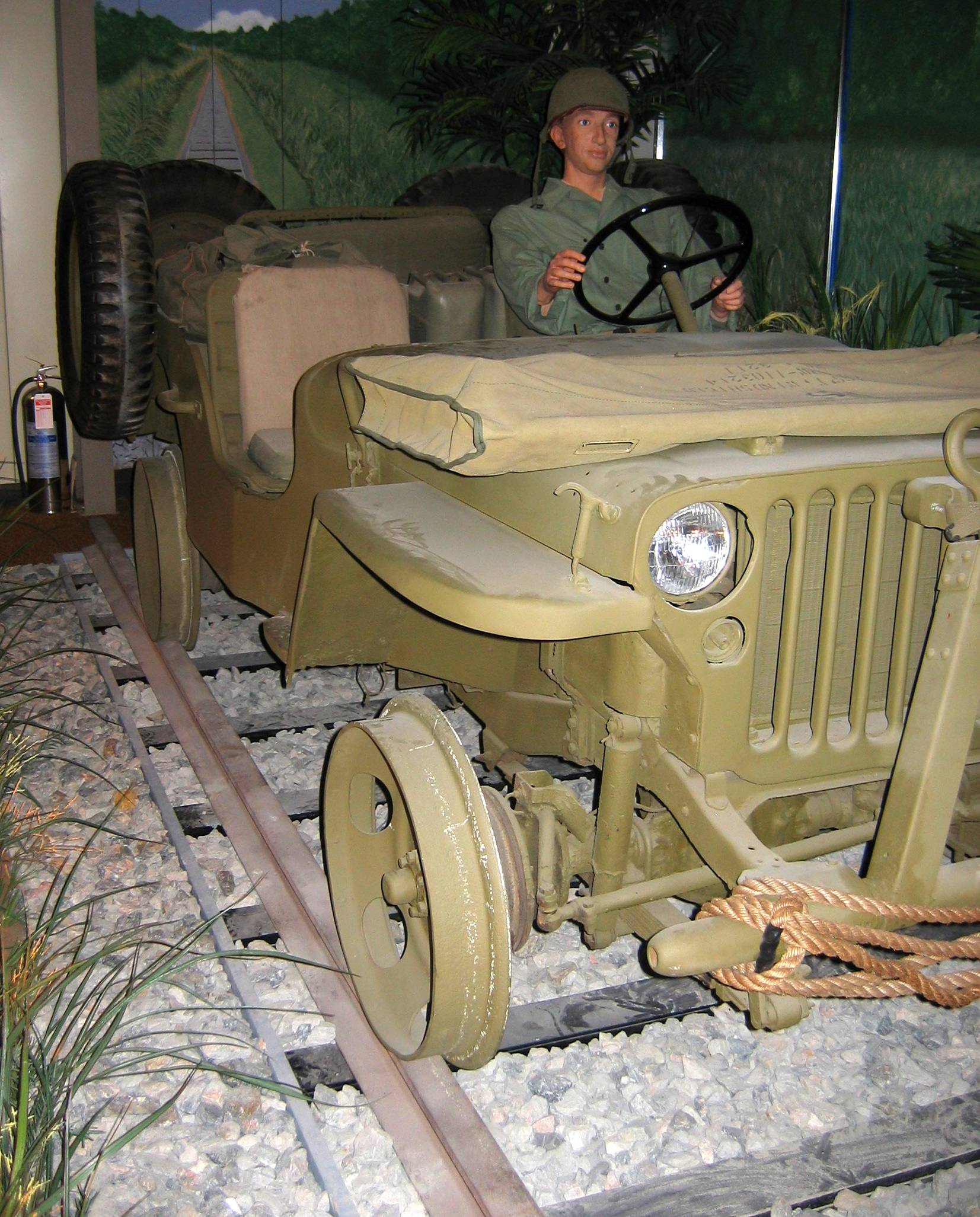
A rail jeep diorama at the museum

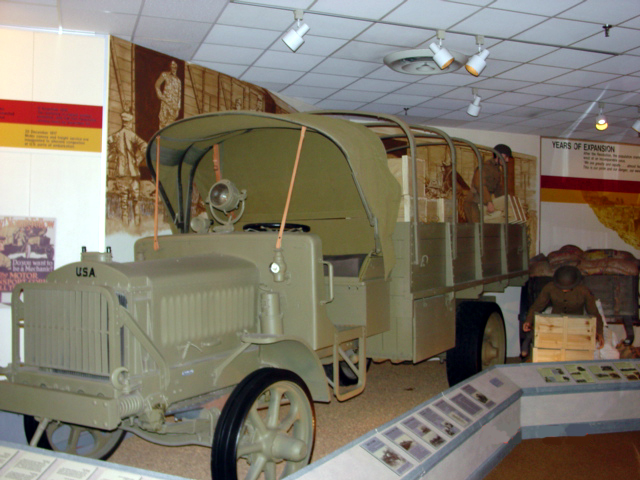
A "Liberty truck", the first standardized US army truck

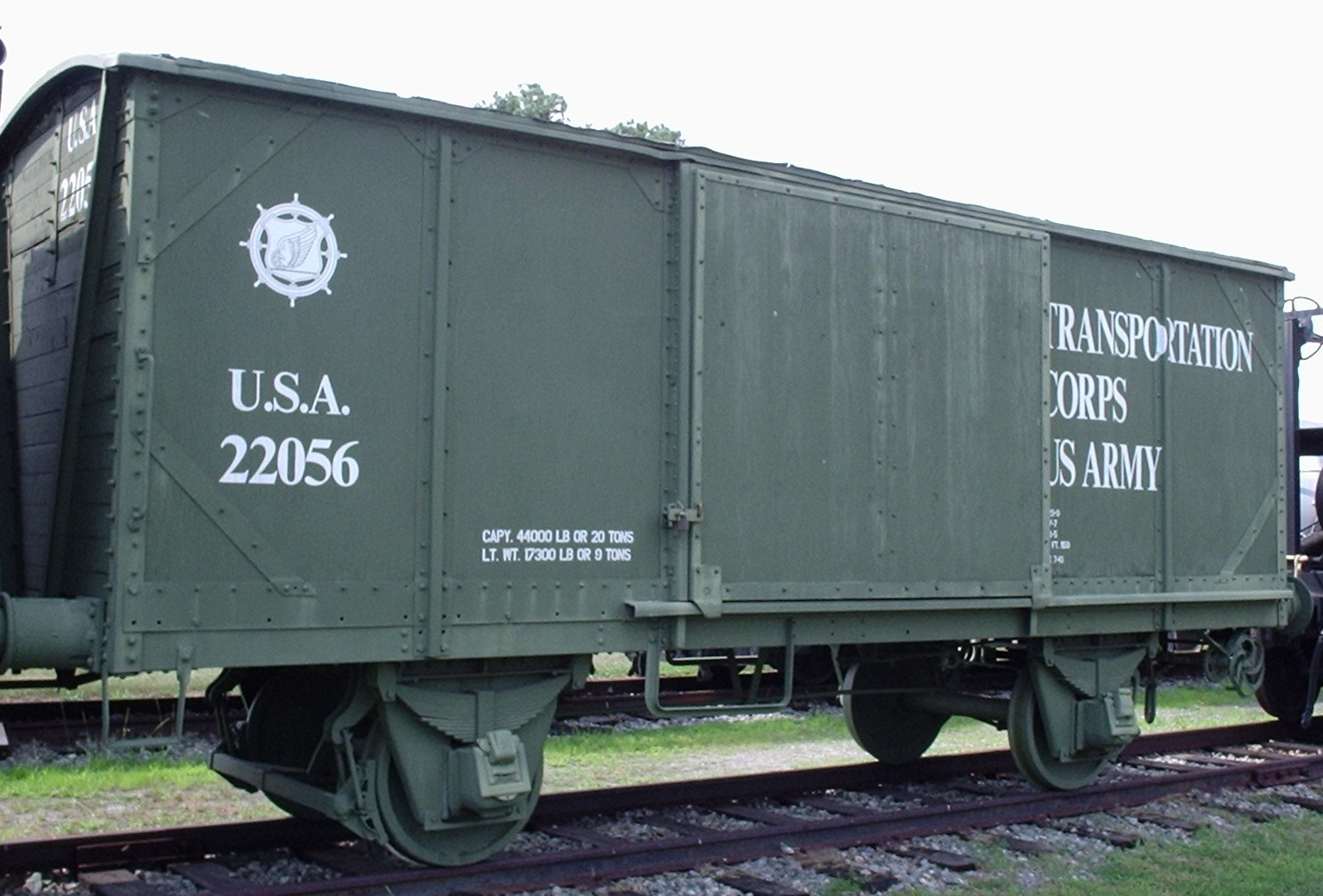
Forty-and-eights style boxcar in the museum

The museum features a 50,000-square-foot (4,600 m^{2}) main building and four outdoor parks. The exhibits inside the museum building include representative transportation-related materials, presented in a series of dioramas in chronological order. Outside (see map, below) there is a vehicle yard to the south, with road vehicles, amphibious craft, and the aircraft pavilion, and a rail exhibit to the north. Although material is presented on 18th- and 19th-century topics, over half the indoor exhibit space and almost all of the outdoor exhibits are 20th-century- related.

Early truck developments are given coverage with the Mexican Punitive Expedition, Liberty truck, and Transcontinental Motor Convoy exhibits. The extensive Liberty Truck exhibit covers the development and production of the Army's first standardized truck design, a 5-ton cargo hauler produced using interchangeable parts. Also included are letters from soldiers about their experiences with the trucks.

World War II receives coverage with several exhibits including Operation Mulberry which was an operation to construct two artificial harbors on the Normandy coast to support the invasion. This operation used 158 tugboats including 74 of the Army's "small tugs" to tow 59 Gooseberry derelict ships to be sunk as breakwalls and the Phoenix caissons and Lobnitz floating piers. Another exhibit focuses on the Red Ball Express, the massive supply operation that supported Patton's advance after D-Day. The exhibit includes photos and paintings of the trucks as well as a diorama of a rest stop/repair depot featuring cargo trucks and a wrecker. Additional materials address the massive fuel and oil consumption needs as well as soldier experiences.

The museum has an extensive Vietnam War exhibit, including a large diorama with the gun truck Eve of Destruction (believed the only surviving Vietnam era gun truck, and named after a protest song), an exhibit depicting a downed UH-1 Iroquois in a rice paddy, as well as bicycles used by the Viet Cong. The museum has an extensive collection of gun truck images, organised by the truck name, which are also on the museum's web site.

Outdoor exhibits include the vehicle park with a selection of representative vehicles used in the transport command including a DUKW. A marine park has Army water vessels such as a tugboat, J-Boat, and various sized amphibious craft including landing craft and wheeled barges.

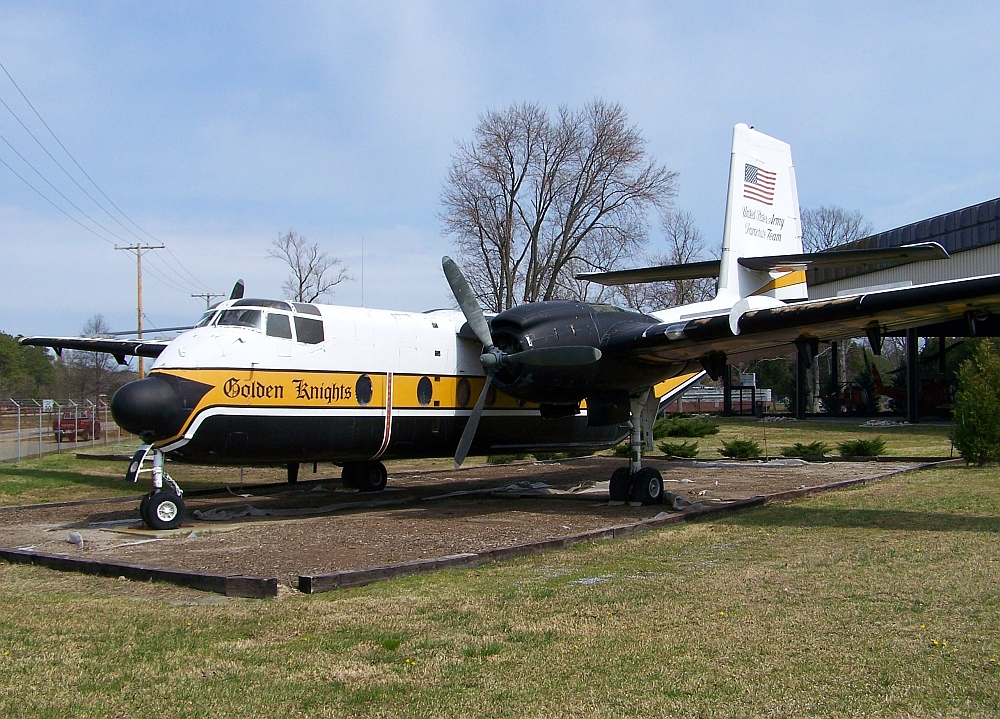
A C-7 Caribou

The aviation pavilion exhibits aircraft, fixed wing and helicopter, from the Korean War to the present, including a HZ-1 Aerocycle, an OH-23 Raven helicopter and a vertical take-off/landing plane. An unrestored Avrocar is kept in storage.

The rail section has several significant artifacts including the railway cars used in the Berlin duty train as well as standard issue tank switchers, and a collection of typical rolling stock including cranes, freight cars and maintenance of way equipment.

== Visiting ==
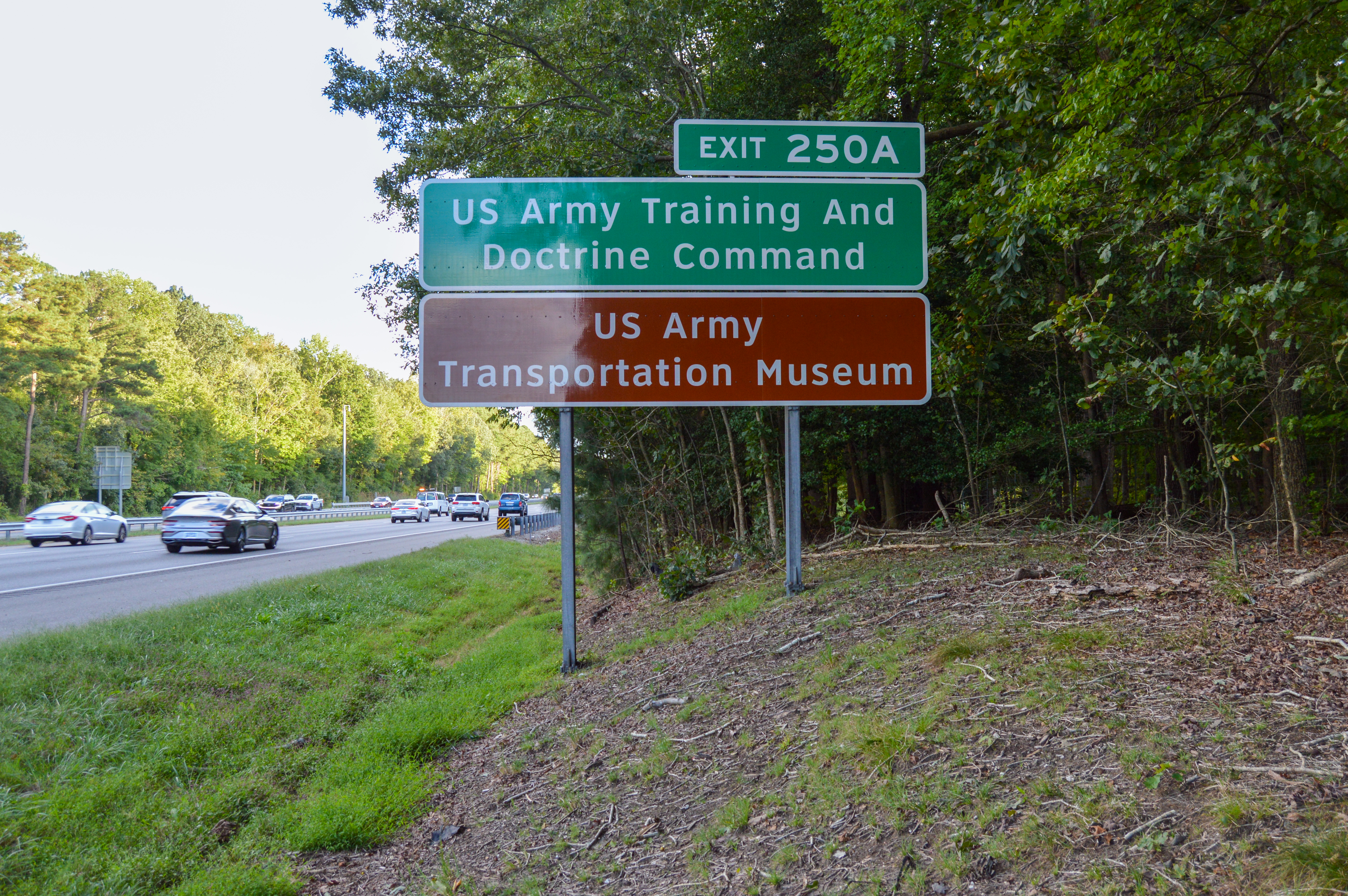
Road sign on Interstate 64 advertising the US Army Transportation Museum, along with the now deactivated United States Army Training and Doctrine Command.

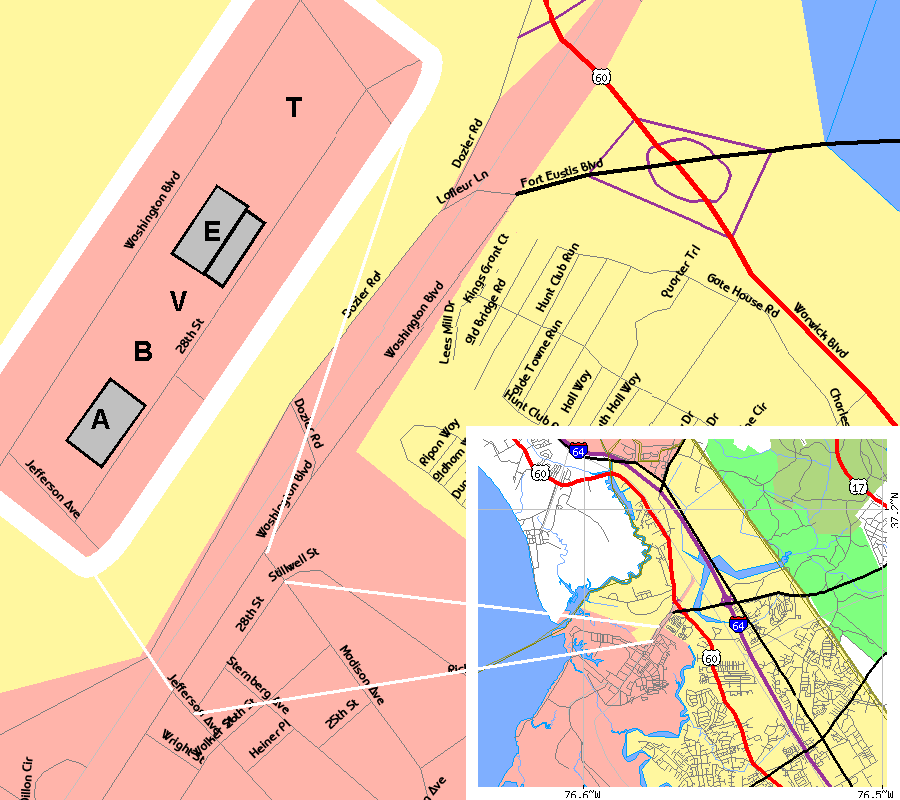
Map Key A - Aviation Pavilion and exhibits B - Boats and amphibious transport exhibits V - Vehicle Park E - Indoor exhibits and dioramas T - Train/Railway exhibits

Since the museum is on an active military installation, a check-in at the guard station, a possible vehicle search, and a visitor's pass are required (driver's license, car insurance and car registration, citizens of other nations need their passport). The museum has a gift shop, and a reference library where research may be undertaken with advance request.
