= Transportation Materiel Command =

The Transportation Materiel Command (TMC) was a unit of the US Army, originally headquartered in Marietta, Pennsylvania. In March 1955, it merged with the Transportation Corps Army Aviation Field Service Office (TCAAFSO) to form the Transportation Supply and Maintenance Command (TSMC) headquartered in St. Louis, Missouri; on 1 October 1959, the TSMC was redesignated back to being the Transportation Materiel Command. It became the Aviation and Surface Materiel Command on 1 November 1962.
