= List of parks in Newport News, Virginia =

Municipal parks in Virginia

This is a list of municipal parks located in Newport News, Virginia under the authority of the Newport News Department of Parks, Recreation and Tourism.

- 29th & Oak Minipark
- 29th & Terminal Minipark
- 47th/Warwick Minipark
- Beechlake Park
- Boulevard Park
- Christopher Newport Park
- Causey's Mill Historic Park
- Deer Park
- Denbigh Park Boat Ramp
- Endview Plantation
- Highland Court
- Hilton Pier/Ravine
- Huntington Heights
- Huntington Park
- Ivy Farms Park
- JAMA Square
- King-Lincoln Park
- Mariners' Lake Natural Area
- Lee Hall Plantation
- Lee's Mill
- Municipal Lane Park
- Newport News Park
- Nicewood Park
- Potter's Field
- Queen's Hithe
- Riverview Farm Park
- Skiffe's Creek Park / Redoubt (planned)
- Stoney Run Park
- Superblock
- Tear Drop Park
- Young's Mill
