= Boulevard Park =

Boulevard Park may refer to the following places in the United States:

- Boulevard Park, Sacramento, California, a neighborhood
- Boulevard Park (Worcester, Massachusetts), a former baseball park
- Boulevard Park, a former baseball park in Detroit, Michigan
- Boulevard Park (Newport News, Virginia), a park in Newport News, Virginia
- Boulevard Park, Washington, a census-designated place
- Boulevard Park, a park in Bellingham, Washington
