= Warwick Line =

The Warwick Line (also known as the Warwick–Yorktown line) was a defensive works across the Virginia Peninsula maintained along the Warwick River by Confederate General John B. Magruder against much larger Union forces under General George B. McClellan during the American Civil War in 1861–62.

The main line extended 12 miles from Yorktown to the Warwick River and downstream to Lee's Mill, then westward to Skiffe's Creek, which flowed into the James River at Mulberry Island, where the line was anchored on the east by a four-gun battery at Mulberry Island Point. The south end of Mulberry Island (now part of Fort Eustis) is located at the confluence of the Warwick and James Rivers.

To make the river a barrier, the Confederates added three dams along the Warwick; two older grist-mill dams already stood at Lee's Mill and Wynne's Mill.

Union forces under McClellan reached the line in early April 1862. An attempt to outflank it at Lee's Mill on April 5 failed, and McClellan chose to besiege the position rather than assault it. On April 16, Union infantry probed the line at Dam No. 1 and were pushed back; the Confederate forces were by then under General Joseph E. Johnston. Before the Union bombardment planned for early May could begin, Johnston withdrew from the Yorktown defenses toward Williamsburg, where the Battle of Williamsburg was fought on May 5.

== See also ==
- Dam No. One Battlefield Site
- Fort Crafford
- Lee's Mill Earthworks
- Queen Hith Plantation Complex Site
- Southern Terminal Redoubt
