= Fort Crafford =

Archaeological site in Virginia, United States

- U.S. National Register of Historic Places
- Virginia Landmarks Register
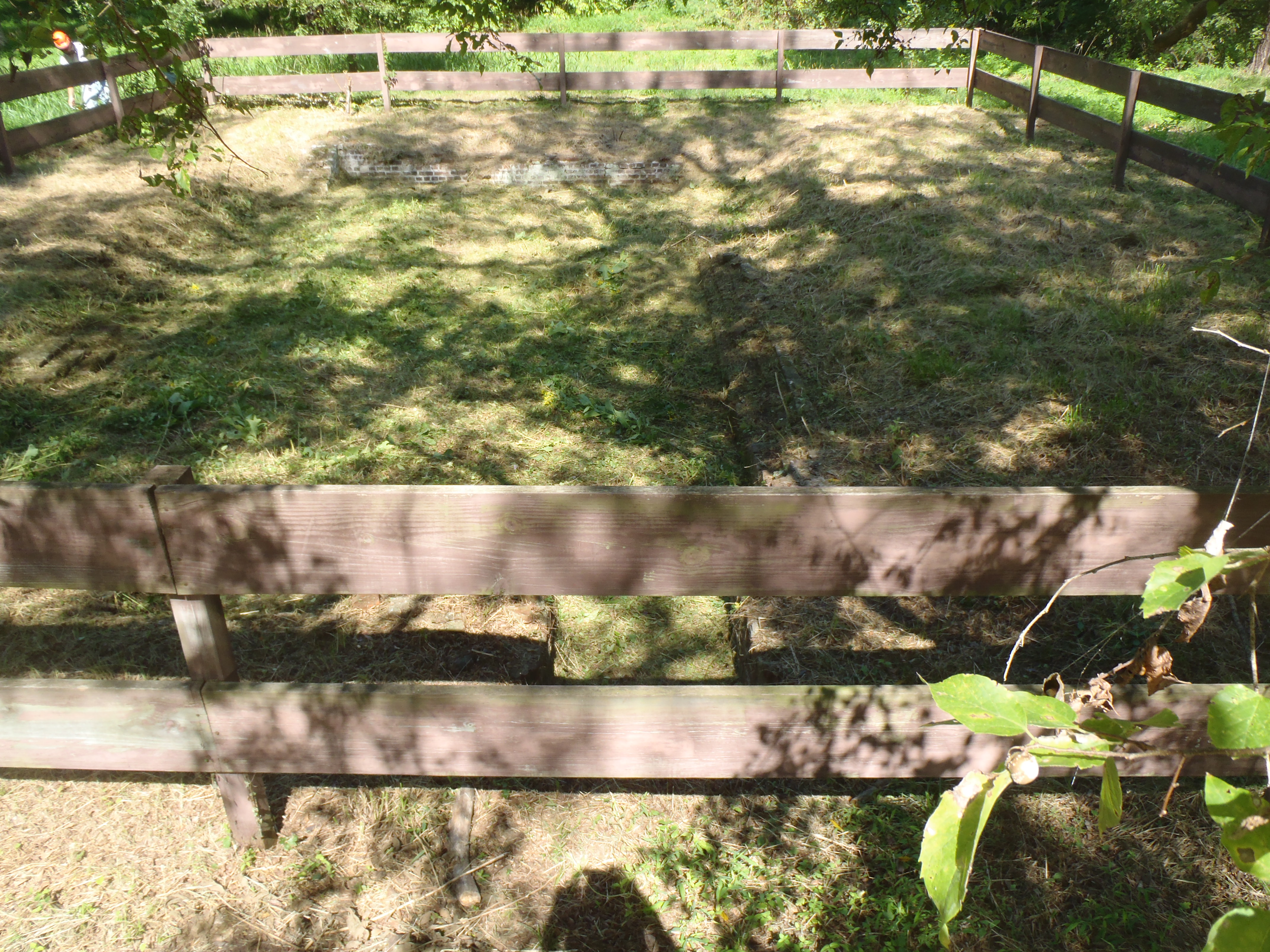
- Foundation of the Crafford house

- Location within Virginia Location within the United States
- Location: Fort Eustis Military Reservation on Mulberry Island Point, Newport News, Virginia
- Coordinates: 37°7′42″N 76°37′5″W
- Area: 9.5 acres (3.8 ha)
- Built: 1861
- NRHP reference No.: 74002237
- VLR No.: 121-0027

Significant dates
- Added to NRHP: May 17, 1974
- Designated VLR: October 16, 1973

Fort Crafford is a historic archaeological site located at Fort Eustis, Newport News, Virginia. It is a pentagonal-shaped earthwork located on Mulberry Island and built by Confederate forces in 1862. The earthworks on Mulberry Island are considered part of the Warwick Line. The purpose of these works was to prevent the Union from flanking the line on the James River. The fort formed the James River terminus of the second trans-peninsula defensive line, which included fortifications at Lee's Mill, as well as Dam No.1 and Wynne's Mill in Newport News Park.

Mulberry Point Battery, a water battery, guarded the Swash Channel along the James River. This battery was a complement to Fort Huger on the south side of the river. In February 1862 a pentagonal earthwork enclosing approximately eight acres was constructed inland from the Mulberry Point Battery to protect the battery from overland attack and to be a refuge for soldiers if the Minor Farm Line (a short rifle line constructed to defend the rear of the battery) was overrun. The fort was called the "covering work at Mulberry Island," or Mulberry Island Fort; later it became known as Fort Crafford after the owners of the land where it was built. Construction was overseen by Pvt. James P. Hopkins of the Warwick Beauregards, who was noted as illiterate but possessing uncanny abilities in design, clearing land, and construction. This fort was not intended to be part of the main Warwick Line, but was separated from it by about half a mile so that troops could withdraw from the line into the fort if necessary. Confederate forces withdrew from Mulberry Island in May 1862 to move closer to Richmond, so Fort Crafford never saw combat.

The foundation of the Crafford house located within the earthwork was excavated in the 1970s by amateur archaeologists of the Fort Eustis Historical and Archaeological Association. The brick and oyster-shell mortar foundation of the house remains, surrounded by a protective fence.

In 1998, archaeologists from the Colonial Williamsburg Department of Archaeological Research conducted investigations into a seventeenth-century occupation of the area within the Civil War fortification. Three areas of seventeenth-century domestic activity were identified.

Fort Crafford was listed on the National Register of Historic Places in 1974.
