= Southern Terminal =

Southern Terminal may refer to:

- Southern Terminal (Knoxville, Tennessee)
- Southern Terminal, Susquehanna and Tidewater Canal
- Southern Terminal Redoubt

== See also ==
- Glasgow Southern Terminal Railway Act 1846
- South Terminal, 2019 French film
