= Riverview Farm Park =

Municipal park in Newport News, Virginia

Coordinates: 37°5′29.4″N 76°31′48.1″W

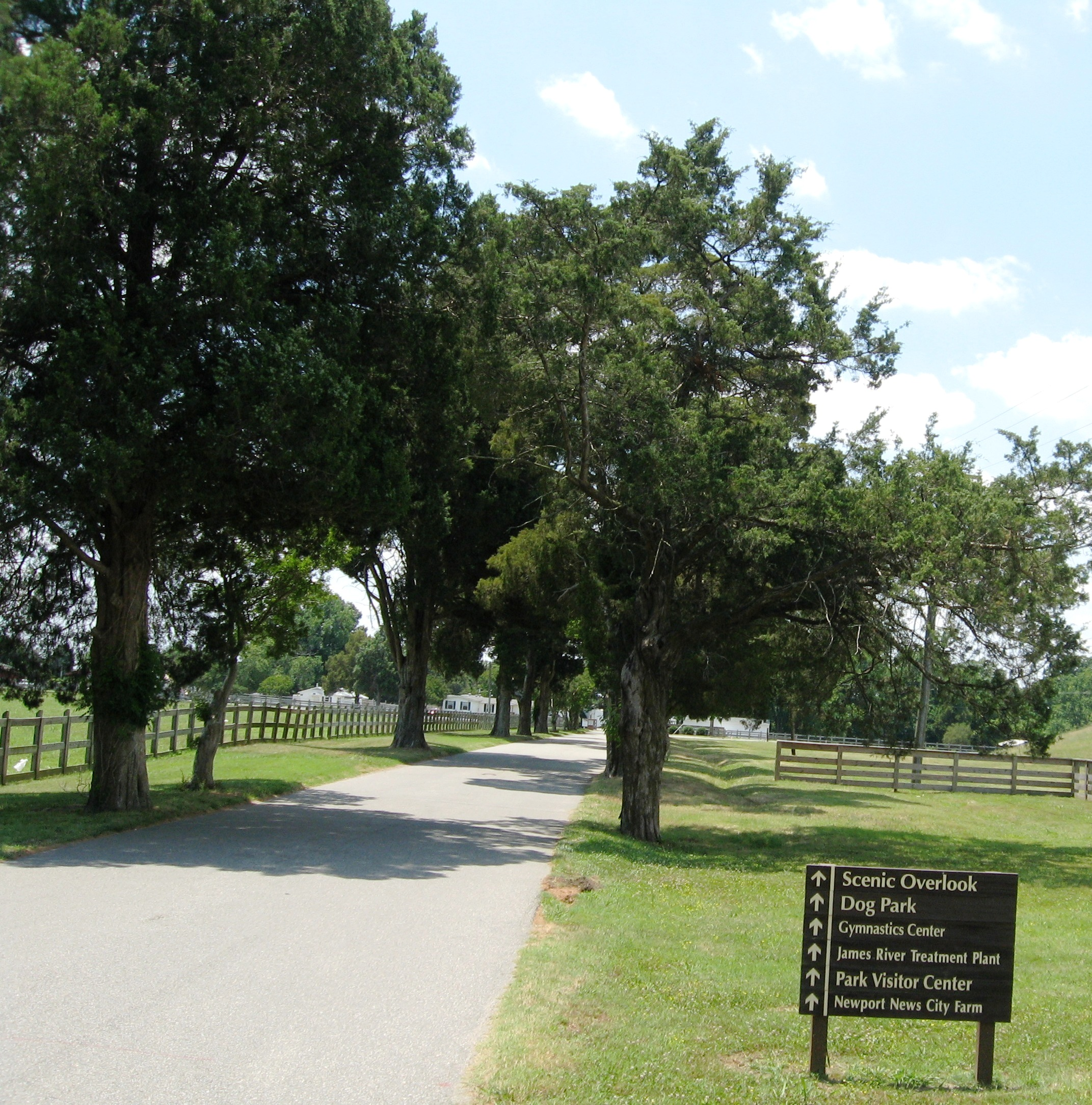
Riverview Farm Park

Riverview Farm Park is a municipal park located in Newport News, Virginia. It is run by the Newport News Department of Parks, Recreation and Tourism.

== Location ==
Riverview Farm Park is located on 279 acres (1.1 km^{2}) in the Menchville section of Newport News, at the intersection of Menchville and Riverview Farm Parkway.

It is located on land that was formerly associated with the historical Warwicktowne later to become part Denbigh Plantation. Later the property was purchased by Hudson Mench who sold 50 acres to the city for the City farm which was opened 1931. Later the additional park area was purchased from the Mench's.

== Offerings ==
=== Playground and family-use structures ===
Riverview Farm Park is home to a 30,000 square foot (3,000 m^{2}) community playground called Fantasy Farm. The park also has several picnic areas, along with some shelters.

=== Athletics ===
There is a general-use soccer fields at the park site. The fields are adjacent to the playground. Restrooms are provided located between the fields and playground area.

=== Trails ===
Over 3 miles of paved, multi-use trails surround the playground and soccer field area. The Flax Mill Creek Trail runs down to Warwick River. Connecting to the Flax Mill Creek Trail is the James River Trail continuing towards the Marina Trail. The two trails meet at the mouth of the Deep Creek Harbor. The James River Trail has an overlook out on the James River. The Marina trail ends at Menchville Marina.
