= Fort Eustis =

US Army base

- Newport News, Virginia

Site information
- Type: Army Post
- Controlled by: United States Army

Location
- Locations of Fort Eustis and Langley AFB within the Hampton Roads area
- Location in Virginia Fort Eustis (the United States)
- Coordinates: 37.1593°N 76.5752°W

Site history
- Built: 7 March 1918
- In use: 7 March 1918 – present

Garrison information
- Garrison: 733d Mission Support Group (USAF)

Fort Eustis is a United States Army installation in Newport News, Virginia. In 2010, it was combined with nearby Langley Air Force Base to form Joint Base Langley–Eustis.

The post is the home to the United States Army Training and Doctrine Command, the U.S. Army Aviation Logistics School, the 7th Transportation Brigade, and Joint Task Force – Civil Support.

Other significant tenants include the Army Center for Initial Military Training (USACIMT), Army Training Support Center (ATSC), the Army Aviation Applied Technology Directorate (AATD) and Enterprise Multimedia Center (EMC). At Fort Eustis and Fort Story, officers and enlisted soldiers receive education and on-the-job training in all modes of transportation, aviation maintenance, logistics and deployment doctrine and research.

The headquarters of the Army Transportation Corps was at Fort Eustis until 2010 when it moved to Fort Lee.

In accordance with the 2005 BRAC legislation, the administration of Fort Eustis was passed to the 633d Air Base Wing (USAF). The 733d Mission Support Group manages the installation's garrison operations.

== History ==
=== Mulberry Island ===
Much of the low-lying land along the James River which now constitutes Fort Eustis was known in colonial times as Mulberry Island, and was first settled by English colonists shortly after Jamestown was established in 1607. An important event in Virginia's history occurred in the James River off Mulberry Island in the summer of 1610. Survivors of the ill-fated Third Supply mission from England and the Starving Time in the Colony had boarded ships intent on abandoning the floundering Colony of Virginia and were met off Mulberry Point by Lord Delaware with a fleet of ships headed upriver bringing supplies from England and a fresh determination to stay. He literally turned the situation around by convincing the colonists, who had just abandoned Jamestown, to turn their ships around and go back to colonizing in the area, rather than return to England.

Phettiplace (Peter) Clouse was one of the early colonists. Born in Bremen, Germany in 1593, he came to Jamestown, Virginia in 1608 at the age of 15. He sailed upon the English ship Starr from London working as an indentured servant for his passage to the English Colony. In 1619, he was granted 100 acres of land on the east bank of the Warwick River (Warwicksqueake River) on Mulberry Island by Sir George Yeardley, then governor of Virginia. Part of his land grant today is presumed to be land occupied by military housing, a golf course and firing ranges at Fort Eustis. Phettiplace Clouse survived the Indian Massacre of 22 March 1622, as he was listed among the living on the Jamestown Colony muster of 16 February 1623. As a landowner, he was a member of the House of Burgess, Jamestown, Virginia Colony and recorded in attendance 16 October 1629, representing Mulberry Island along with another owner, Thomas Harwood.

Among those who almost left was John Rolfe, who had departed England with his wife and child in 1609, with some very promising seeds for a different strain of tobacco which he hoped would prove more favorable to export from Virginia than had been the experience to date. He had been shipwrecked on Bermuda in Sea Venture, lost his wife and child by this time, but still had the untried seeds. The turning point at Mulberry Island delivered Lord Delaware and businessman-farmer John Rolfe, two very different men, back to Jamestown, where they and the others were to find new success.

Lord Delaware's skills and resources combined with Rolfe's new strain of tobacco to provide the colony with effective leadership structure as the new cash crop began financial stabilization by 1612. By 1614, Rolfe owned an interest in a tobacco plantation. That same year, he became the husband of Pocahontas. For the next 300 years, Mulberry Island remained very rural, until it was bought by the Federal Government in 1918.

=== American Civil War: The Warwick Line ===
During the Peninsula Campaign of the American Civil War in 1862, Fort Crafford on Mulberry Island anchored the southern end of the Warwick Line, a line of Confederate defensive works across the Virginia Peninsula extending to Yorktown on the north at the York River.

=== World War I: Camp Abraham Eustis ===
On 7 March 1918, the Army bought Mulberry Island and the surrounding land for $538,000 as part of the military build-up for World War I. Approximately 200 residents were relocated, many to the Jefferson Park area nearby in Warwick County. Camp Abraham Eustis was established as a coast artillery replacement center for Fort Monroe and a balloon observation school. It was named for Brevet Brigadier General Abraham Eustis, a 19th-century U.S. military leader who had been the first commanding officer of Fort Monroe, a defensive fortification at the mouth of Hampton Roads about 15 miles (24 km) east at Old Point Comfort in what is now the city of Hampton.

=== Camp Wallace ===
A few miles upstream along the James River, a satellite facility, Camp Wallace, was established in 1918 as the Upper Firing Range of for artillery training. Consisting of 30 barracks, six storehouses, and eight mess halls.

Camp Wallace included some rugged terrain and bluffs overlooking the river. It was the site of anti-aircraft warfare training during World War II. Many years later, the Army's aerial tramway was first erected at Camp Wallace and later moved to Fort Eustis near the Reserve Fleet for further testing. The purpose of the tramway was to provide cargo movement from ship-to-shore, shore-to-ship, and overland. The tramway supplemented beach and pier operations, used unloading points deemed unusable due to inadequate or non-navigable waters, or to traverse land that was otherwise impassable.

In 1971, the U.S. Army agreed to a land swap with Anheuser-Busch in return for a larger parcel which is located directly across Skiffe's Creek from Fort Eustis. Along with land previously owned by Colonial Williamsburg, the former Camp Wallace land became part of a massive development.

=== 1923: Camp becomes Fort Eustis ===
Camp Abraham Eustis became Fort Eustis and a permanent military installation in 1923. In 1925 Eustis National Forest was established on the installation. The post was garrisoned by artillery and infantry units until 1931, when it became a federal prison, primarily for bootleggers during Prohibition. The repeal of Prohibition resulted in a prisoner decline and the post was taken over by various other military and non-military activities including a WPA camp that utilized some of the barracks on the post during the Great Depression.

=== World War II, modern times ===
Fort Eustis was reopened as a military installation in August 1940 as the Coast Artillery Replacement Training Center. In 1943, the Caribbean Regiment of the British Army was formed there. In 1946, Fort Eustis became home to the newly formed Transportation School which moved from New Orleans. Training in rail, marine, amphibious operations and other modes of transportation was consolidated at Fort Eustis.

The Base Realignment and Closure directives from the U.S. Congress, resulted in the U.S. Army Transportation School and Center moving to Fort Lee, Va. In 2010, Fort Eustis was merged with nearby Langley Air Force Base as Joint Base Langley-Eustis and its former sub-installation Fort Story was re-aligned as a Naval installation. Joint Base Langley Eustis gained the U.S. Army Training and Doctrine Command after the closure of Fort Monroe.

== Ghost Fleet ==
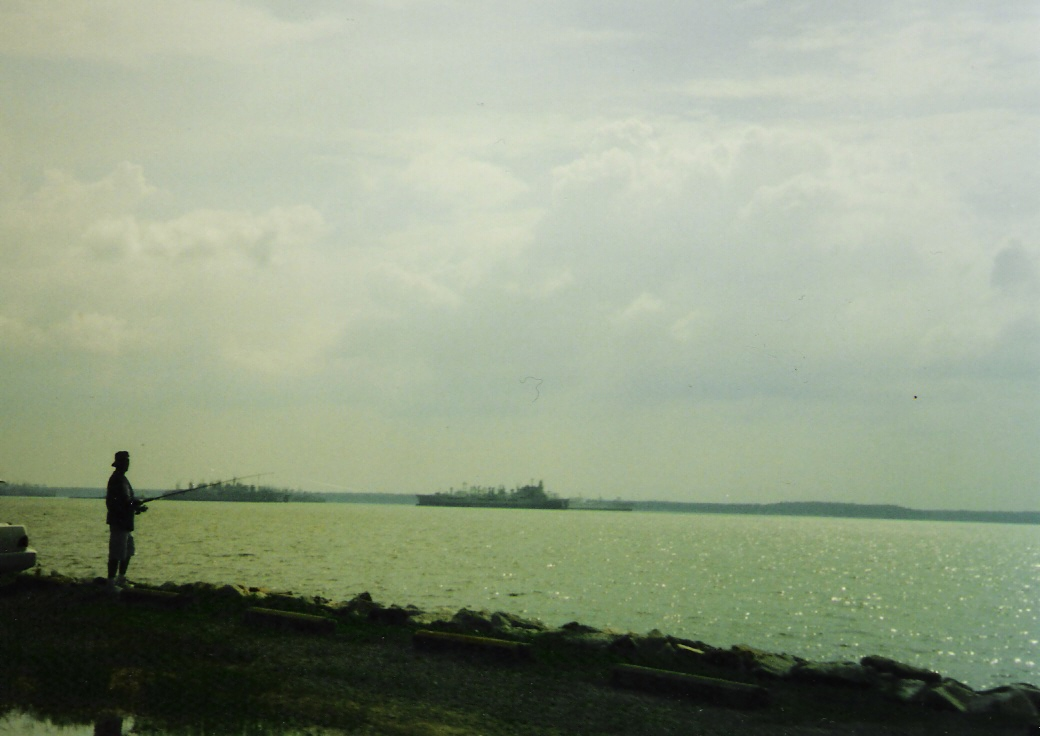
The Ghost fleet (sometimes known as the Dead Fleet) anchored in the James River near Fort Eustis.

A portion of the U.S. Maritime Administration's National Defense Reserve Fleet (NDRF) is anchored in the James River adjacent to Mulberry Island. Known locally as the Ghost Fleet, some of these inactive ships have become too old and deteriorated to ever be reactivated and have become environmental hazards, as they still hold fuel oil and other hazardous substances. Since the start of the 21st century many of these ships, some dating back to the World War II era have been removed under contracts with scrapping companies.

== Transportation Corps Regiment ==
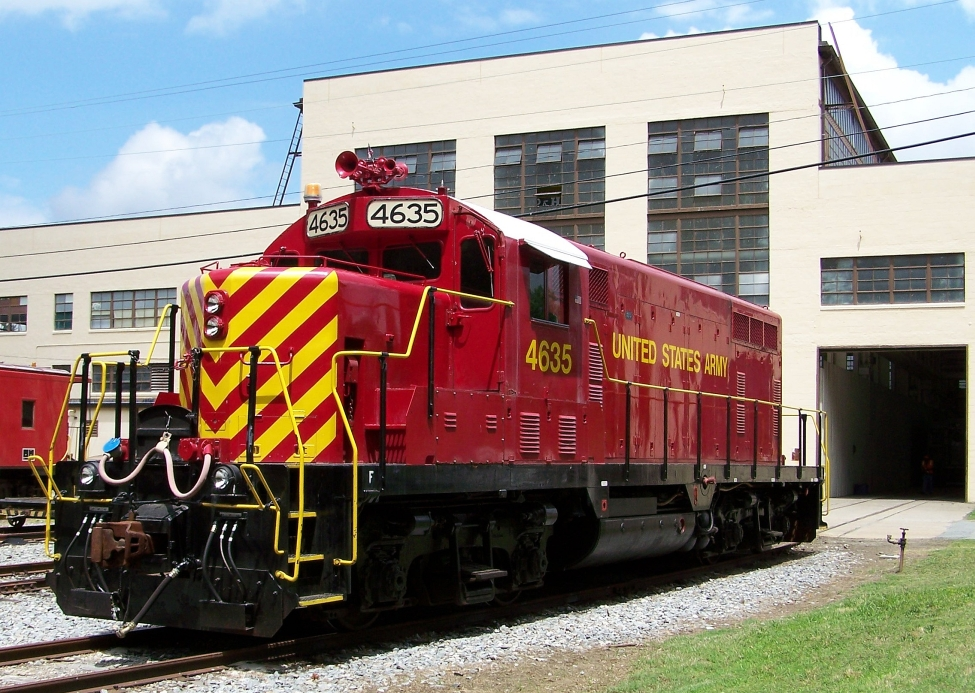
Fort Eustis Military Railroad

On 31 July 1986, the Transportation Corps celebrated its 44th anniversary. This was also the day the Transportation Corps was inducted into the U.S. Army Regimental System. The activation of the Regiment marked the redesignation of several Transportation Corps training commands. The redesignation provided a link with renowned transportation units of the past. The Training Brigade was reflagged the 8th Transportation Brigade, honoring the 8th Transportation Group in Vietnam. The 8th Transportation Group enjoyed an outstanding reputation in Vietnam for its support of numerous tactical operations and for the development of the "gun truck," a highly armored 5-ton truck usually sporting multiple M2 .50 caliber machine guns. The 2nd Battalion, Training Brigade, was reflagged as the 71st Transportation Battalion. The 2nd Battalion, 5th Training Brigade, Fort Dix, was reflagged as the 36th Transportation Battalion. The 5th Battalion, 4th Training Brigade, Fort Leonard Wood was reflagged as the 58th Transportation Battalion. These units were reflagged as part of the Army's parent regiment system.

The regimental crest is inscribed with the Corps motto—Spearhead of Logistics—to symbolize a soldier's affiliation with the Transportation Corps. Upon completion of the Transportation Officer Basic Course, officers are automatically inducted into the Corps, Warrant Officers' are inducted upon completion of the Warrant Officer Candidate Course and enlisted soldiers are inducted upon completion of Advanced Individual Training.

Major General Fred E. Elam, the first Regimental Commander, named General Frank S. Besson, Jr. as the first honorary Colonel of the Regiment (posthumously) in honor of his lifelong service to the Transportation Corps.

== U.S. Army transportation museum ==
The U.S. Army Transportation Museum, a museum of U.S. Army vehicles and other transportation related equipment, and memorabilia, is located on the grounds of Fort Eustis. In June 2025, US Army is slated to Close Army Transportation Museum next 3 years due to consolidation plans. Army Transportation Museum will Relocate to Quartermaster Museum at Fort Lee.

== Gallery ==
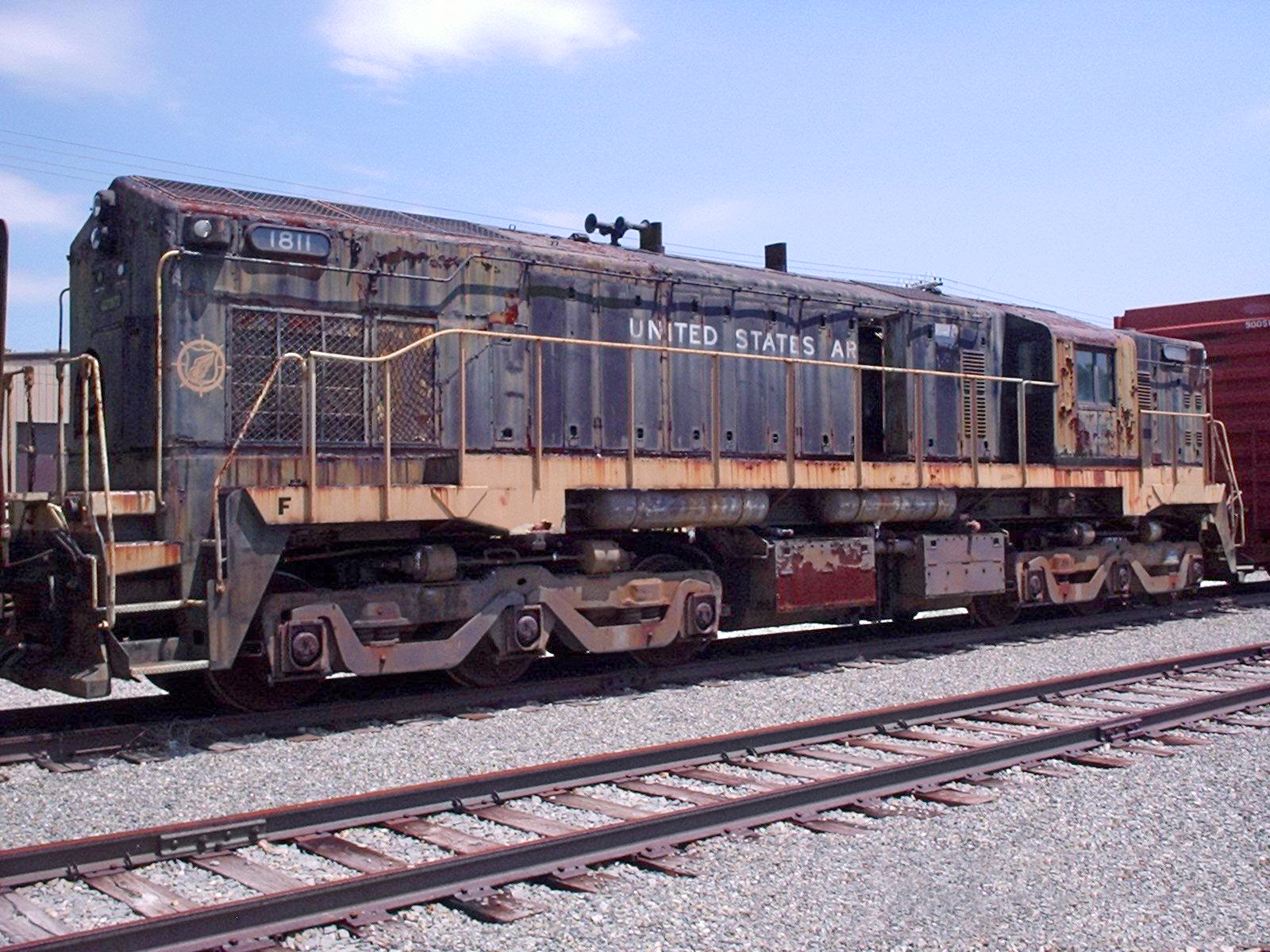
The 1811 was built for the U.S. Army by EMD. It is an EMD MRS-1 class locomotive that has adjustable gauge trucks to run in Europe and Russia. Now it belongs to the museum at Fort Eustis, but sits abandoned in Hanks Yard.

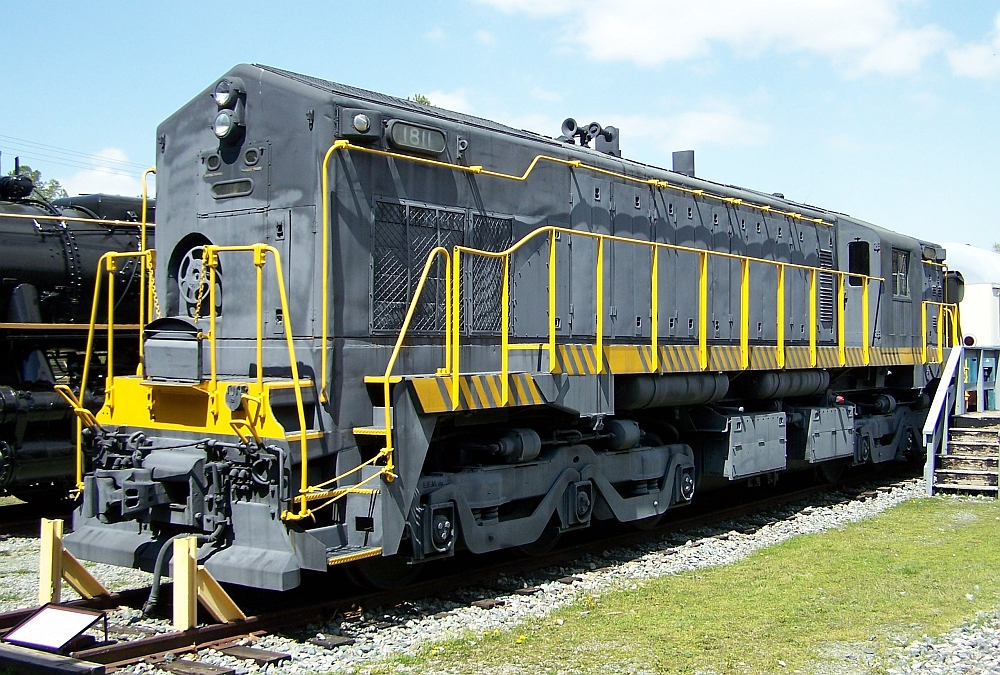
EMD MRS-1 class locomotive that has adjustable gauge, recently painted.

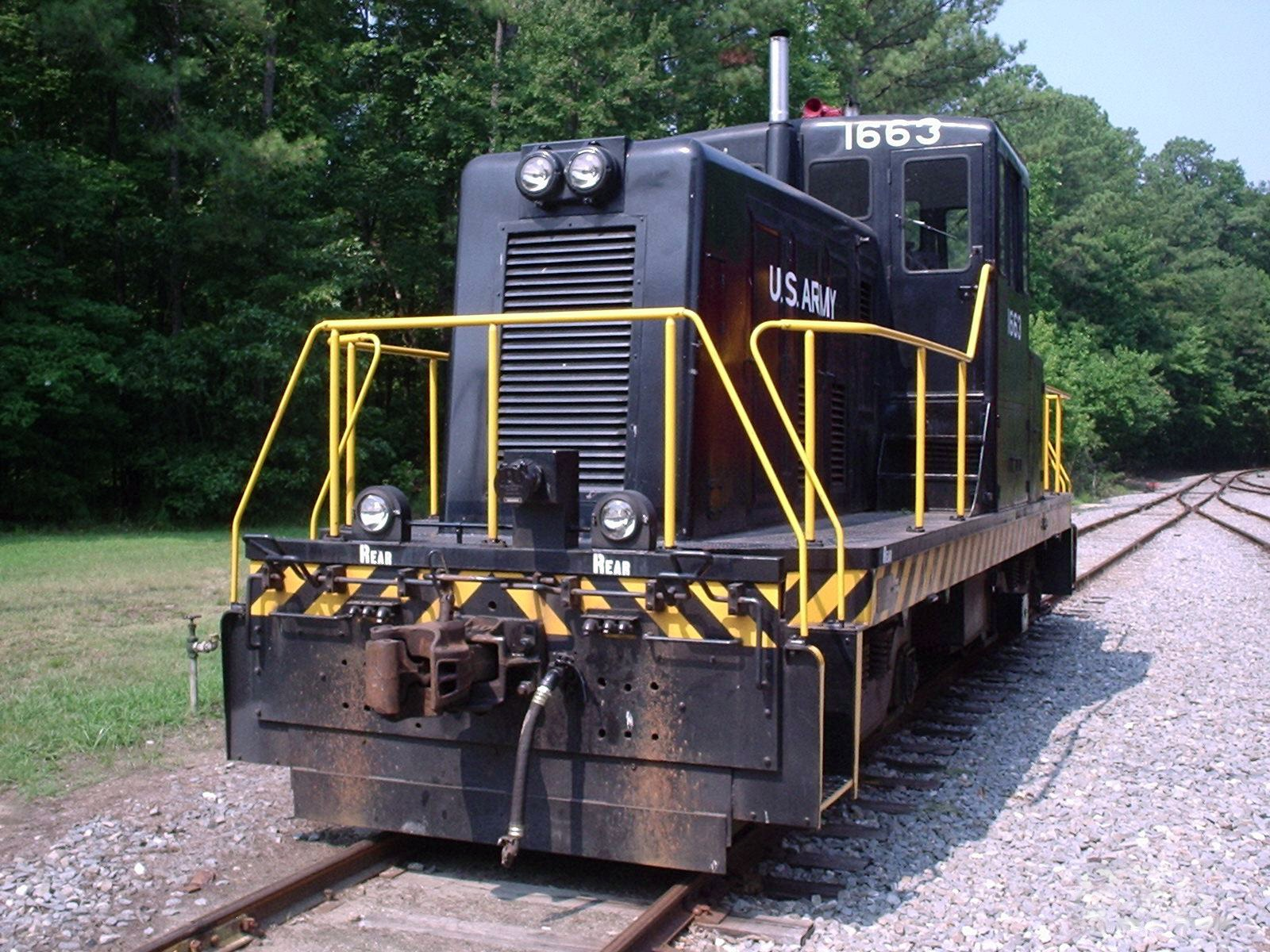
USA 1663, a GE 80-ton switcher, is known as the "tow truck" for its frequent retrieval of the other locomotives on post.

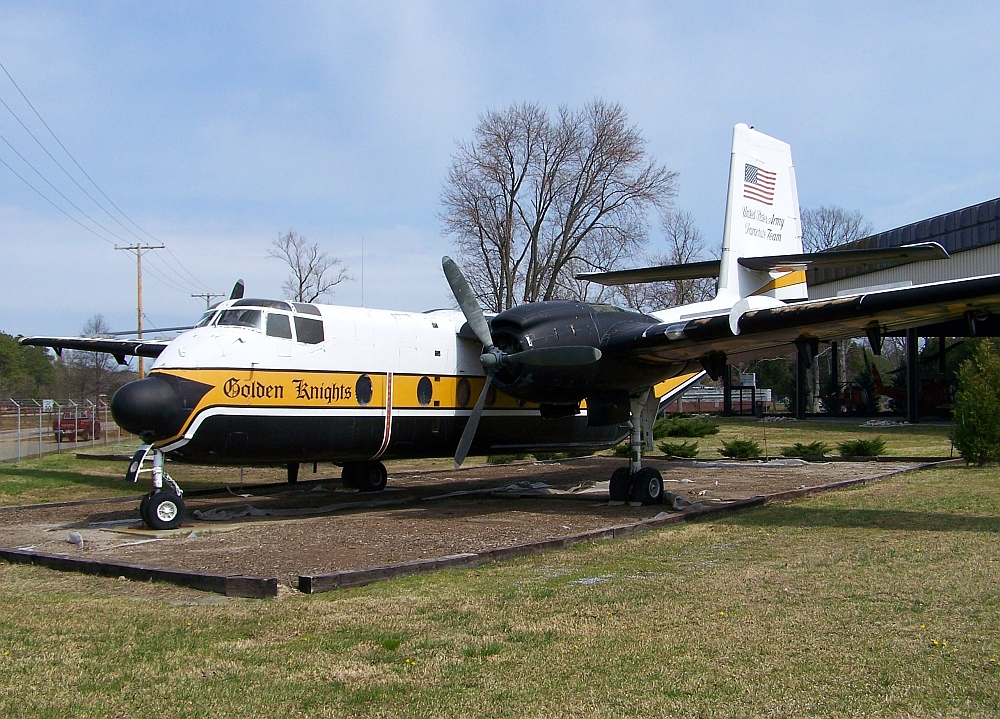
C-7 Caribou.

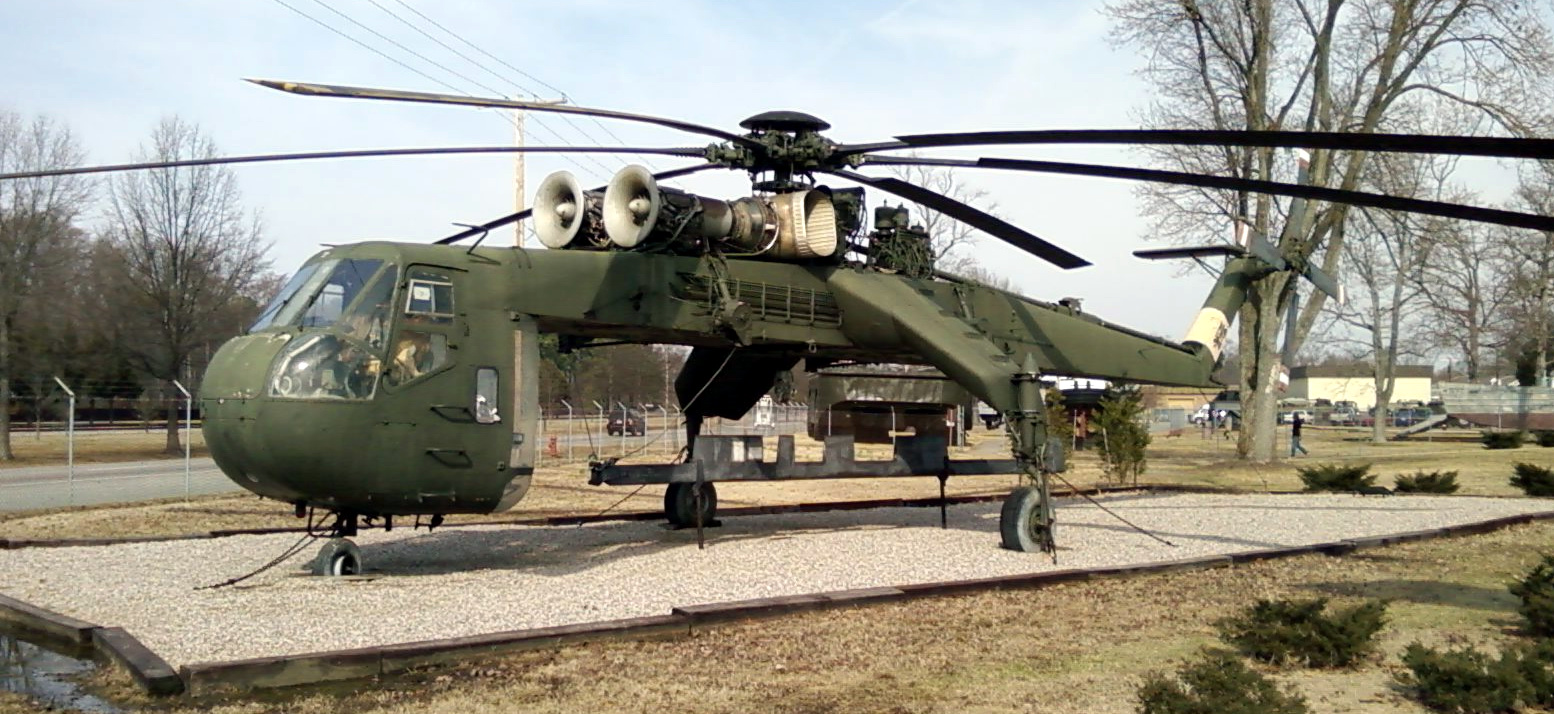
CH-54A (H54A) Tarhe "Sky Crane"

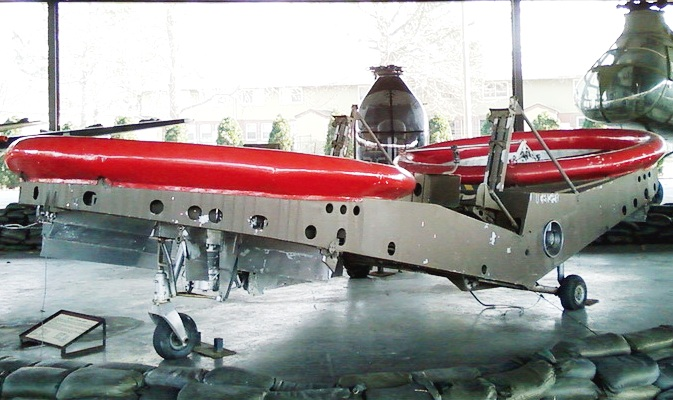
VZ-8P-2 Flying Jeep developed by Piasecki in 1962

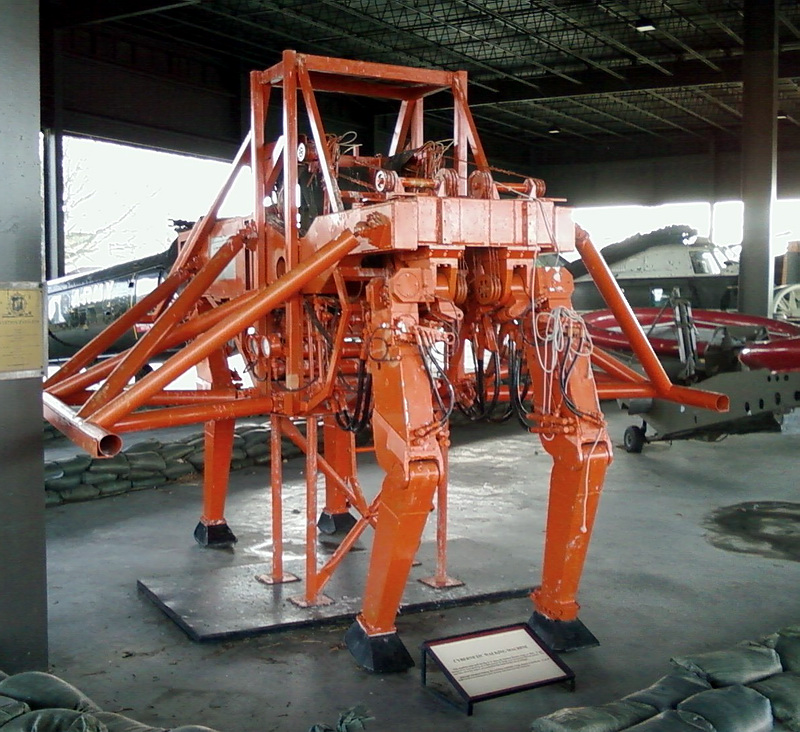
CYBERNETIC WALKING MACHINE Built by General Electric Corp in 1970. It was designed for transporting up to 500 pounds of cargo over extremely difficult terrain.

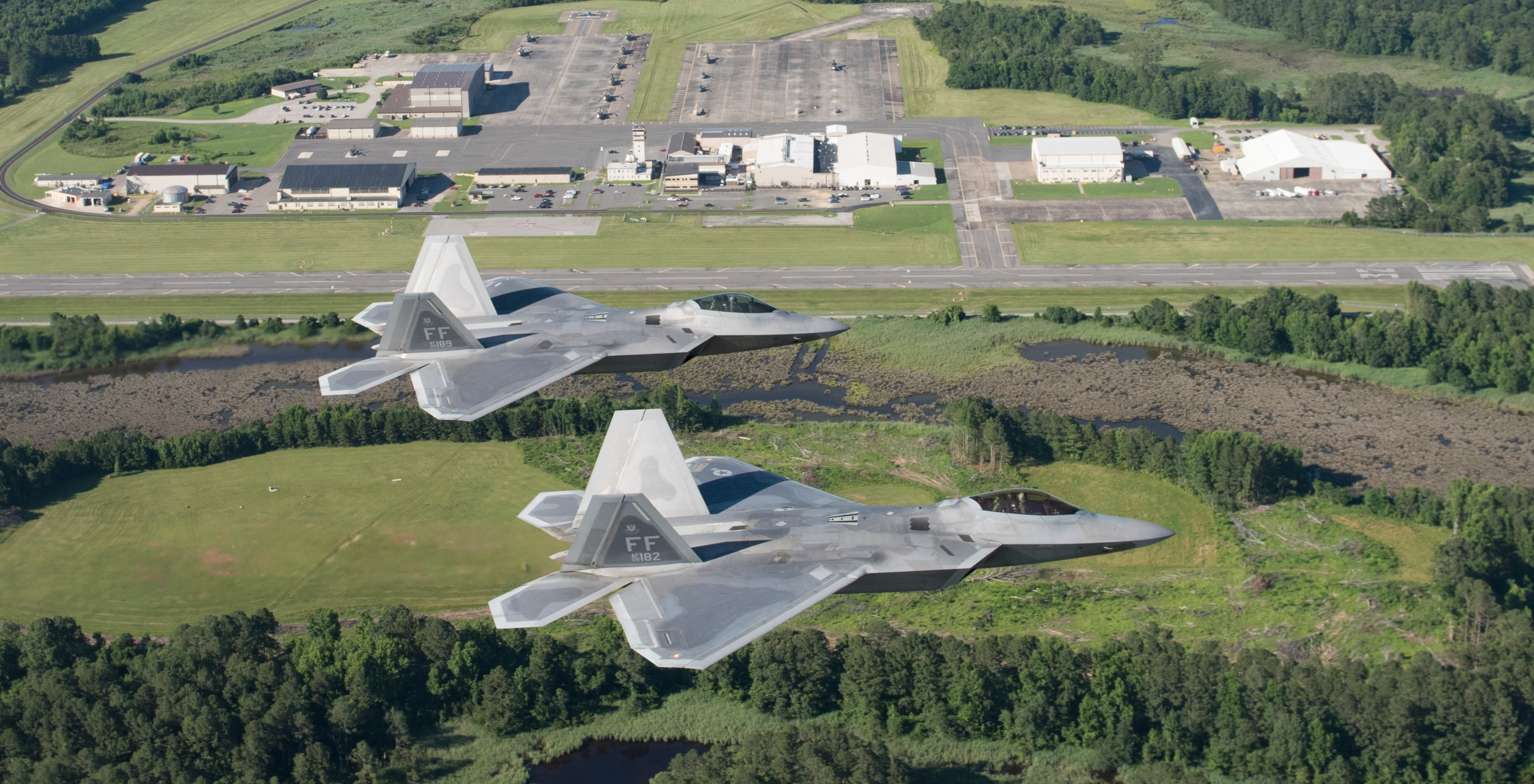
F-22 Raptors fly over Felker Army Airfield.

== Current units ==
The following units are stationed at Fort Eustis:

- U.S. Army Training and Doctrine Command
- 128th Aviation Brigade (US Army Aviation Logistics School)
- 7th Transportation Brigade
- 53rd Transportation Battalion (Movement Control)
- 567th Transportation Company (Inland Cargo Transfer)
- Installation Management Command, Atlantic
- Army Center for Initial Military Training
- Army Training Support Center
- Enterprise Multimedia Center
- Army Aviation Applied Technology Directorate
- 597th Transportation Brigade
- U.S. Army Transportation Museum
- 12th Military Police Detachment (CID)
- 93rd Signal Brigade (Strategic)
- 362nd Training Squadron, Detachment 1 Air Force Helicopter Technical School
- Joint Deployment Training Center
- NCO Academy (Aviation Branch ALC)
- US Army Flight Concepts Division
- McDonald Army Community Hospital
- 221st Military Police Detachment
- 3rd Military Police Detachment (K9)
- 74th Engineer Detachment (Dive)
- 86th Engineer Detachment (Dive)
- 511th Engineer Detachment (Dive)
- 569th Engineer Detachment (Dive)
- Port Security Unit 305

== See also ==
- Fort Eustis Military Railroad
- Logistics Proponency Office
- Matthew Jones House
- U.S. Army Transportation Museum
