= Newport News Park =

Coordinates: 37°10′45″N 76°33′7″W

Newport News Park, in Newport News, Virginia, is the largest park in the system of municipal parks maintained by the Newport News Department of Parks, Recreation and Tourism. At 8,065 acres (32.63 km²), it is one of largest city-run parks in the United States, and offers a wide range of activities for residents and tourists alike.

The park is in the northern part of the city of Newport News (13560 Jefferson Avenue, Newport News VA 23603), with its main entrance on Jefferson Avenue to the northwest of its intersection with Ft. Eustis Boulevard. Farther up Jefferson Avenue is the entrance to its campsite. To the northeast of the intersection, on Ft. Eustis Boulevard, is the secondary entrance at Old Stable Road, and farther up Ft. Eustis Boulevard is the main entrance for the Newport News Golf Club at Deer Run, which is on park grounds. The park shares a long border with the Colonial National Historical Park, and several of its biking and hiking trails cross into it.

== History ==
During the American Civil War, the current park was the site of the Battle of Dam No. 1, part of the Battle of Yorktown (1862). In the days prior to the battle, Confederate forces constructed rifle pits and other earthworks from which they held off the Union Army forces commanded by Maj. Gen. George B. McClellan. The Lee's Mill Earthworks were preserved; though overgrown with woods, they are accessible from the White Oak Nature Trail on the reservoir's camping side.

In the 1960s, as Newport News grew, the city found itself taxing its water supply. The solution was to purchase several lakes in the Lee Hall area and pump the water into the city. To preserve the water's cleanliness, a watershed was created around the new Lee Hall Reservoir. It was developed into Newport News Park in 1966, primarily through the efforts of City Manager Joe Biggins, who considered a large park important to the city's future.

== Campsites, recreation, other facilities ==
Newport News Park has 188 campsites, some of which include electrical and water hookups. It has over 30 miles (50 km) of hiking trails, and a 5.3 mile (8.5 km) multi-use bike path. It offers bicycle and helmet rental (helmets are mandatory for children under 14).

It has an archery range; a disc golf course; and an aeromodel flying field for remote-control aircraft, with a 400 ft (120 m) runway. The park welcomes geocaching, with dozens of geocaches in the park as of September 2018.

It also hosts the Albert E. Dorner cross country invitational annually for several public and private high schools.

== Discovery Center ==
The Newport News Park Discovery Center gives visitors a look at the park in a more structured, educational way. There are exhibits on the park's animal and plant life, and on the land's history, including displays of Civil War artifacts.
