= Denbigh Park Boat Ramp =

Park in Newport News, Virginia

Coordinates: 37°7′25″N 76°34′4.6″W

The Denbigh Park Boat Ramp (also known simply as Denbigh Park) is a park located in the Denbigh area of Newport News, Virginia, USA. It is maintained by the Newport News Department of Parks, Recreation and Tourism. It is located on 13.3 acres (54,000 m^{2}) at the southern end of Denbigh Boulevard.

== Features ==
The boat ramp is the main feature of Denbigh Park. It allows access into the Warwick River, a tributary of the James River. The parking lot provides space for dozens of trucks and boat trailers to be parked. The ramp and parking lot are open from 5 a.m. until 10 p.m., seven days a week.

Denbigh Park features a short hiking trail. Both ends of the trail meet at the park's parking lot. The trail takes about 10 to 15 minutes to navigate from one end to the other, and offers a view of some of the marshland prevalent in the area. Due to the park's location in a quiet residential area, the presence of wildlife is greater than it would be in a park located in the more urban areas of the city. Small fish can be seen in a stream that the trail passes over, as well as crabs. The trails, like most hiking trails in the Newport News Parks system, are open from sunrise to sunset.

The park also offers a small fishing pier, that can accommodate approximately a dozen fishing enthusiasts simultaneously. This pier offers fishing from a saltwater tributary of the James River.
