= Lee's Mill Earthworks =

Archaeological site in Virginia, United States

- U.S. National Register of Historic Places
- Virginia Landmarks Register
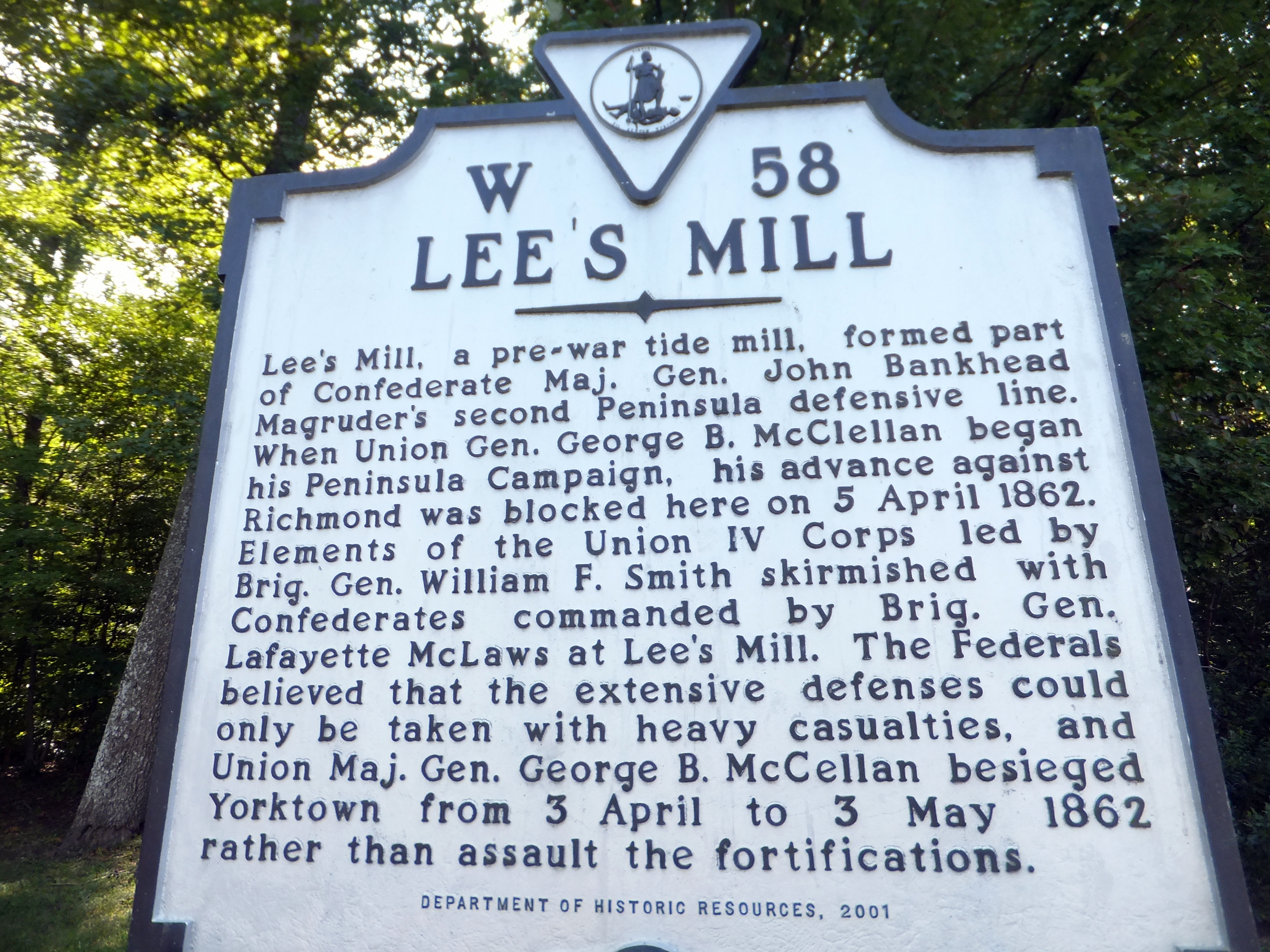
- Lee's Mill Marker, September 2012

- Location within Virginia Location within the United States
- Location: 280 Rivers Ridge Cir., Newport News, Virginia
- Coordinates: 37°10′02″N 76°33′13″W
- Area: 10 acres (4.0 ha)
- Built: 1862
- Built by: Rives, Alfred; St. John, Isaac
- NRHP reference No.: 03000568
- VLR No.: 121-0050

Significant dates
- Added to NRHP: June 23, 2003
- Designated VLR: March 19, 2003

Lee's Mill Earthworks is a historic archaeological site located at Newport News, Virginia. The earthworks formed part of the fortifications along the James River, which included fortifications at Fort Crafford, as well as, Dam No.1, and Wynne's Mill in Newport News Park. On April 5, 1862, advance units of Union Brigadier General Erasmus D. Keyes' IV Corps, under the command of Union Brigadier General William Farrar Smith, encountered Confederate units commanded by Brigadier General Lafayette McLaws at Lee's Mill. Heavy rains and massive earthen fortifications defending the river crossing stopped the Union troops from proceeding to Richmond. Confederate Major General John B. Magruder's extensive defensives beginning at Lee's Mill and extending to Yorktown along the Warwick River caused the Union Army of the Potomac Commander Major General George B. McClellan to initiate a month-long siege of the Warwick-Yorktown Line which lasted until May 3, 1862 and contributed to the eventual failure of McClellan's campaign.

Lee's Mill has recently been preserved and is being transformed into a passive park with trails interpreting the fortifications. The earthen fortifications remain visible in many locations, including Newport News Park and the Lee's Mill subdivision. An active effort will be made to delineate, preserve and interpret these earthworks for the future.

It was listed on the National Register of Historic Places in 2003.
