= Logistics Proponency Office =

The Logistics Proponency Office (formerly the Office of the Chief of Transportation) is the personnel office for the Transportation Corps, the combat service support of the United States Army.

Located at Fort Eustis in Virginia, the office is a General officer-level command that, in conjunction with the Human Resources Command and United States Transportation Command manages career progression for civilians, officers, warrant officers, and enlisted soldiers serving in transportation and logistics roles for the Army.

The explicit mission of the office is the structuring, acquiring, training and educating, distributing, deploying, sustaining, professionally developing, and separating of personnel; policy coordination toward those ends exists between the office and United States Army Training and Doctrine Command and the United States Army Combined Arms Support Command, as the office is the principal Army command responsible for offering a proponency perspective on proposed personnel and structure decisions relative to the Transportation Corps and to Transportation Corps soldiers serving in the United States National Guard and United States Army Reserve.

The office additionally manages the Marine Qualification Division and sea pay programs of the Army and registers vessel names in support of each of the two programs.
