= Eustis National Forest =

Former national forest in Virginia

Eustis National Forest was established in Virginia by the U.S. Forest Service on April 10, 1925 with 4,220 acres (17.1 km^{2}) from part of the Fort Eustis Military Reservation. On December 2, 1927 the executive order for its creation was rescinded and the forest was abolished.
