= McDonald Army Health Center =

Coordinates: 37°09′44″N 76°34′25″W

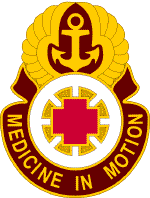
- McDonald Army Health Center
- Active: March 26, 1941 - present
- Country: United States
- Allegiance: United States of America
- Branch: United States Army
- Type: Clinic
- Role: Outpatient Services
- Garrison/HQ: Joint Base Langley-Eustis, Virginia
- Motto(s): Readiness and Excellence Starts with Us! "Medicine in Motion"

Commanders
- Current commander: LTC Michael Brown

McDonald Army Health Center is a military treatment facility at Fort Eustis in Virginia.

Fort Eustis' first hospital opened on March 26, 1941, and was commanded by Colonel William Borden. The War Department declared the hospital surplus property in August 1944 and transferred it to the Navy Department. The hospital was transferred back to the Army on February 1, 1946, and renamed U.S. Army Hospital, Fort Eustis on September 1, 1948. In March 1961 it was renamed for Brigadier General Robert McDonald.

The current facility was built in 1964. Additions were made of an outpatient clinic in 1976, orthopedic and women's health clinics in 1993, administration building in 1998, and business office in 1999.

The hospital was converted to military treatment facility (MTF) in 2005. Now called McDonald Army Health Center, it is a JCAHO-accredited facility but does not provide inpatient or emergency care. Major services include family health, pediatrics, specialty care and out-patient surgical care.
