= Aviation Applied Technology Directorate =

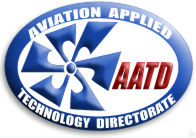
U.S. Army Aviation Applied Technology Directorate Logo.

The United States Army Aviation Applied Technology Directorate (AATD) is a tenant activity located at Fort Eustis, Virginia. It is a directorate of the Aviation Development Directorate under the Aviation and Missile Research, Development, and Engineering Center (AMRDEC), a part of the Research, Development and Engineering Command (RDECOM). Circa 2019 AATD was renamed the Technology Development Directorate - Aviation.

== History ==
The predecessor organization of AATD was established as the Transportation Corps Board on 16 December 1944 at Fort Monroe, Virginia. The original mission of the organization was research and development of all modes of transportation for the newly formed Transportation Corp. In 1946 it was transferred to the Brooklyn Army Base, Brooklyn, New York. The Directorate has been located at Fort Eustis since 1950.

The technology base pioneered for the UH-60 Black Hawk and the AH-64 Apache was established by AATD in the late 60s and 70s, and much of technological advancements have been developed and applied since then. These include elastomeric bearings, elastic pitch beam tail rotor blade, crashworthy subsystems (e.g., fuel systems, landing gear, seating, structure), vibration reduction, aircrew and passenger restraint systems, Cockpit Air Bag System (CABS), wire strike protection system (WSPS), the General Electric T700 and LHTEC T800 engines.
