= Boulevard Park, Sacramento, California =

- Boulevard Park
- U.S. National Register of Historic Places
- U.S. Historic district
- Location within Sacramento, California Location within Northern California Location within California
- Location: Midtown Sacramento, California
- Coordinates: 38°34′53″N 121°28′32″W
- Architect: Multiple
- NRHP reference No.: 11000705
- Added to NRHP: October 16, 2011

Boulevard Park is a historic residential neighborhood in Sacramento, California. It is also the Boulevard Park Historic District, listed on the National Register of Historic Places.

== Location ==
This neighborhood's official borders are: E Street to the north; J Street to the south; 16th Street to the west; and 24th Street to the east.

== History ==
The new subdivision of Boulevard Park, the second subdivision after Oak Park but the first within city limits, was originally formed on what was previously the old state fairgrounds and its racetrack. It was in 1905 that the land was sold to developers who converted the fairgrounds and divided the land into three subsections.

After World War II, many original homeowners of the subdivision sold their homes and moved into newer suburbs, altering the atmosphere of the neighborhood as some of the new landlords used the homes as boarding houses. Urban renewal in the 1970s reclaimed the Boulevard Park area and homes were restored to their former architectural glory. Many are Historic district contributing properties.

Today, the subdivision consists of about 300 buildings and it is the largest neighborhood in Sacramento on the National Register of Historic Places.

Agricultural Park racetrack (1890s)

== Schools ==
- Elementary: Washington Elementary School, 520 18th Street

== Government ==
Boulevard Park is represented by the following government districts:

- Sacramento City Council: Sacramento City District 4
- Sacramento County Board of Supervisors: Sacramento County District 1
- California State Legislature: 6th Assembly District; 8th Senate District
- United States House of Representatives: California's 7th congressional district, represented by Democrat Doris Matsui.

== See also ==
- History of Sacramento, California
- National Register of Historic Places listings in Sacramento County, California
- California Historical Landmarks in Sacramento County, California
- Index: Historic districts in California
