= King-Lincoln Park =

Park in Virginia, United States

Coordinates: 36°58′3.5″N 76°24′40.7″W

King-Lincoln Park is an 18.8 acre (76,000 m²) park in Newport News, Virginia. It is maintained by the Newport News Department of Parks, Recreation and Tourism.

== Location ==
It is located on Hampton Roads. Since 1937, a beach has existed in the park.
