= Southern Terminal Redoubt =

Archaeological site in Virginia, United States

- U.S. National Register of Historic Places
- Virginia Landmarks Register
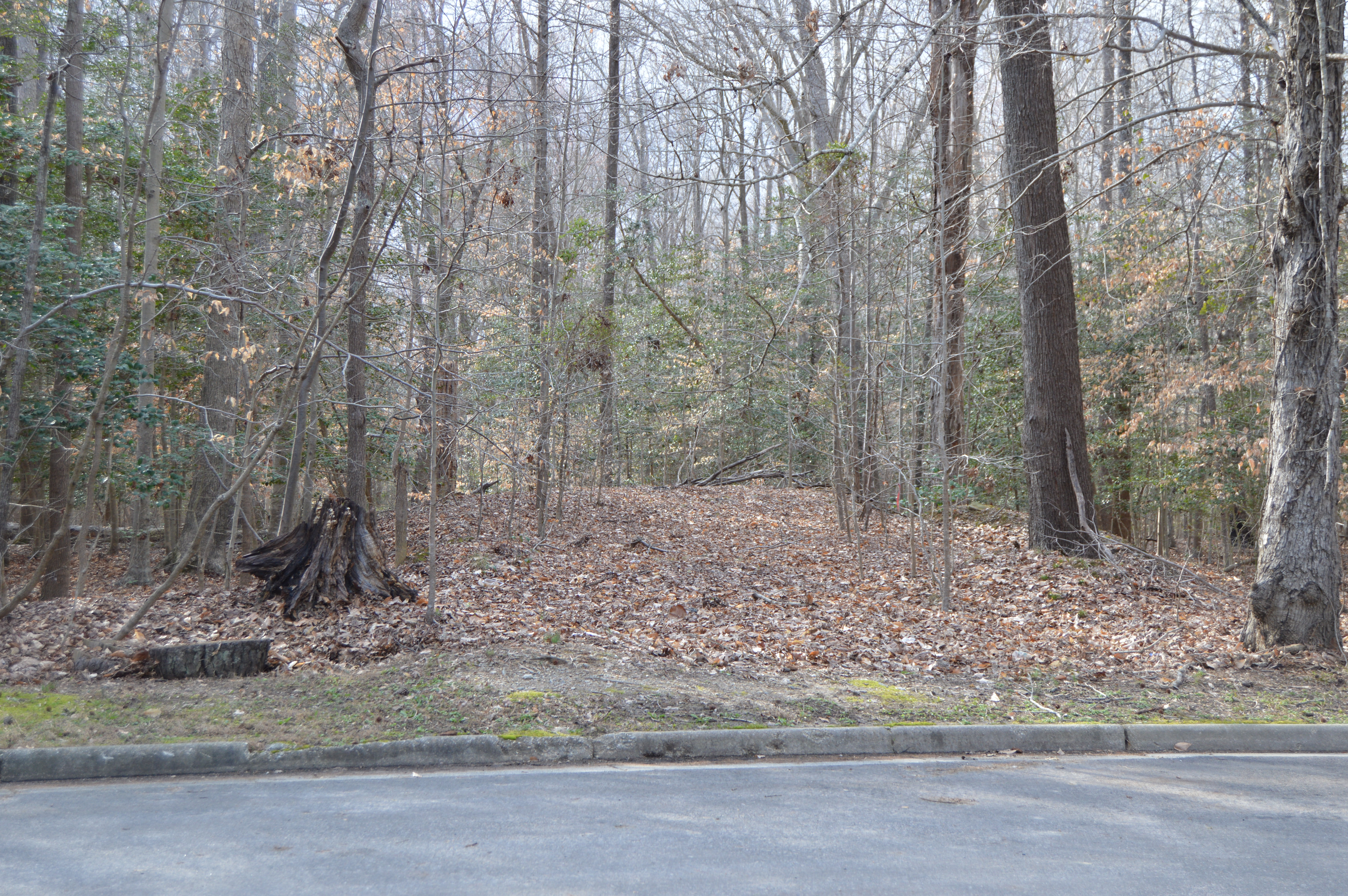
- Overview
- Location: Address Restricted, Newport News, Virginia
- Area: 1.1 acres (0.45 ha)
- MPS: Oakland Farm Industrial Park MRA
- NRHP reference No.: 83003296
- VLR No.: 121-0041

Significant dates
- Added to NRHP: February 24, 1983
- Designated VLR: September 16, 1982

Southern Terminal Redoubt is a historic archaeological site located at Newport News, Virginia. It is a uniquely intact component that represents the southern end of General John B. Magruder's defensive Warwick Line. It is a relatively small defensive earthwork that constitutes one of the few surviving and undisturbed remnants of the 1862 Peninsula Campaign in Virginia. It is representative of a major military feat significant to the outcome of the American Civil War and exemplifies diverse types of defensive adaptation. An archaeological investigation of this site could yield new insights into Civil War military architecture.

It was listed on the National Register of Historic Places in 1983.
