= Newport News Department of Parks, Recreation and Tourism =

The Newport News Department of Parks, Recreation and Tourism (also known as Newport News Parks) is the government agency responsible for maintaining city parks and other sites of interest to tourists and the general population within the city of Newport News, Virginia. It is under the authority of Assistant City Manager Alan Archer. The Director of Newport News Parks is Michael Poplawski.

== Parks ==
Newport News Parks is responsible for the maintenance of thirty-two city parks. The smallest is less than half an acre (2,000 m^{2}). The largest, Newport News Park, is 7,711 acres (31.21 km^{2}). The parks are scattered throughout the city, from Endview Plantation in the northern end of the city to King-Lincoln Park in the southern end near the Monitor-Merrimac Memorial Bridge-Tunnel. The parks offer a variety of services to visitors, ranging from traditional park services like camping and fishing to activities like archery and disc golf.

== Historic sites ==
Newport News Parks maintains eight historic sites within the city. Four of these are located within parks.

- Battle of Dam #1, located in Newport News Park
- Battle of Lee's Mill, located in Lee's Mill Park
- Congress and Cumberland Overlook, located in Christopher Newport Park
- Monitor-Merrimac Overlook, located in Anderson Park
- Skiffe's Creek Redoubt
- Warwick County Courthouses
- Newport News Victory Arch
- Young's Mill

All of these historic sites (with the exception of the Victory Arch) were significant during the Peninsula Campaign of the American Civil War in 1862.

== Museums ==
Five museums are run by the department:

- Endview Plantation, located in Newport News Park
- Lee Hall Mansion
- Lee Hall Train Depot
- Newsome House Museum & Cultural Center
- Virginia War Museum
- Mariners' Museum

== Sports programs and community centers ==
Newport News Parks runs eight sports facilities and community centers in the city for use by city residents.

- Achievable Dream Tennis Center
- Brittingham-Midtown Community Center
- Deer Run Golf Course
- Doris Miller Recreation Center
- Huntington Park Tennis Center
- Riverview Gymnastics Center
- Stoney Run Athletics Center
- Warwick Recreation Center

The department runs youth leagues for basketball, American football, soccer, indoor field hockey, and wrestling. Leagues are also run for adults in basketball, flag football, softball, table tennis, and volleyball.
