= Siege of Yorktown (1862) =

Battle of the American Civil War

Coordinates: 37.184°N 76.534°W

- Part of the American Civil War
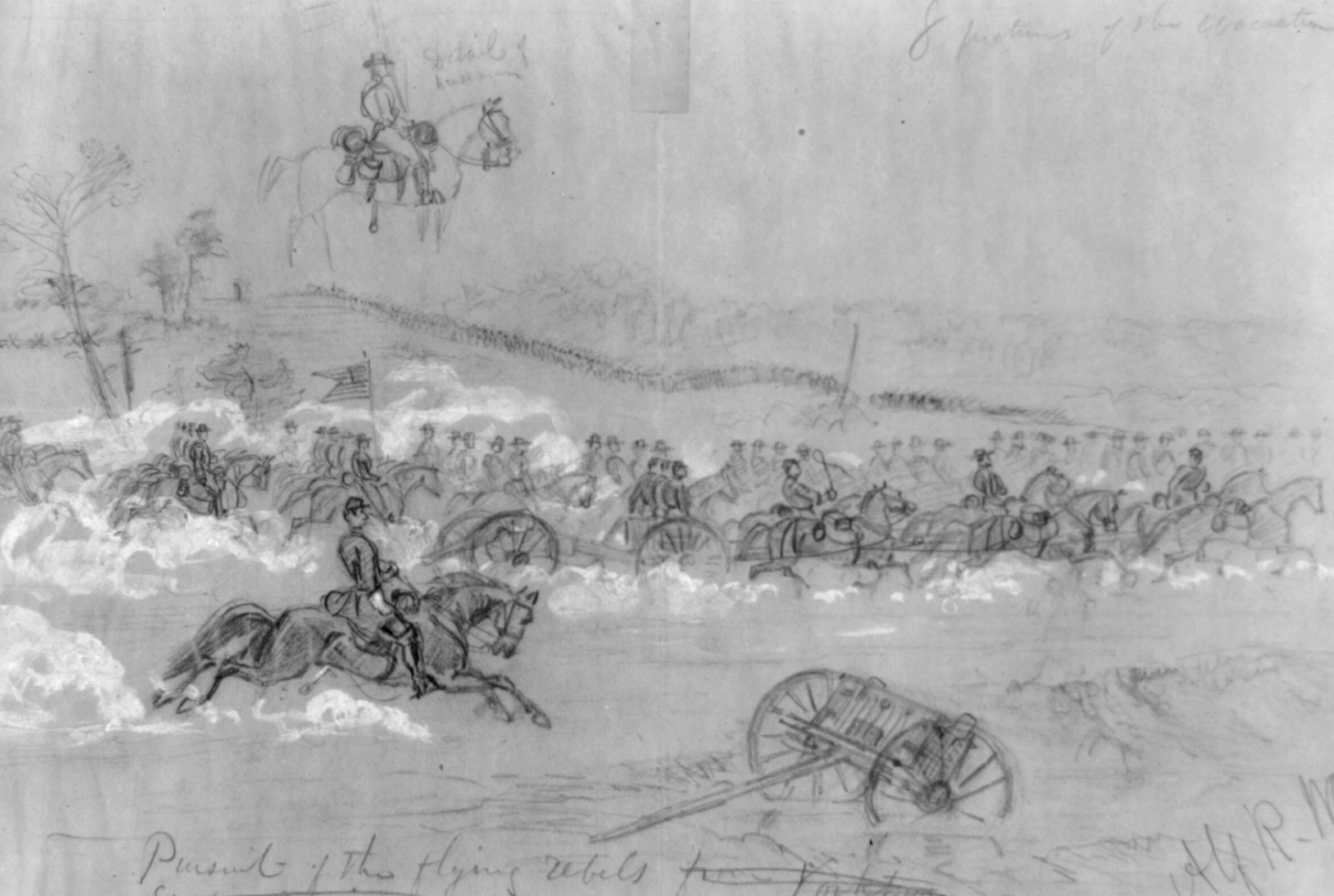
- Pursuit of the flying rebels from Yorktown Sunday morning. Alfred R. Waud, artist.
Date	April 5 – May 4, 1862; (4 weeks and 1 day)
Location	York County and Newport News, Virginia
Result	Inconclusive

Belligerents
United States	Confederate States

Commanders and leaders
George B. McClellan	John B. Magruder; Joseph E. Johnston

Strength
c. 58,000 rising to 102,670	72,379

Casualties and losses
182	300

The Battle of Yorktown or Siege of Yorktown was fought from April 5 to May 4, 1862, as part of the Peninsula campaign of the American Civil War. Marching from Fort Monroe, Union Maj. Gen. George B. McClellan's Army of the Potomac encountered Maj. Gen. John B. Magruder's small Confederate force at Yorktown behind the Warwick Line. McClellan suspended his march up the Peninsula toward Richmond and settled in for siege operations.

On April 5, the IV Corps of Brig. Gen. Erasmus D. Keyes made initial contact with Confederate defensive works at Lee's Mill, an area McClellan expected to move through without resistance. Magruder's ostentatious movement of troops back and forth convinced the Union that his works were strongly held. As the two armies fought an artillery duel, reconnaissance indicated to Keyes the strength and breadth of the Confederate fortifications, and he advised McClellan against assaulting them. McClellan ordered the construction of siege fortifications and brought his heavy siege guns to the front. In the meantime, Gen. Joseph E. Johnston brought reinforcements for Magruder.

On April 16, Union forces probed a point in the Confederate line at Dam No. 1. The Union failed to exploit the initial success of this attack, however. This lost opportunity held up McClellan for two additional weeks while he tried to convince the U.S. Navy to bypass the Confederates' big guns at Yorktown and Gloucester Point, ascend the York River to West Point and outflank the Warwick Line. McClellan planned a massive bombardment for dawn on May 5, but the Confederate army slipped away during the night of May 3 toward Williamsburg.

The battle took place near the site of the 1781 siege of Yorktown.

== Background ==
McClellan had chosen to approach the Confederate capital of Richmond, Virginia, with an amphibious operation that landed troops on the tip of the Virginia Peninsula at Fort Monroe. His Army of the Potomac numbered 121,500 men, transported starting on March 17 by 389 vessels. McClellan planned to use U.S. Navy forces to envelop Yorktown, but the emergence of the Confederate ironclad CSS Virginia and the Battle of Hampton Roads (March 8–9, 1862) disrupted this plan. The threat of the Virginia on the James River and the heavy Confederate batteries at the mouth of the York River prevented the Navy from assuring McClellan that they could control either the York or the James, so he settled on a purely land approach toward Yorktown.

The Confederate defenders of Yorktown, led by Maj. Gen. John B. Magruder, initially numbered only 11,000–13,000 men; the rest of the Confederate forces, under the overall command of General Joseph E. Johnston, remained spread out across eastern Virginia at Culpeper, Fredericksburg, and Norfolk. Magruder constructed a defensive line from Yorktown on the York River, behind the Warwick River, to Mulberry Point on the James River (even taking advantage of some trenches originally dug by Cornwallis in 1781) to effectively block the full width of the Peninsula, although he could adequately man none of the defensive works at that time. This became known as the Warwick Line.

McClellan's plan called for Maj. Gen. Samuel P. Heintzelman's III Corps to fix the Confederate troops in their trenches near the York River, while the IV Corps under Brig. Gen. Erasmus D. Keyes enveloped the Confederate right and cut off their lines of communication. McClellan and his staff, ignorant of the extent of Magruder's line, assumed the Confederates had concentrated only in the immediate vicinity of Yorktown.

== Battle ==
=== Union advance and Lee's Mill ===
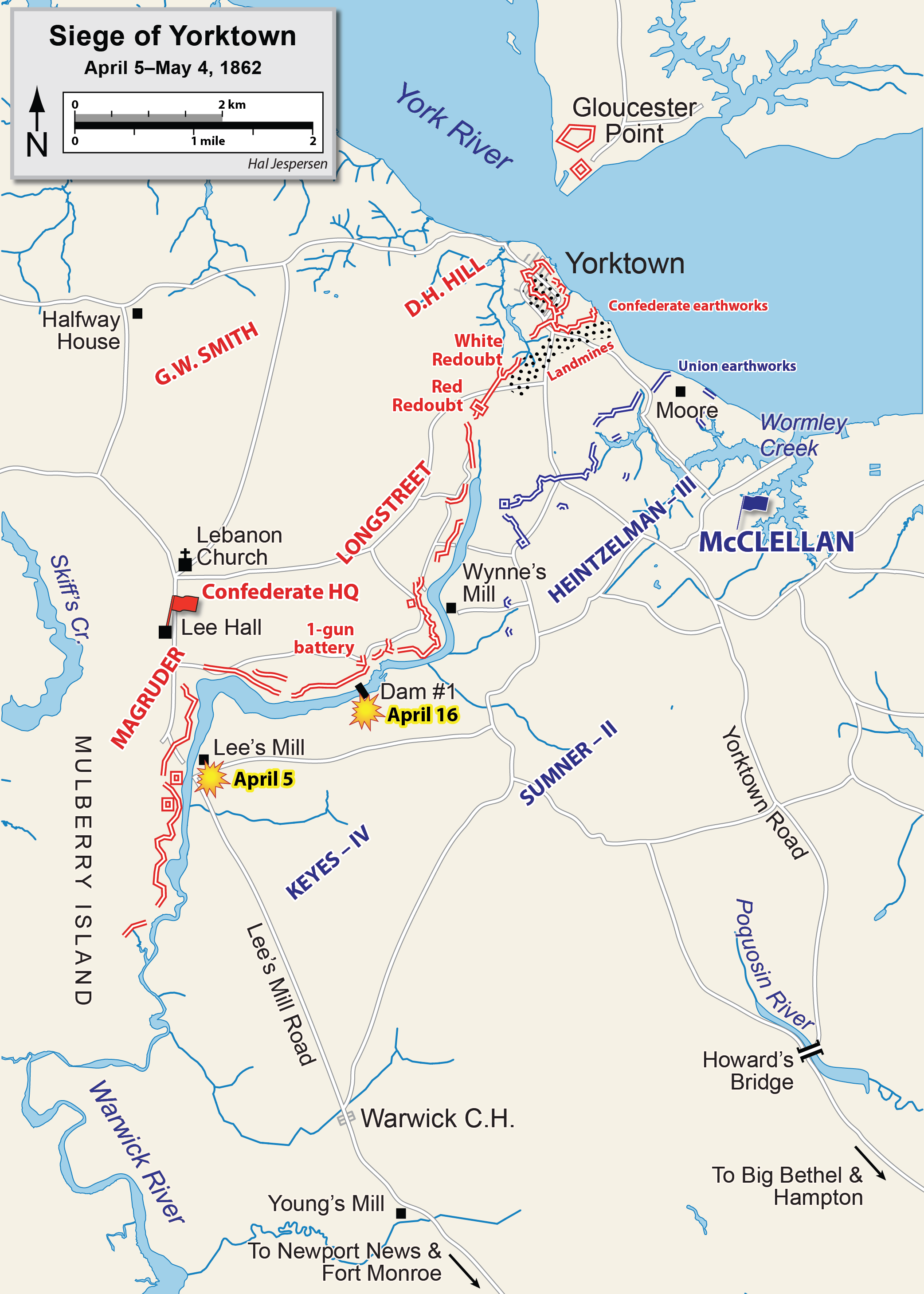
Siege of Yorktown, April–May 1862 Confederate Union

On April 4, 1862, the Union Army pushed through Magruder's initial line of defense but the following day encountered his more effective Warwick Line. The nature of the terrain made it difficult to determine the exact disposition of the Confederate forces. McClellan estimated that the Confederates had 15,000 to 18,000 troops in the defensive line. Accounts by Magruder's soldiers indicate he marched his troops back and forth throughout his lines as a ruse to make his forces look stronger. "This morning we were called out by the 'Long roll' and have been traveling most of the day, seeming with no other view than to show ourselves to the enemy at as many different points of the line as possible," a Louisiana soldier recorded in his diary. Magruder's own reports, however, do not mention this. Word of Magruder's deception reached Richmond nevertheless, with Mary Chestnut noting in her diary, "It was a wonderful thing how he played his ten thousand before McClellan like fireflies and utterly deluded him..." On 6–7 April, McClellan estimated (given Magruder's reinforcements) that 30,000 troops were at Yorktown. Troops continued to arrive and on 20 April McClellan estimated "more than 80,000" were at Yorktown.

McClellan had five divisions available and advanced in two columns. The 4th Corps of two divisions under Keyes advanced towards Lee's Mill, while the 3rd Corps of two divisions under Heintzelman advanced towards Yorktown proper. He kept the 2nd Corps division under (Sedgwick) in reserve to commit to either column. The lead division of Keyes' corps under Brigadier General W.F. Smith contacted the position at Lee's Mill in the early afternoon of the 5th. Smith had two brigades (Davidson and Hancock) and a battery (Wheeler's) to hand and attempted to suppress the superior enemy artillery. He lost the firefight and despite an order from McClellan to Keyes "to attack with all his force if only with the bayonet", Smith withdrew back to Warwick Court House. The 3rd Corps advanced directly towards Yorktown, but were stopped by heavy artillery fire.

That evening McClellan ordered two brigades to march across the entire frontage of the enemy line. The next day (April 6) Hancock and Burns took parts of their brigades and marched across the entire frontage to provoke enemy fire. Hancock took the 6th Maine Infantry and 5th Wisconsin Infantry left to right, and Burns went right to left. This proved that there was no break in the river that could easily be assaulted. That evening a major storm started, and shut down all troop movements until the 10th. Further recces were ordered in order to find a weak point to attack, and on April 9 Hancock performed a reconnaissance around Dam Number One, where Magruder had widened the Warwick to create a water obstacle nearby. The rebel picket line was along the Garrow Ridge on the eastern side of the river. Hancock drove off the Confederate pickets and took some prisoners. Smith and the attached engineer (Comstock) noted this was the only place along the river where the ground was higher on the eastern bank than the western, and hence was vulnerable. McClellan chided Smith for not taking an opportunity to attack stating "If you had gone and succeeded, you would have been a Major General". Hancock considered this area a weak spot in the line, but his messenger was captured by the rebels en route to Smith's HQ. Keyes believed that the Warwick Line fortifications could not be carried by assault and so informed McClellan.

During this phase, Union Army Balloon Corps aeronaut Professor Thaddeus S. C. Lowe used two balloons, the Constitution and the Intrepid, to perform aerial observation. On April 11, Intrepid carried Brig. Gen. Fitz John Porter, a division commander of the III Corps, aloft, but a failed tether sent the balloon over enemy lines, causing great consternation in the Union command before the winds returned him to safety. Confederate Captain John Bryan suffered a similar wind mishap in a hot air balloon over the Yorktown lines.

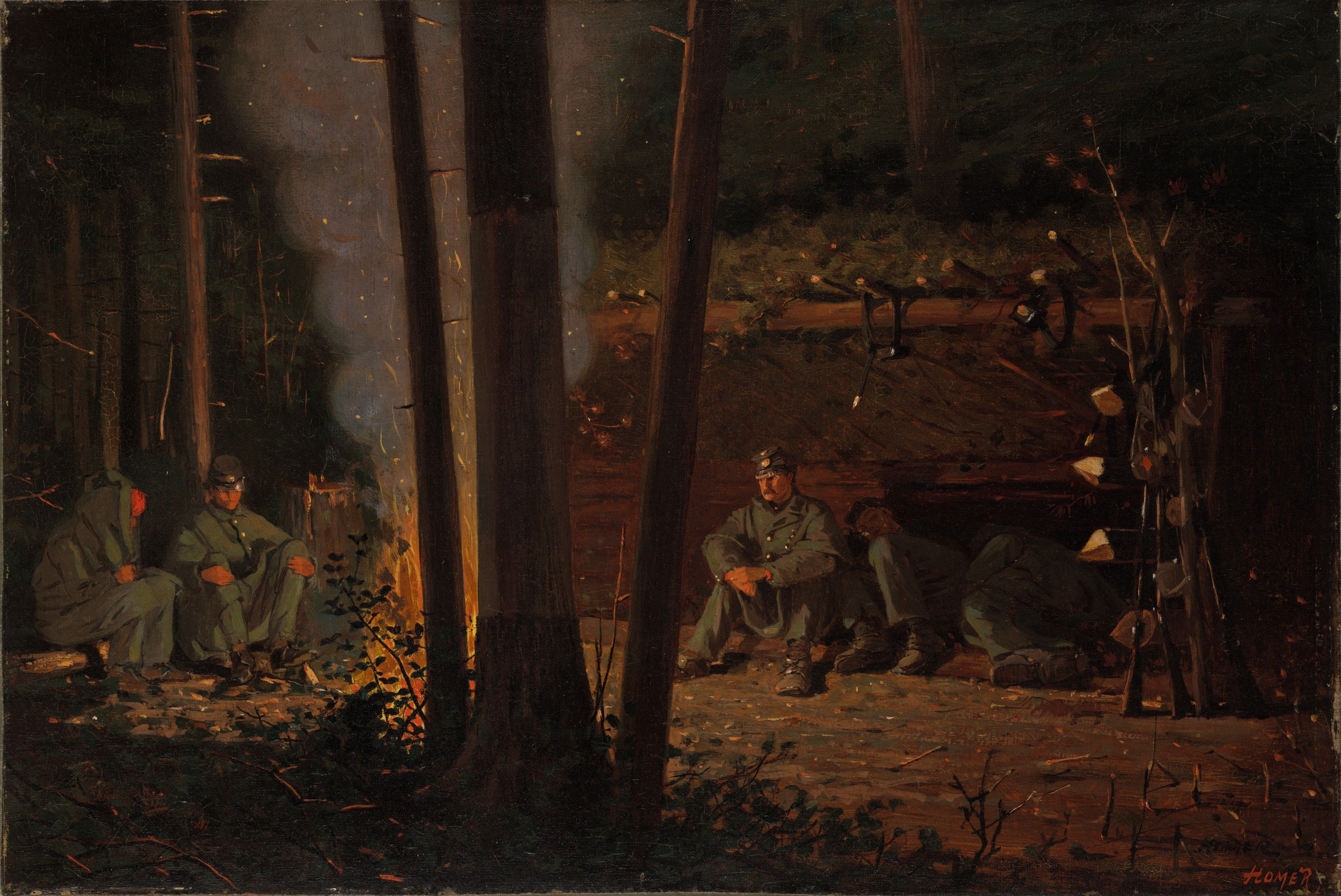
In Front of Yorktown, 1862–1863, by Winslow Homer

=== Dam No. 1 ===
- Dam No. One Battlefield Site
- U.S. National Register of Historic Places
- Location within Virginia Location within the United States
- Location: 13560 Jefferson Ave., Newport News, Virginia
- Area: 143 acres (58 ha)
- Built: 1862
- NRHP reference No.: 95000972
- Added to NRHP: August 4, 1995

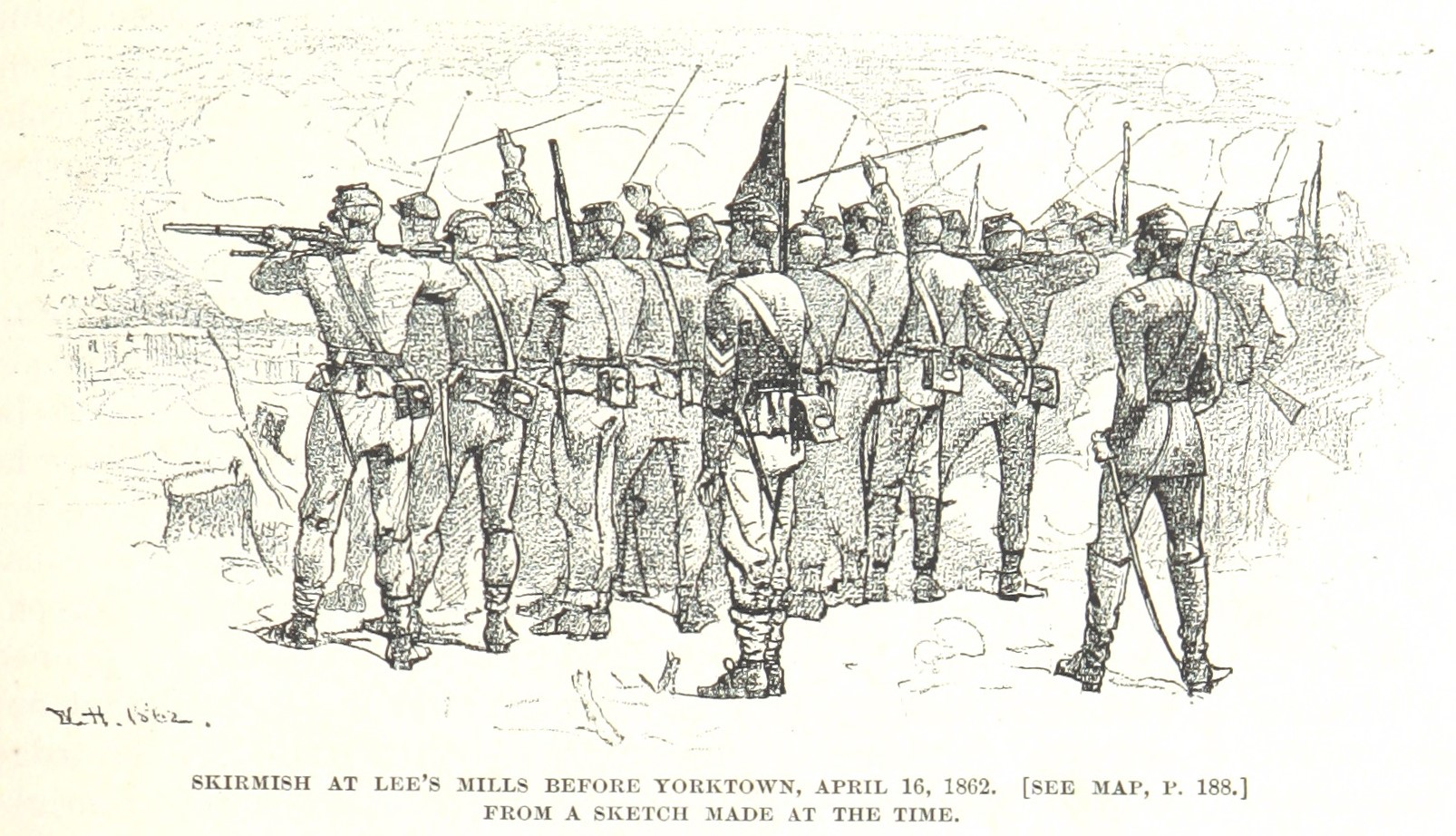
The skirmish near Dam Number One

It was to the amazement of the Confederates – who had estimated the Union's strength at 200,000, four times the real number – and the dismay of President Abraham Lincoln that McClellan did not attack immediately. McClellan wished to either turn the position with an amphibious movement or find a weak point where an assault stood a reasonable chance of success. The Navy refused to cooperate, but on 14 April, McClellan's chief engineer John G. Barnard finally reported that a weak point had been found at Dam No. 1, located on the Warwick River. McClellan developed a plan of attack at that point. Initially a division (Smith's) would seize and occupy Garrow Ridge overlooking the dams. This would prevent the rebels from conducting further work on a fort they were building at the river's edge and prevent rebel scouts from finding the assembling assault forces. He would then assemble a large force behind the ridge and assault the rebel fortifications. On April 15 orders were sent to Smith to occupy the Garrow Ridge and probe the rebel fortifications to see whether there was a clearing in the woods behind the crossing. All the uncommitted units (Casey's Division, Richardson's Division and [Henry] Naglee's brigade) were ordered to assemble ready to assault in the following days.

Smith's operations, which took place on April 16, were a debacle. Initially wildly successful in seizing the Garrow Ridge and advancing a small force to drive off the rebels, McClellan considered the task completed, and returned to his HQ to arrange for the assaulting units to move into position. Smith then decided to advance a small force of Vermonters across the Dam against his orders. They were rapidly pinned down as Brig. Gen. Howell Cobb's brigade, supported by two others, came down on this small force, and were driven back. In the process they collapsed the dam, and destroyed the crossing point. This rendered the planned assault impossible. Smith faced a severe criticism for his failure, and was the subject of a witchhunt by a Vermont senator.

Drummer Julian Scott, along with First Sergeant Edward Holton and Captain Samuel E. Pingree were awarded the Medal of Honor for their heroisim at Dam Number One.

Monuments on site to the Battle of Dam 1

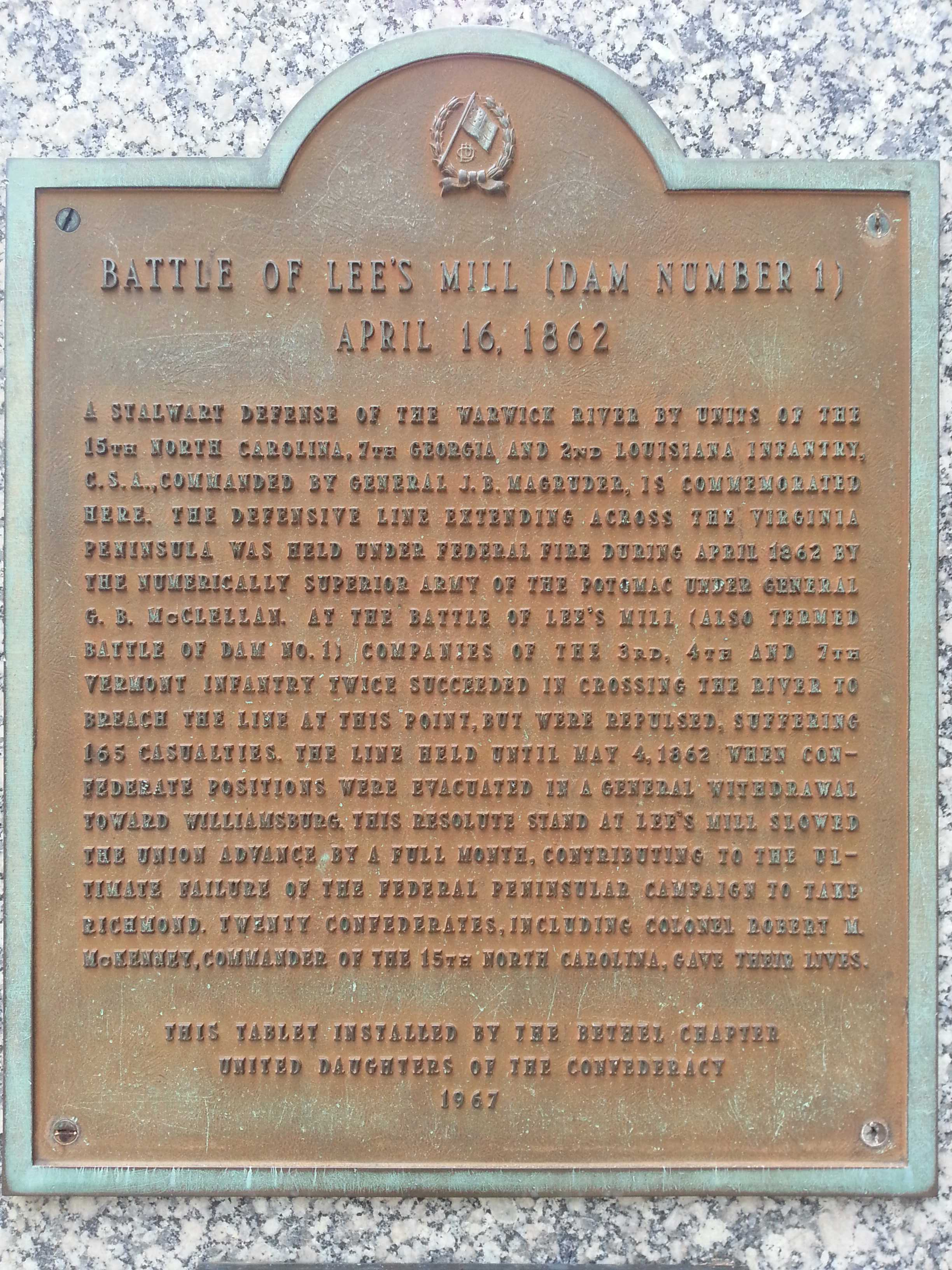
Dam No. One Battlefield Site Plaque 1

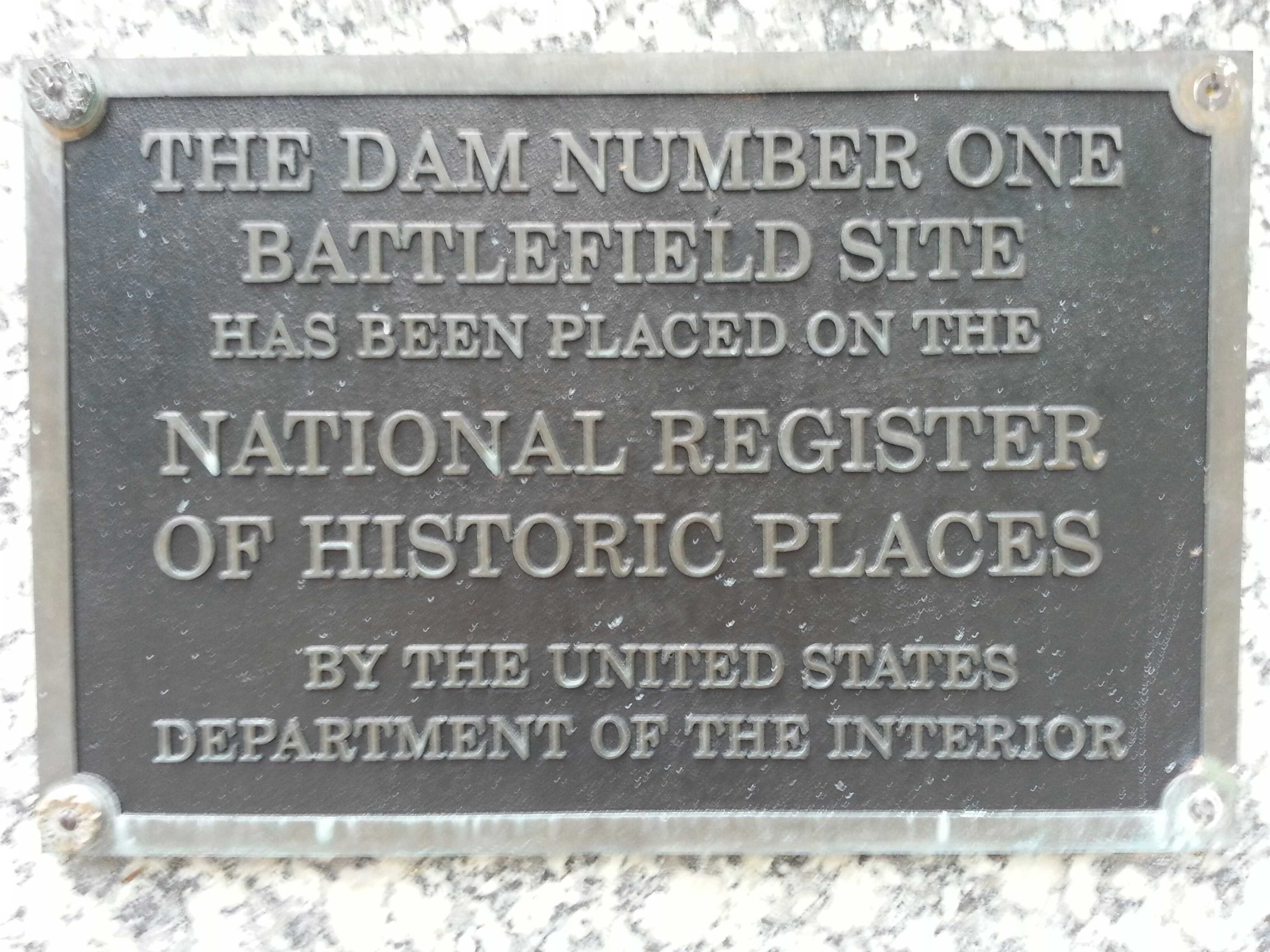
Dam No. One Battlefield Site Plaque 2

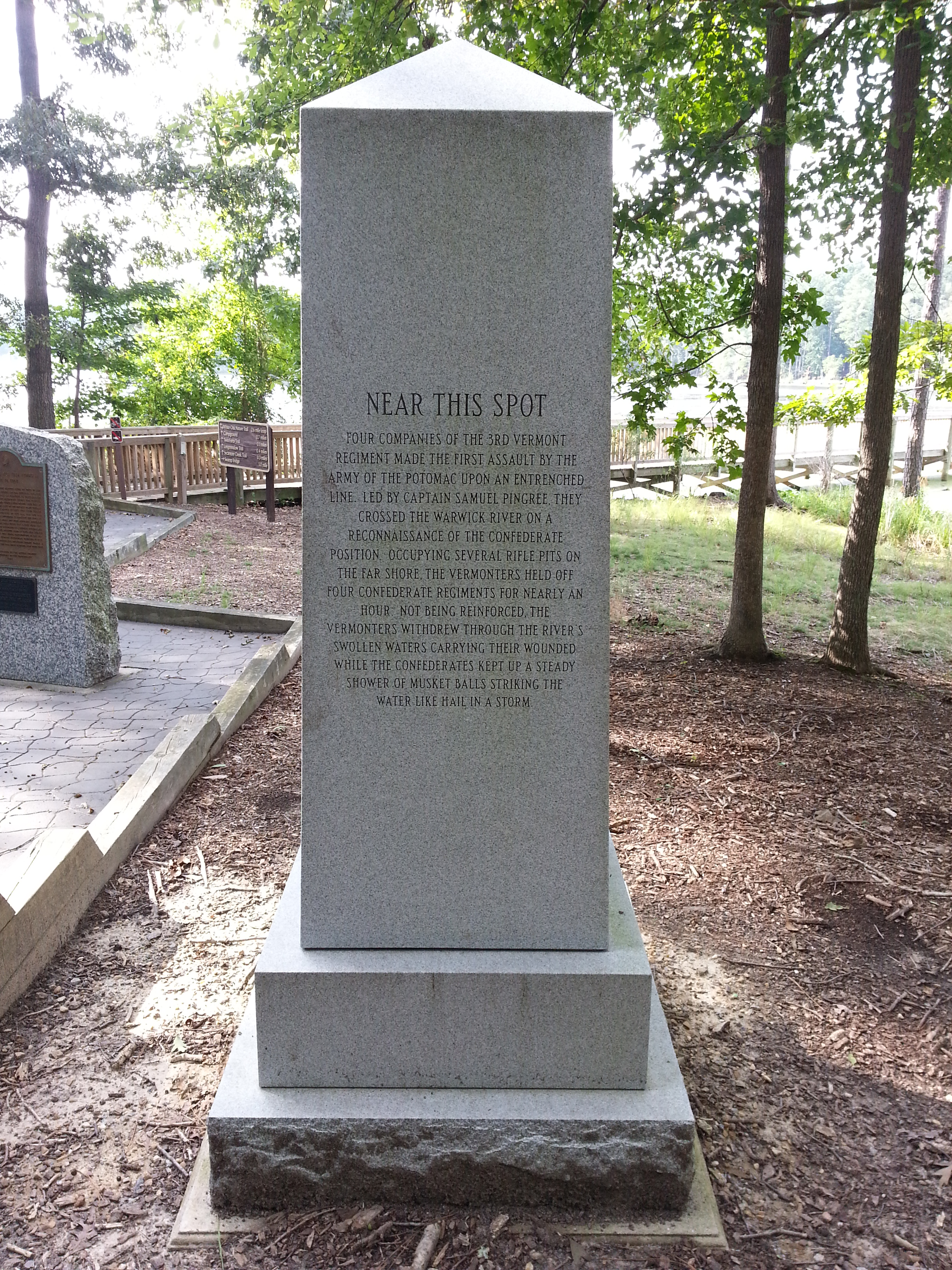
Dam No. One Battlefield Site Obelisk South Face

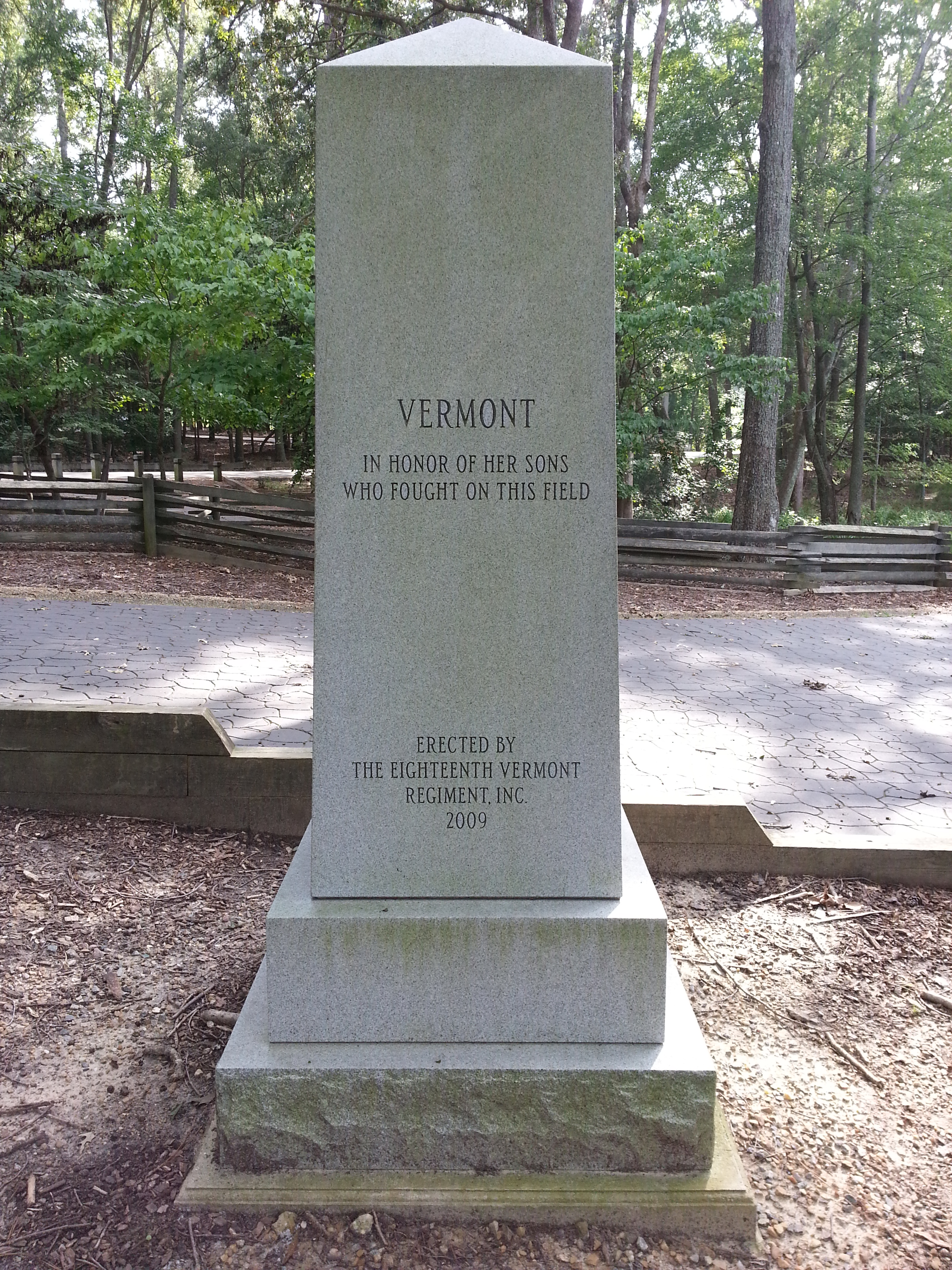
Dam No. One Battlefield Site Obelisk West Face

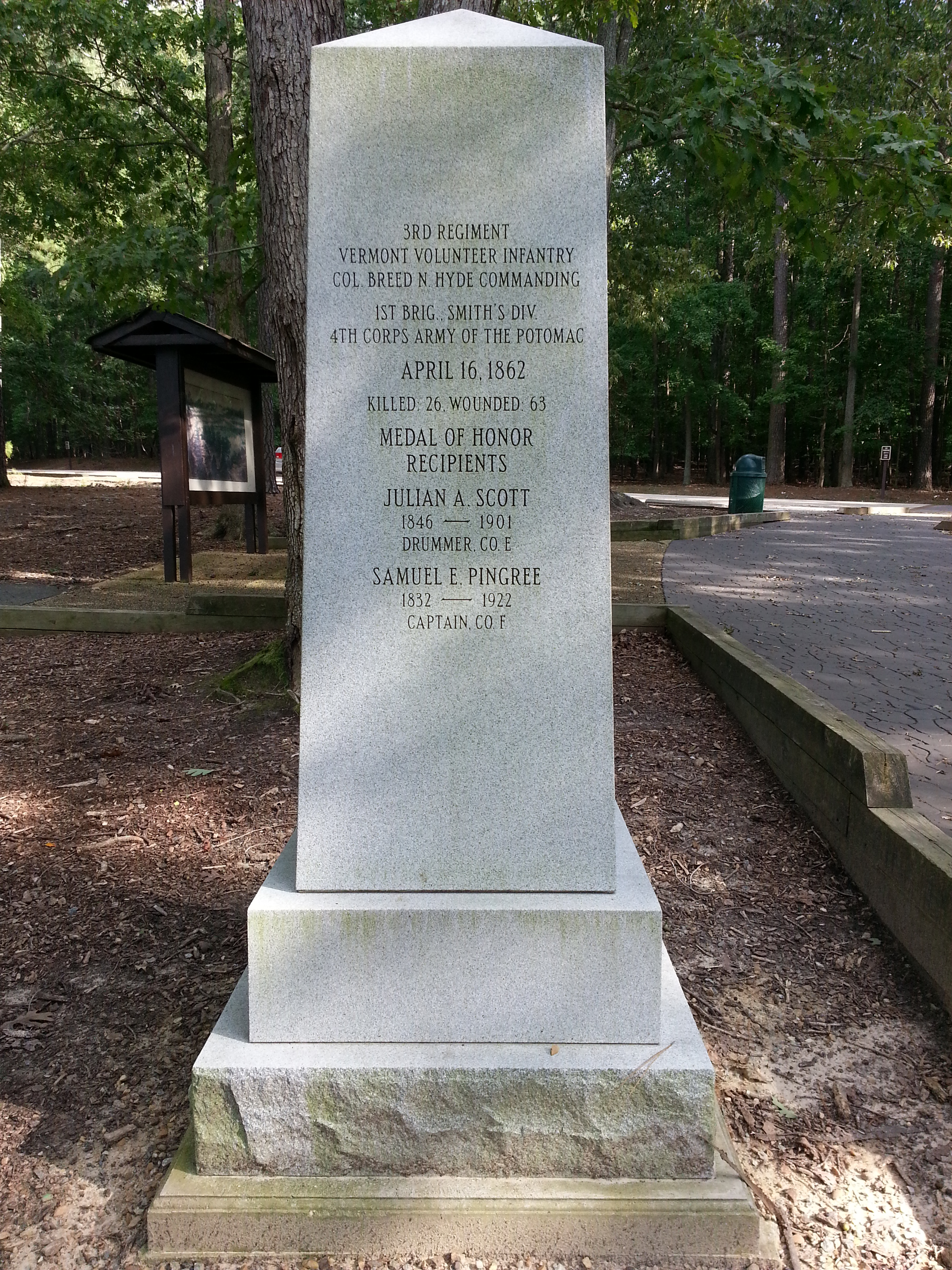
Dam No. One Battlefield Site Obelisk North Face

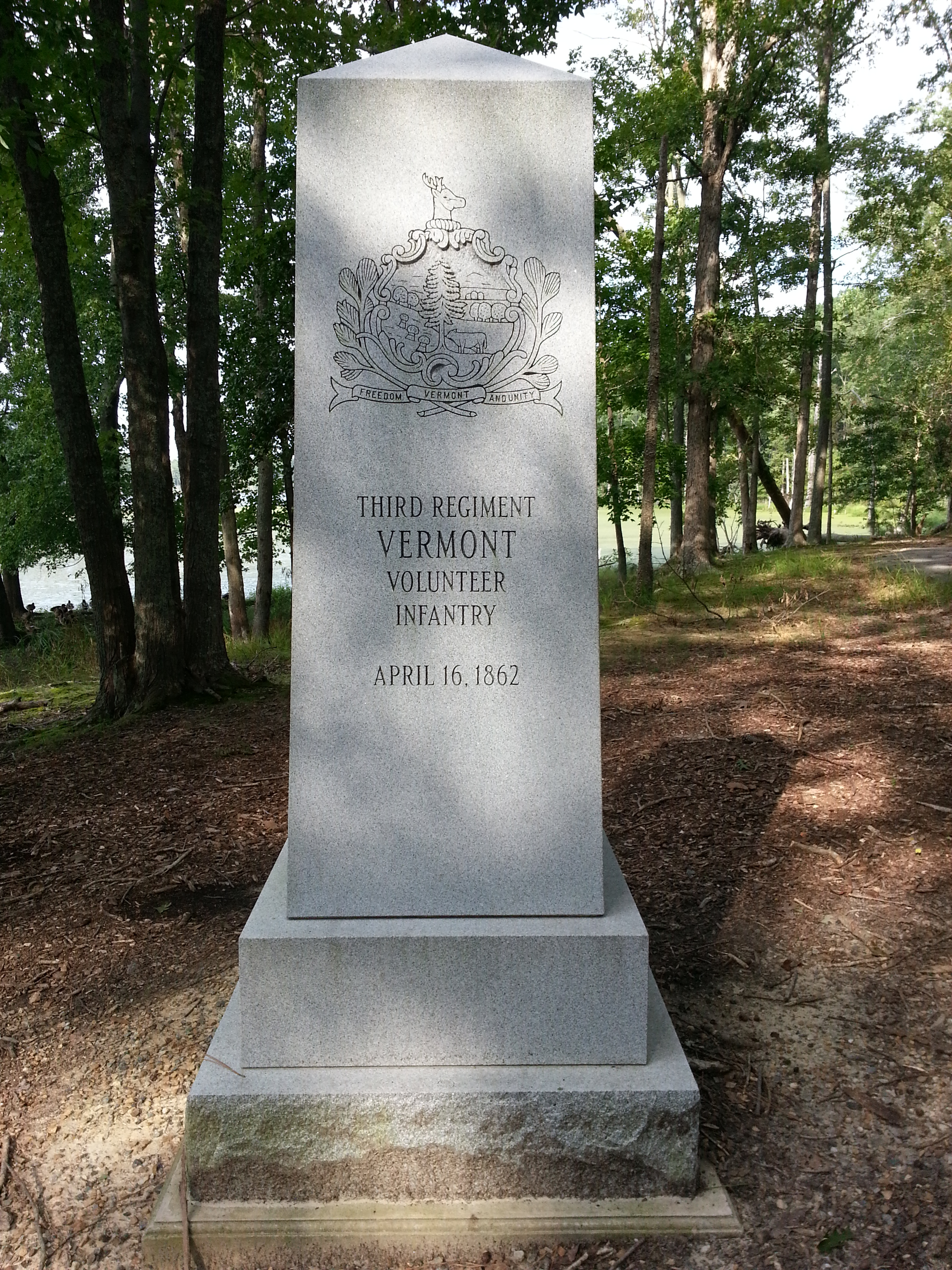
Dam No. One Battlefield Site Obelisk East Face

== Aftermath of Dam No. 1 ==
On the morning of April 17, it became obvious that no assault could be attempted at any point. At this point, McClellan acquiesced to conducting "regular approaches" and ordered parallels to be dug for heavy artillery. The siege preparations at Yorktown consisted of 15 batteries with more than 70 heavy guns, including two 200-pounder Parrotts and twelve 100-pounder Parrots, with the rest of the rifled pieces divided between 20-pounder and 30-pounder Parrotts and 4.5-inch (110 mm) Rodman siege rifles. These were augmented by 41 mortars, ranging in size from 8 inches (200 mm) to 13-inch (330 mm) seacoast mortars, which weighed over 10 tons and fired shells weighing 220 pounds (100 kg). When fired in unison, these batteries would deliver over 7,000 pounds (3,200 kg) of ordnance onto the enemy positions with each volley.

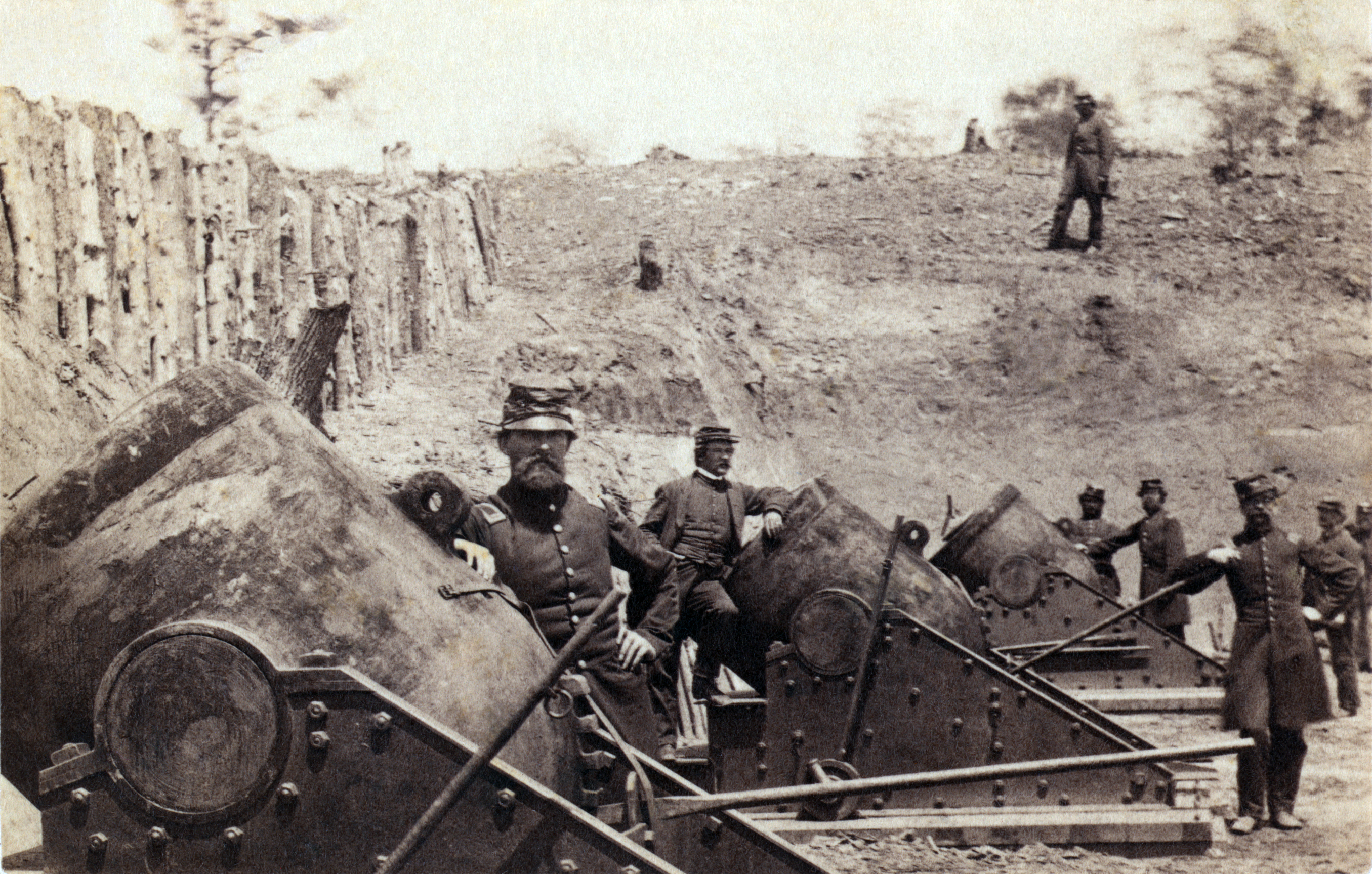
Union battery with 13-inch (330 mm) seacoast mortars, Model 1861, during siege of Yorktown, Virginia 1862

McClellan had not given up hope of turning Yorktown. The commander of the York River flotilla, Missroon, had consistently refused to even approach the Yorktown batteries, citing the weakness of his ship. However, on 16 April the USS Sebago joined the flotilla, and her captain promptly reported Missroon's "cowardice". Missroon attempted to delay further by stating he'd only attack Yorktown if the opposite fortress at Gloucester Point was destroyed first. McClellan gave him the newly arrived division of Franklin as a landing force, but Missroon kept finding reasons not to land them. Finally, on 30 April Missroon was relieved and replaced by Commander William Smith. Smith promptly closed with the Yorktown batteries and bombarded them. This would precipitate Johnston's retreat.

For the remainder of April, the Confederates, now at ca. 72,000 effectives and under the direct command of Johnston, improved their defenses while McClellan undertook the laborious process of transporting and placing massive siege artillery batteries, which he planned to deploy on May 5. This would be followed by an assault by six divisions against "The Divide", a fortified line containing two forts (named the Red Redoubt and the White Redoubt) linked by continual trenchline between the head of the Warwick and the main fortress of Yorktown.

To Johnston, the naval bombardment of 30 April, and the initial Federal bombardment by the siege guns on 1 May were a signal that time was up. Johnston sent his supply train (which was small, because Yorktown was being supplied by water) in the direction of Richmond on May 3. That evening the rebels expended as much ordnance as possible to discourage pursuit, and when the last rebel infantry was clear, leaving booby traps and land mines in their works, the gunners set long fuses on the remaining powder and joined the retreat.

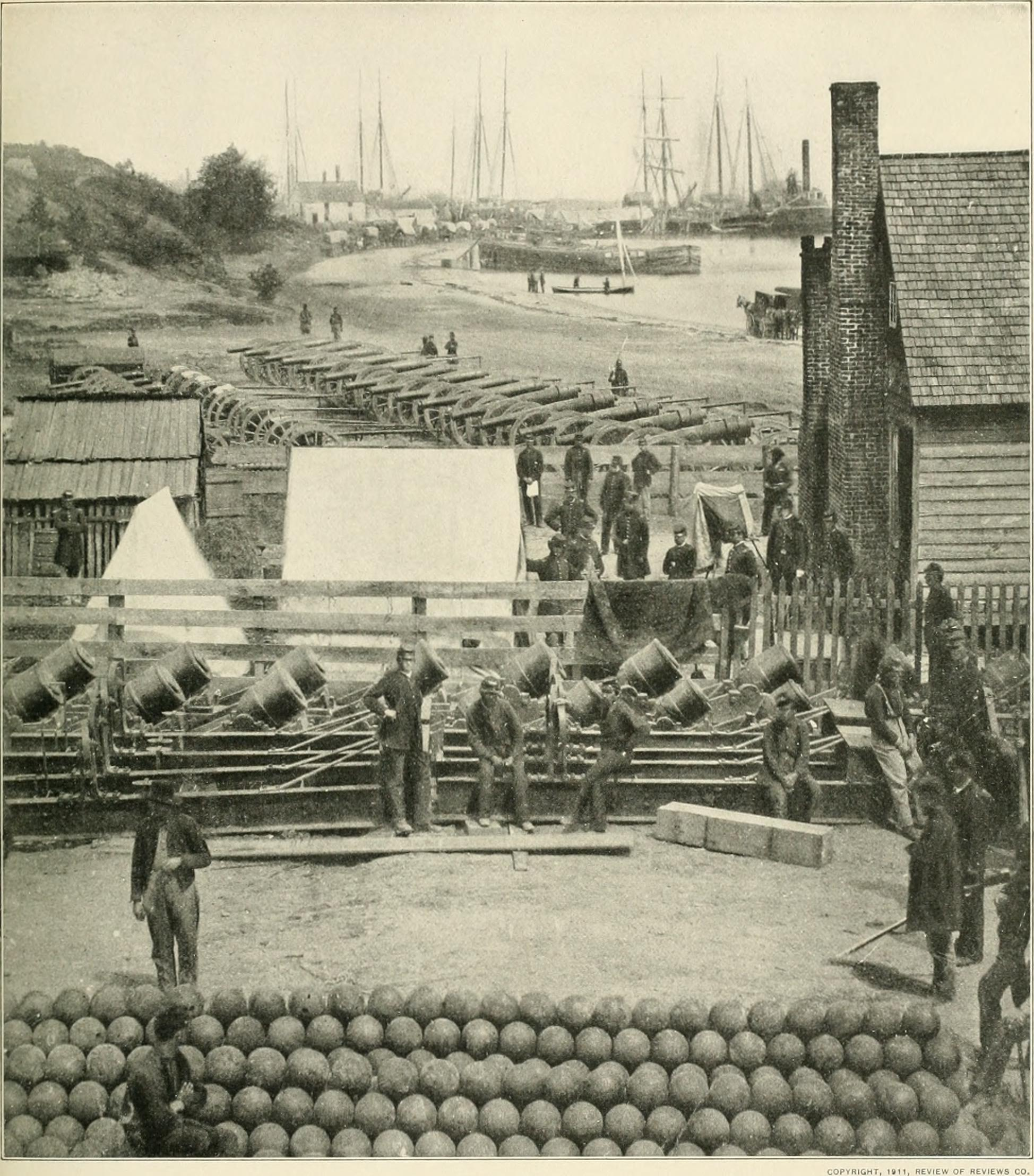
McClellan's guns and gunners near the lower wharf at Yorktown after the Confederate evacuation

Sometime after midnight on 4 May, two escaped slaves approached Hancock's brigade. They said the rebels were withdrawing. Hancock sent the message to Smith, who was awoken at 2 a.m. with this information, which was followed immediately by Lt. George Custer reporting he'd seen the same from a balloon. Still groggy, Smith sent the messenger up to Keyes, and ordered the pickets to investigate at dawn. Custer was not satisfied with this and rode forward to Brookes's Vermont Brigade and told him. He immediately woke his brigade and set them in place to make a dawn attack, and at 5:30 a.m. the Vermonters seized the fortifications they'd been repelled by on 16 April. Keyes's message apparently did not arrive until well into the morning.

Meanwhile, sometime between 3:15 and 4:00 a.m., General Jameson, the General of the Trenches for the day, was informed that there were explosions in Yorktown and picket firing. He woke General Porter, the Director of the Siege, with the information. Porter looked through at Yorktown and dismissed the rumour that the rebels were retreating. However, at 4:30 a.m. three rebel soldiers surrendered to the Federals and were brought to Jameson. He went back to Porter who this time accepted the information, ordering that reconissances be immediately sent out and for several regiments to occupy Yorktown at dawn.

At 5:30 a.m., the news reached McClellan's HQ. Awoken by the news he then telegraphed Sumner, Smith and Porter to push forward and ascertain the truth of the matter. Other news soon came in, and McClellan ordered a general pursuit. He sent cavalry under Brig. Gen. George Stoneman in pursuit and ordered Brig. Gen. William B. Franklin's division to reboard Navy transports, sail up the York River, and cut off Johnson's retreat. The stage was set for the subsequent Battle of Williamsburg and Battle of Eltham's Landing.

== Battlefield preservation ==
The Civil War Trust (a division of the American Battlefield Trust) and its partners have acquired and preserved 6 acres (0.024 km^{2}) of the Lee's Mill section of the battlefield.
