= Kingsmill, Virginia =

Kingsmill is a geographic area in James City County, Virginia, that includes a large planned residential community, a resort complex, a theme park, a brewery, and a commercial park.

The Kingsmill area is between the north bank of the James River just east (downstream) of the site where the first permanent English settlement in North America at Jamestown was established in 1607 and Interstate Highway 64. Highway access to most of the area's businesses and attractions is from U.S. Route 60 between the eastern city limits of Williamsburg and the adjacent community of Grove, or from Virginia State Route 199, which forms a semi-circular beltway of sorts around Williamsburg's southern side.

== History ==
=== Kingsmill Plantation ===
- Kingsmill Plantation
- U.S. National Register of Historic Places
- U.S. Historic district
- Virginia Landmarks Register
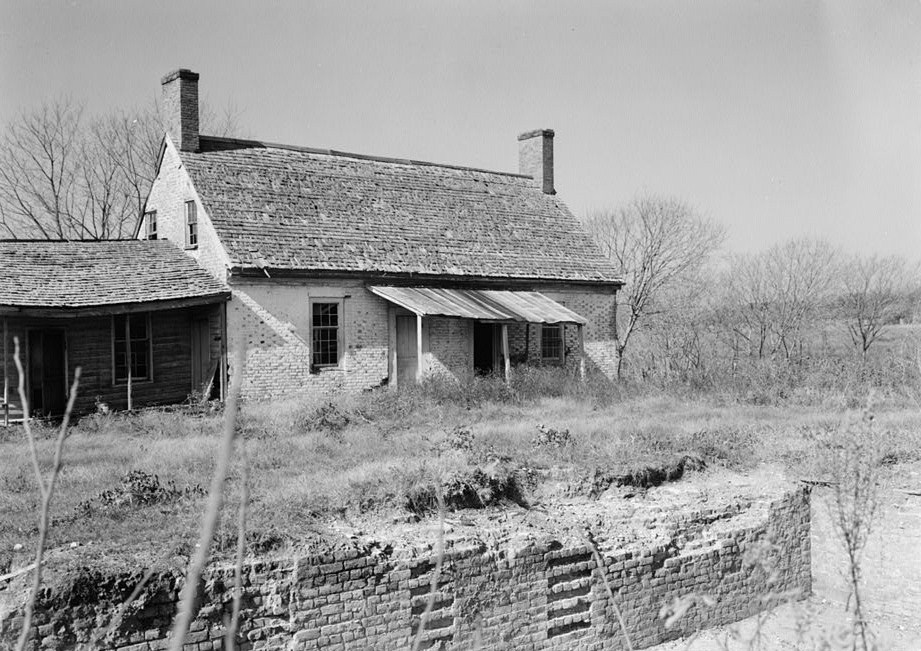
- Kingsmill Plantation Dependency

- Location within Virginia Location within the United States
- Nearest city: Williamsburg, Virginia
- Coordinates: 37°13′37″N 76°40′46″W
- Area: 135 acres (55 ha)
- Built: 1680
- NRHP reference No.: 72001401
- VLR No.: 047-0010

Significant dates
- Added to NRHP: April 26, 1972
- Designated VLR: March 21, 1972

A prominent member of the Virginia Company, Richard Kingsmill, became the namesake of the Kingsmill Plantation. The Virginia Company was a for-profit organization chartered in England which was charged with the founding and settlement of Virginia under the reign of King James I. Richard Kingsmill was given one of the first land grants of 300 acres (1.2 km^{2}) in the southwest area of what later became a much larger plantation. Elizabeth Kingsmill married Col William Tayloe and he inherited the land from her father. After his death in 1655, the administrator for his estate Col William Tayloe sold 1,200 acres to Lewis Burwell II in 1693. In the mid-1730s, British Colonel Lewis Burwell III established a 1,400-acre (5.7 km^{2}) plantation which he named Kingsmill Plantation. It included a mansion, outbuildings and garden. He was the colonial customs inspector for the upper James River. Along the river, Burwell's Landing, site of his inspection station, also featured a tavern, storehouse, warehouse, and ferry house. Quarterpath Road extended between Burwell's Landing and Williamsburg.

The Kingsmill area saw action during the American Revolutionary War. During most of the 19th century, the house was owned by several related men named William Allen, who also owned plantations in Surry County, as well as Curles Neck downriver in Henrico County. The Kingsmill manor house burned in 1843, before William Allen had reached legal age and shortly before his mother had purchased nearby Jamestown Island on his behalf. A Confederate sympathizer and perhaps the wealthiest man in Virginia in 1860, he continued to operate the plantation using enslaved labor, but by the terms of his inheritance, was required to preserve the property for his eldest son. Only the office and the kitchen still stand; they are among the earliest brick dependencies still extant in Virginia.

=== American Civil War ===
Action during the American Civil War (1861–65) also skirted Kingsmill Plantation lands. In 1862, Union troops under Major General George B. McClellan engaged in a failed attempt to seize the Confederate capital of Richmond. Slowly and carefully, much to the frustration of U.S. President Abraham Lincoln, McClellan assembled huge naval forces and a massive siege train of land-based troops, arms and supplies around a staging area based at the union stronghold of Fort Monroe at the tip of the Virginia Peninsula, where the harbor of Hampton Roads had been under federal control via siege for about a year already.

Forces under McClellan for what has become known as the Peninsula Campaign dwarfed all previous American expeditions at the time, transporting 121,500 men, 44 artillery batteries, 1,150 wagons, over 15,000 horses, and tons of equipment and supplies. An English observer remarked that it was the "stride of a giant."

McClellan's plan initially was to utilize the James and York rivers, especially the former, which was known to be navigable to Richmond, in combination with his land-based forces, to attack simultaneously and overwhelm the unknown resources of the rebels at Richmond. However, even as several months were spent through the winter of 1862 training new troops and bringing these many Union assets into position, the portion of the scheme which depended upon control of the James River ran into trouble. In March, the Battle of Hampton Roads between the first ironclad warships took place. Although the conflict between the two ships was inconclusive, the new technologies were to change naval warfare dramatically, and control of the harbor of Hampton Roads was brought into serious question.

Although the Union never lost control of the entrance to the harbor, and was able to retake Norfolk and Norfolk Naval Shipyard at Portsmouth shortly thereafter, Union ships were unable to move past heavily defended Drewry's Bluff east of Richmond along the James River. It appeared unlikely that situation would improve. McClellan realized that his plan to take Richmond would almost certainly depend upon his land forces alone.

In early April 1862, McClellan's massive siege train began moving cautiously westerly up the Peninsula toward the Confederate citadel. Throughout the campaign, McClellan was convinced (erroneously) that he was facing much larger opposing forces than he was. At times, he even estimated these forces to greatly outnumber his own, frequently and bitterly complaining to Lincoln (his Commander-in-Chief), who had withheld from McClellan a much smaller force of federal troops to maintain a defensive position around Washington, D.C.

The Confederate strategy of the early portion of the Peninsula Campaign became one of delays, providing vital time for defenses to be built outside Richmond. The advancing Union forces were confronted with a series of three defensive lines erected across the Peninsula, which were manned primarily by greatly outnumbered forces led by General John B. Magruder. The first, about 12 miles (19 km) north of Fort Monroe, contained infantry outposts and artillery redoubts, but was insufficiently manned to prevent any Union advance. Its primary purpose was to prevent the Union from learning much about the second line. Known as the Warwick Line, this second, and by far largest of the three defensive lines, was about a dozen miles east of Williamsburg, along the Warwick River. It was anchored by Yorktown on the north and Mulberry Island on the south. It consisted of redoubts, rifle pits, and fortifications behind the Warwick River. By enlarging two dams on the river, the Confederates developed the river as a significant military obstacle in its own right. The third defensive line was a series of forts just east of Williamsburg, which waited unmanned for use by the army if it had to fall back from Yorktown.

Although greatly outnumbered, defenders along the first and second lines under former thespian "Prince" John Magruder took advantage of the poor visibility due to the seasonally heavy undergrowth of the naturally-wooded and swampy terrain. They used elaborate ruse tactics and guerrilla raids to intimidate McClellan and his leaders into thinking they were facing far larger forces, which increased their caution and greatly slowed their progress westward. Stephen Sears, the author of the To The Gates of Richmond, described Magruder's having his troops march back and forth behind the lines with great fanfare to appear to be a larger force, as "performances of the Prince John Players." Magruder's efforts appeared successful, as the ever-cautious McClellan moved very slowly with his forces. These were substantially larger than those of the Confederate defenders, even when the latter were reinforced by the arrival of the Army of Northern Virginia under General Joseph E. Johnston. Meanwhile, the Confederates built their long defensive line outside Richmond.

While there were several armed conflicts with loss of life, after finally overtaking the first line and meeting minimal resistance, McClellan chose to carefully amass his troops and plan a major offensive, taking the better part of 30 days to do so. He had huge cannons brought up the York River by ship and installed in a position favorable for his planned assault of Yorktown. The night before McClellan was finally positioned to launch his major offensive against Warwick Line, the Confederate troops quietly withdrew and retreated toward Richmond via Williamsburg. Discovering only empty works and Quaker gun in the abandoned fortifications on May 3, McClellan sent his cavalry racing after the escaping Confederates. He also loaded a division of infantry aboard ships to sail up the York River to the west in an attempt to outflank the Confederates' apparent retreat toward Richmond.

Only two roads led from the abandoned Warwick Line to be used by the massive equipment and numerous troops of the Union siege train in pursuing the fleeing Confederates, who had a head start. These were the Williamsburg-Yorktown Road and the Williamsburg-Lee's Mill Road. They converged about 1-mile (1.6 km) east of Williamsburg. The weather had been rainy, and both armies slogged along the dirt roads of the sandy terrain. These undoubtedly became deeper in mud and more difficult to traverse.

The Williamsburg Line was the third line of defensive fortifications across the Peninsula. It was anchored by College Creek, a tributary of the James River, on the south and Queen's Creek, a tributary of the York River on the north. Under the leadership of local planter Benjamin S. Ewell, president of the College of William and Mary, a series of 14 redoubts were built along the line. Named Fort Magruder, Redoubt Number 6, was the center of the convergence of the roads from Yorktown and Lee's Mill. It was shaped as an elongated pentagon, with walls 15 feet (4.6 m) high and nine feet thick. The earthworks were protected by a dry moat nine feet deep. It mounted eight guns. Several of the redoubts were just east of the Quarterpath Road, which lead from Williamsburg to the landing for Kingsmill Plantation on the James River.

Despite the significant head start of the southern forces, cavalry forces from each side met, and began skirmishing on May 4. Union General George Stoneman's cavalry encountered and began skirmishing with Brig. Gen. J.E.B. Stuart's cavalry, the Confederate's rearguard. Learning of this, and frustrated by the slow progress of his own forces which were passing through Williamsburg, Confederate General Joseph E. Johnston detached a portion of his troops to confront the advancing Union troops. On May 5, 1862, the single-day Battle of Williamsburg took place. During the day, several groups of Union troops battled with Confederates near the Williamsburg line, with much of the action at or near Fort Magruder. Confederate casualties, including the cavalry skirmishing on May 4, were 1,682. Union casualties were 2,283.

Although McClellan claimed a Union victory in his reports, and he took the Williamsburg Line within slightly more than 24 hours, most historians rate the Battle of Williamsburg as a Confederate victory. The Williamsburg Line had served its intended purpose. The primary goal of the defenders had been to enable the retreat of the main Confederate force to the defenses of Richmond, and this was accomplished.

Those Union forces sent up the York River by McClellan met limited success in stopping fleeing rebels. Their conflict on May 7 became known as the Battle of Eltham's Landing. That conflict in New Kent County was little more than a heavy skirmish, resulting in 194 Union casualties and 48 Confederate. The remaining battles of McClellan's campaign were fought either outside the gates of Richmond or during his later retreat to the protection of the Union Navy at Harrison's Landing (better known in modern times as Berkley Plantation).

In the areas along the Williamsburg Line, including the Quarterpath Road north of modern-day Virginia State Route 199 and along U.S. Route 60, portions of the redoubts were preserved. This includes the core of Fort Magruder (in James City County on today's Penniman Road). Several additional preserved redoubts remain along the Colonial Parkway north of Fort Magruder.

=== Williamsburg: the closest center of commerce ===
Located along a ridge of higher ground along the Virginia Peninsula midway between the York and James rivers, Williamsburg had been established in the early 17th century as a fortified settlement known as Middle Plantation. During the American Revolutionary War, under the leadership of Virginia Governor Thomas Jefferson, the capital of Virginia was relocated many miles inland to Richmond, at the fall line on the James River.

Although the Quarterpath Road led to the James River at Burwell's Landing, (as did the old Jamestown Road), to reach the landings and the river were significant distances in the era before railroads or motor vehicles. Also, in differing directions by land from Williamsburg, and at a shorter distance, persons could get to other landings on the College Creek or Queen's Creek, which led to the very navigable portions of the James and York rivers, respectively. The distances to navigable water from Williamsburg were obstacles that inhibited trade and put the town into lesser position compared to communities with better water access.

An early plan to establish a relatively short canal to enable shipping to Williamsburg from either or both of the navigable waterways a dozen or less miles nearby was initiated. Some construction was undertaken, but was never completed. The proposed canal instead became a little-known footnote in Williamsburg's history.

As the town did not have ready access to a major waterway nor transportation pathway, throughout the formative years of the United States, Williamsburg did not develop as a major center of commerce of any great significance. For at least 140 years after 1781, Williamsburg was best known as the home of the often struggling College of William and Mary (established by Royal Charter by England's only joint monarchy in 1693). It also had the first mental asylum in what became the United States, a pioneering institution which modern successor became known as Eastern State Hospital. Williamsburg seemed somewhat forgotten and "passed by," and was the subject of occasional humor along those lines. On June 26, 1912, the Richmond Times-Dispatch newspaper ran an editorial which dubbed the town 'Lotusburg' for "Tuesday was election day in Williamsburg but nobody remembered it. The clerk forgot to wake the electoral board, the electoral board could not arouse itself long enough to have the ballots printed, the candidates forgot they were running, the voters forgot they were alive."

==== Railroad era ====
In the early 1880s, through the vision and efforts of railroad builder and industrialist Collis P. Huntington and his associates, the Chesapeake and Ohio Railway (C&O) had been extended from Richmond through Williamsburg to reach Newport News Point, at the confluence of the James and the Elizabeth rivers in Warwick County, where coal shipping facilities were established. Soon, a town quickly developed as the City of Newport News in 1896. A great shipyard, which became Newport News Shipbuilding and Drydock Company was also established there.

The railroad had been built primarily as a transportation line to enable shipping of bituminous coal from the rich coalfields of southwestern Virginia and southern West Virginia. But it also connected Williamsburg, as well as James City and Warwick counties, with the expanding transcontinental railroads of the country. Passenger and freight services were provided, and stations were built along the line, including one at Grove Station, a few miles north and east of Kingsmill near the adjacent Carter's Grove Plantation at Grove, Virginia.

Carter's Grove Plantation and Carter's Grove Wharf were the next major feature immediately east of Kingsmill along the north bank of the James River. Carter's Grove was still an active plantation in the early 20th century, but the Kingsmill Plantation and surrounding properties had fallen into ruins and disuse. With much of it primarily both wooded and hilly, the land at Kingsmill was not particularly well-suited to agriculture. It stood largely vacant and unused as major changes began at Williamsburg and the nearby region beginning in 1926.

=== Colonial Williamsburg created ===
In the first half of the 20th century, much of the property in the area of the old Kingsmill Plantation was acquired by Standard Oil heir John D. Rockefeller Jr. and his associates and by Colonial Williamsburg.

Championed initially by the Reverend Dr. W.A.R. Goodwin, who was affiliated with both Bruton Parish Church (which he helped restore in 1907 in time for the Jamestown Exposition), and working with the College of William and Mary's president at the time, J.A.C. Chandler, the Colonial Williamsburg project was funded and endowed by John D. Rockefeller Jr., along with his wife, Abby Aldrich Rockefeller. The Rockefellers officially developed Colonial Williamsburg to celebrate the patriots and the early history of the United States. Many of the missing Colonial structures were reconstructed on their original sites during the 1930s. Others were restored to estimates of 18th-century appearance, with traces of later buildings and improvements removed. Dependency structures and animals add to the ambiance. Most buildings are open for tourists, with the exception of buildings serving as residences for Colonial Williamsburg employees.

Notable structures include the Capitol and the Governor's Palace, each recreated and landscaped as to what is known of their late 18th-century condition, as well as Bruton Parish Church and the Raleigh Tavern. The Wren Building on the campus of William and Mary was one of the first buildings to be restored.

The Rockefellers had many homes in New York and Maine. However, it was not long before the couple came to regard Williamsburg as their favorite and the town as one in which they felt "at home" according to statements to that effect made by their children and grandchildren. This is also evidenced by many of their actions as well as those of their family and other members of the patriarch of the Rockefeller family who have continued the sentiment. Their love and concern for the citizenry of the area may be shown in many ways which extend beyond the principal missions and direct accomplishments of Colonial Williamsburg.

Notable among these was Abby's efforts to facilitate educational opportunities for persons of African-American heritage during a very difficult period for such efforts in Virginia, notably her role with the establishment of the Bruton Heights School complex, which went far to equalize educational opportunities for blacks in the Greater Williamsburg community many years before judicial rulings and governmental mandates brought similar efforts elsewhere.

At the urging of Dr. Goodwin, John and Abby Rockefeller made their home at Bassett Hall, between the northern end of the historic Quarterpath Road and the southeastern edge of the Historic District. Their funds helped acquire vast tracts of land throughout the area, including property which extended east to include the old Kingsmill Plantation. It has been said that they had dreams of acquiring one of the old working James River plantations still extant in their lifetimes, but that goal eluded them.

In the late 1920s Rockefeller had attempted to acquire Shirley, long the seat of the Carter family, halfway between Richmond and Williamsburg, that he felt was the ideal plantation with which to supplement the historical messages of the colonial capital he was restoring. Though its owners were much reduced in circumstances, the plantation wasn't for sale. The Carters did, however, agree, in 1928, to sell a Charles Willson Peale portrait of General Washington that they owned to Rockefeller for the sum of $75,000 (equal to approximately $1 million in 2015).

After Abby and John D. Rockefeller Jr. had each died, beginning in the 1960s, their son Winthrop Rockefeller served as chairman of the Colonial Williamsburg Foundation. He was also governor of the state of Arkansas. During his dual tenures, he became aware of an opportunity to acquire Carter's Grove Plantation, adjacent to Colonial Williamsburg's extensive holdings near the old Kingsmill Plantation lands, and still extant as both a home and working farm. Also established by a Burwell (in 1755), Carter's Grove had most recently been owned since 1928 by Pittsburgh industrialist Archibald McCrea and his wife Mary "Mollie" Corling (Johnston) Dunlop McCrea, originally of Petersburg. It was purchased from her estate by an arm of the Rockefeller Foundation and eventually transferred to the Colonial Williamsburg Foundation. For many years during Winthrop's tenure, Carter's Grove was used to host dignitaries visiting Colonial Williamsburg, as well as enable archaeological research as well as host some public presentations for Colonial Williamsburg patrons.

Additionally, while serving as both Governor of Arkansas and chairman of Colonial Williamsburg, Winthrop learned that Anheuser-Busch head August Busch, II was considering establishing a brewery and possibly other developmental investments in eastern Virginia. While the details are unknown publicly, he and Busch apparently collaborated on a deal which resulted in the brewing conglomerate's development of diversified activities in the Williamsburg area, which grew to include not only the brewery, but the Busch Gardens Williamsburg theme park, and Kingsmill Resort, the Kingsmill on the James residential planned community, and several large commercial parks. To help negotiate the deal, the land which had once been Kingsmill Plantation was made available for purchase. Along with the later acquisition of smaller nearby water park, the A-B developments this fostered in the Williamsburg community generated thousands of new jobs and millions of dollars of new tax revenues.

Both Winthrop Rockefeller, who died in 1973, and August Busch II, who died in 1989 have been credited by some historians with helping develop the Greater Williamsburg area into one of the top tourism destinations in the world. They apparently felt that augmenting the attractions of the Historic Triangle of Colonial Virginia (Jamestown, Colonial Williamsburg, and Yorktown) with other attractions would help draw future families to the region, as well as help balance out the local economy, stimulate the hospitality industry (restaurants and lodging), and add employment opportunities.

Due to operational logistics, Carter's Grove Plantation was eventually sold (with restrictive covenants regarding use and future development) by Colonial Williamsburg. The global economy also eventually resulted in A-B setting out to divest its theme parks, the resort and other developments to new ownership.

== 21st century: Kingsmill area ==
As of 2013, Colonial Williamsburg and the developments initiated by the Rockefellers and Busch family, continued to provide Williamsburg, James City County, and much of the surrounding area with a substantial base of employment and economic activity.

Major Kingsmill area developments include:

- Busch Gardens Williamsburg theme park
- Quarterland Commons Commercial Park
- Kingsmill Resort golf resort
- Kingsmill on the James planned community (Notable and/or notorious residents have included Curtis Strange, Donald Regan, Marv Levy, and John W. Hinckley Jr.)
