= McLaws =

McLaws is a surname. Notable people with the surname include:

- David McLaws, Canadian politician
- Lafayette McLaws (1821–1897), United States Army officer and Confederate general
- Mary-Louise McLaws (1953–2023), Australian epidemiologist
- Shawn McLaws (born 1993), American soccer player
- Virginia Randall McLaws (1872–1967), American painter and educator

== See also ==
- McLaws Circle
