= 15th Virginia Infantry Regiment =

- Regimental flag
- Active: May 1861 – Spring 1865
- Disbanded: April 1865
- Country: Confederacy
- Allegiance: Confederate States of America
- Branch: Confederate States Army
- Type: Infantry
- Engagements: First Battle of Bull Run; Seven Days' Battles; Second Battle of Bull Run; Battle of Antietam; Battle of Fredericksburg; Siege of Suffolk; Battle of Cold Harbor; Siege of Petersburg; Battle of Five Forks; Battle of Sailor's Creek

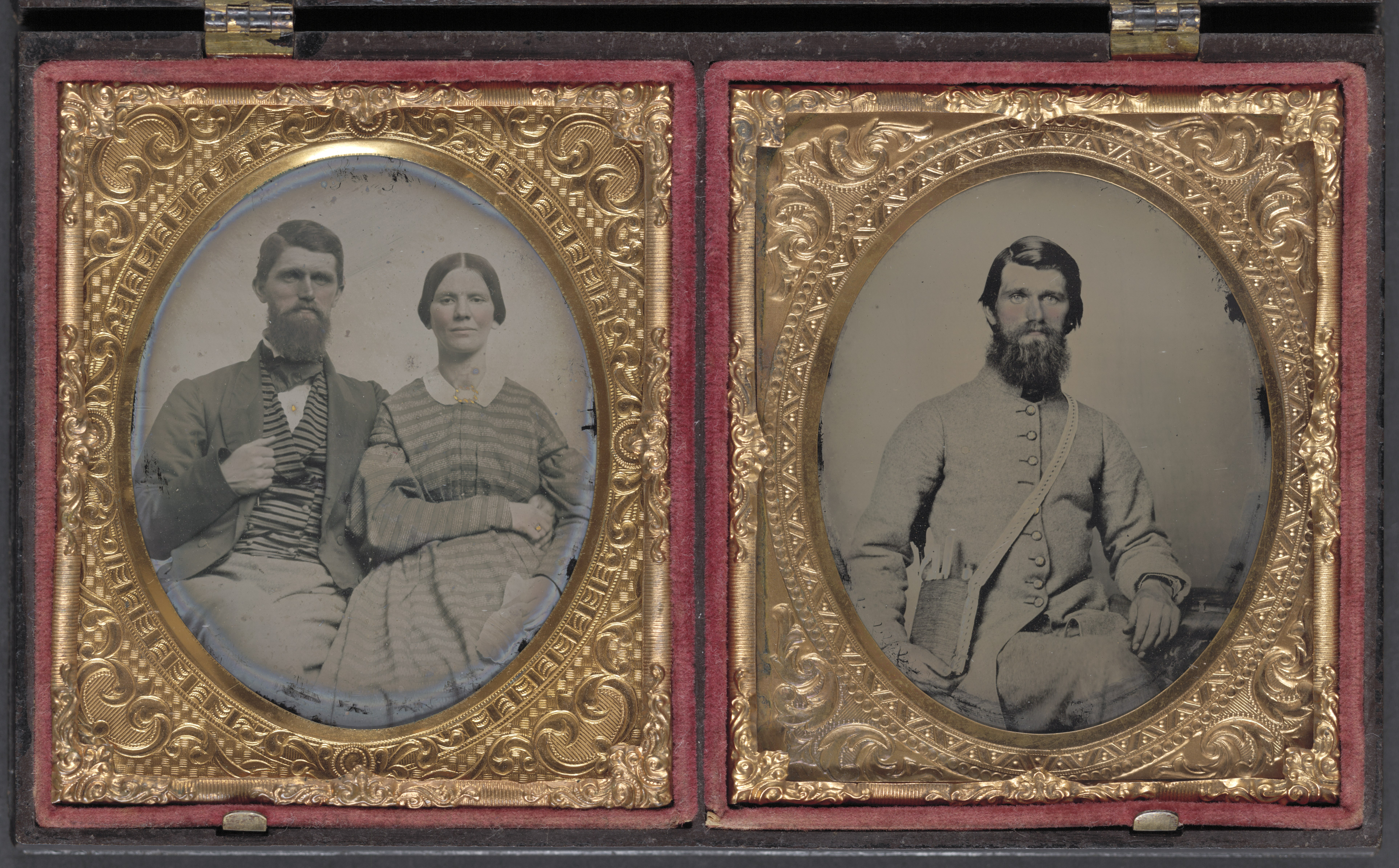
Dr. Alexander Harris of 15th Virginia Infantry Regiment in uniform and Dr. Harris with his wife after the war

The 15th Virginia Infantry Regiment was an infantry regiment raised in Virginia for service in the Confederate States Army during the American Civil War. It fought mostly with the Army of Northern Virginia.

15th Virginia was organized in May 1861, with men from Richmond and Henrico and Hanover counties. The regiment was brigaded under McLaws, Semmes, and Corse, Army of Northern Virginia.

It fought with the army from the Seven Days' Battles to Fredericksburg, then was involved in Longstreet's Suffolk Expedition. During the Gettysburg campaign, the 15th was on detached duty, and after serving in Tennessee and North Carolina participated in the battles at Drewry's Bluff and Cold Harbor. Later it took its place in the Petersburg trenches north and south of the James River and ended the war at Appomattox.

This unit contained 476 effectives in April, 1862, reported 1 killed and 8 wounded at Malvern Hill, and lost fifty-nine percent of the 128 engaged at Sharpsburg. Many were captured at Sayler's Creek, and on April 9, 1865, it surrendered with 69 officers and men.

The field officers were Colonel Thomas P. August; Lieutenant Colonels James R. Crenshaw, Emmett M. Morrison, Thomas G. Peyton, and St. George Tucker; and Majors C.H. Clarke and John S. Walker.

== See also ==
- List of Virginia Civil War units
