= Busch Properties, Inc. =

American property corporation

Busch Properties, Inc. (BPI) is a real estate development company established in 1969 as a subsidiary of Anheuser-Busch, Inc. (AB), a St. Louis, Missouri beer brewer, which is of the largest in the United States. BPI's four main functions include business park development, resort and residential development, corporate real estate and employee residential relocation for the parent company and other AB subsidiaries.

Busch Properties primarily develops and manages properties located on land near the parent company's brewery facilities, such as the 250-acre (1.0 km^{2}) Busch Corporate Center adjacent to the company's St. Louis brewery.

Notable among BPI developments were the Kingsmill Resort, the Kingsmill planned community residential development, Busch Office Park at McLaws Circle, and Busch Commerce Park, all located near the company's brewery in James City County near Williamsburg, Virginia. Busch Entertainment, another AB subsidiary, operated the Busch Gardens Williamsburg and Water Country USA theme parks nearby the James City brewery as well.

In 2009, the company announced that it would no longer operate Kingsmill. Along with the October 2009 sale of SeaWorld, Busch Gardens Williamsburg, Water Country USA and eight other theme park to Blackstone Group, the company's portfolio was reduced significantly.

In July 2010, it was announced that Busch Properties had entered into an agreement with Xanterra Parks and Resorts to purchase and operate the Kingsmill Resort.
