= Quarterpath Road =

Quarterpath Road is one of the oldest roads in James City County and the independent city of Williamsburg, Virginia.

== History ==
=== Colonial era ===
Established in the 17th century, Quarterpath Road extended from Middle Plantation (renamed Williamsburg in 1699) through what later became Kingsmill Plantation to Burwell's Landing on the James River, a few miles east of Jamestown. The Burwells were among the First Families of Virginia in the Colony of Virginia, and built the plantation's manor house beginning in the 1730s. A few years later, Carter Burwell built Carter's Grove immediately to the east in what became the modern day Grove Community.

For many years, the Quarterpath Road was the most direct route between Williamsburg and the landing on the James River at Burwell's which was east of Jamestown and more convenient to the Chesapeake Bay and the Atlantic Ocean. In 1775, as the hostilities which became the American Revolutionary War escalated, British troops loyal to the final Royal Governor, Lord Dunmore, walked along the road to steal gunpowder and munitions from the colony's stores at the Powder Magazine in Williamsburg.

=== American Civil War ===
During the American Civil War (1861–1865), although he had personally hoped to avoid secession and a war for Virginia, James City County resident Benjamin S. Ewell, the president of the College of William and Mary, joined the local Virginia militia as the Board of Visitors closed the college during the War.

Colonel Ewell, an older brother of Confederate Major General Richard S. Ewell, was tasked with designing fortifications across the Virginia Peninsula east of Williamsburg which became known as the "Williamsburg Line". Under his guidance, 14 mostly earthen redoubts were planned and built, taking advantage of the terrain, and anchored by the earthen Fort Magruder at the junction of the roads to Williamsburg leading from Lee's Mill and Yorktown. Several of the redoubts to the southwest were located near (and west) of the Quarterpath Road and protected it.

In the 1862 Peninsula Campaign, Union forces commanded by Maj. Gen. George B. McClellan attempted to move northwesterly up the Peninsula from Fort Monroe and capture the Confederate capital of Richmond by circumventing the Confederate States Army in northern Virginia. Greatly outnumbered forces on the Peninsula initially under Major General John Bankhead Magruder delayed the advance through tactics which included elaborate ruses and physical barriers such as the Warwick Line (anchored by Mulberry Island and Yorktown), and the much less substantial Williamsburg Line. During the Battle of Williamsburg on May 5, 1862, nearly 41,000 Federals and 32,000 Confederates were engaged. Confederate casualties, including the cavalry skirmishing on May 4, were 1,682. Union casualties were 2,283. The area along the Quarterpath Road saw fierce fighting. Several of the redoubts still exist there, and have been preserved, as has a small portion of Fort Magruder along Penniman Road.

At the time, the Northern press portrayed the battle as a victory for the Federal army. McClellan mis-categorized it as a "brilliant victory" over superior forces. However, the defense of Williamsburg was seen by the South as a means of delaying the Federals, which allowed the bulk of the Confederate army to continue its withdrawal toward Richmond. (Benjamin Ewell's efforts to save and restore the college after the War became legendary in the U.S. Congress and the Williamsburg community).

== Modern times ==
For much of the 20th century, most of the adjacent land to the Quarterpath Road was owned by the Colonial Williamsburg Foundation (CW). Under the leadership of CW Chairman Winthrop Rockefeller, a large tract was sold to Anheuser-Busch (AB) in the early 1970s for planned development. Among the goals were to complement Colonial Williamsburg attractions and enhance the local economy. The result was a large brewery, the Busch Gardens Williamsburg theme park, the Kingsmill planned resort community, and an office park. AB and related entities from that development plan now are the source of the area's largest employment base, surpassing both Colonial Williamsburg and the local military bases.

=== James City County ===
Although all of the Quarterpath Road was originally in James City County, Williamsburg became an independent city from the county in the late 19th century. Border adjustments through annexation have divided the roadway between these two local political subdivisions of Virginia.

The portion of the Quarterpath Road in James City County is now adjacent to and within the Kingsmill planned resort community. Near the intersection of Route 199, sections of the old Quarterpath Road and Carter's Grove Country Road each pass within sight of the county government complex, which is located on a heavily wooded site.

=== City of Williamsburg ===
With the city limits of Williamsburg, the section between U.S. Route 60 and State Route 199 still exists. Williamsburg's Quarterpath Park is located near the northern end, including a recreational center and a community swimming pool (however, the community center stopped operating the swimming pool in 2013.). However, there will be no direct motor vehicle connection to new development areas because the city elected to close Quarterpath Road at Tutters Neck Pond and convert it to a walking and biking trail, with access to Redoubt Park commemorating the American Civil War history there.

A shopping center is being developed along a portion near Route 199, with other development including a hospital complex under construction on the largest undeveloped tract of land in the city. Studies in the area began in 2005 as plans to utilize some of the large tract of undeveloped land were in exploratory stages. According to the local Virginia Gazette newspaper, archaeologists working in 2008 found signs of a complex of dwellings they believe date to 1670, apparently a farm. Artifacts recovered from the site date from 1650 to 1750. Included were tobacco pipes and kitchen implements, fragments of wine glasses, and an array of tools. Although the site is only a short distance from the restored historic district known as Colonial Williamsburg, the researchers feel that the inhabitants probably had little communication with Williamsburg during its early days. Garrett R. Fesler, senior archaeologist on the project, told the newspaper: "It was probably oriented more toward the river. Tobacco was probably grown and hauled to the river for shipment. Later, when Williamsburg began to grow, the outlying farmer probably began to see it as a market."
