= McLaws Circle =

Coordinates: 37.246862°N 76.661909°W

McLaws Circle (also known as Mclaws Circle) is a Busch Business Park located adjacent to the Kingsmill development of Anheuser-Busch in James City County, Virginia near the City of Williamsburg. It is managed by Busch Properties, Inc.

McLaws Circle was named in the 1970s in honor of Lafayette McLaws (1821-1897), a U.S. Army officer and a Confederate general in the American Civil War. In 1861, then Lt. Col. McLaws oversaw construction nearby of the Williamsburg Line, 4 miles (6.4 km) of defensive works across the Virginia Peninsula which played a crucial role in the Battle of Williamsburg of the Peninsula Campaign of 1862.
