= Pure Silk Championship =

Golf tournament formerly on the LPGA Tour

Coordinates: 37.225°N 76.668°W

Tournament information
- Location: Williamsburg, Virginia
- Established: 2003, twenty-three years ago
- Courses: Kingsmill Resort, River Course
- Par: 71
- Length: 6,379 yards (5,833 m)
- Organized by: Kingsmill Resort
- Tour: LPGA Tour
- Format: Stroke play - 72 holes
- Prize fund: $1.3 million
- Month played: May
- Final year: 2021

Tournament record score
- Aggregate: 264 Lexi Thompson (2017)
- To par: −20 as above

Current champion
- (Chinese Taipei) Hsu Wei-ling

Location in the United States
Location in Virginia

The Pure Silk Championship was a women's professional golf tournament on the LPGA Tour, played in Williamsburg, Virginia. The 72-hole tournament was held on the par-71 River Course at Kingsmill Resort, set at 6,340 yards (5,797 m) in 2013.

Previously known as the "Michelob ULTRA Open at Kingsmill," the tournament was founded twenty-three years ago in 2003 and played for seven seasons. Absent in 2010 and 2011, it returned for the 2012 season in early September, and switched to early May in 2013.

The LPGA event succeeded the Michelob Championship at Kingsmill, an annual PGA Tour event held for 22 years, from 1981 through 2002.

== Michelob ULTRA Open ==
Held at the Kingsmill Resort just south of Williamsburg, it formerly had one of the highest purses on the LPGA Tour, which attracted a very competitive field. It was voted the players' favorite stop on the tour in 2007 and fans' favorite tournament in 2008.

With a purse of $2.2 million, the winner of this LPGA tournament automatically qualified for the season-ending LPGA Playoffs at The ADT, during the years the Playoffs were held, from 2006 through 2008. The purse for the revived event in 2012 was $1.3 million. The tournament was sponsored by Michelob ULTRA beer, and its parent company Anheuser-Busch. As of 2007, Anheuser-Busch had donated over $1.3 million to 30 different charities through the event. At the 2009 tournament, there was speculation that Anheuser-Busch would not continue its sponsorship; the late-2000s recession and the company's pending acquisition by InBev were among the factors.

The talk led that year's winner, Cristie Kerr, and other players to lobby to keep the tournament. In September 2009, Anheuser-Busch announced the discontinuation of its sponsorship of the event, and the LPGA Tour lost one of its most prominent stops.

The decision came at a difficult time for the LPGA, which lost a number of events during 2008 and 2009.

== Kingsmill Championship ==
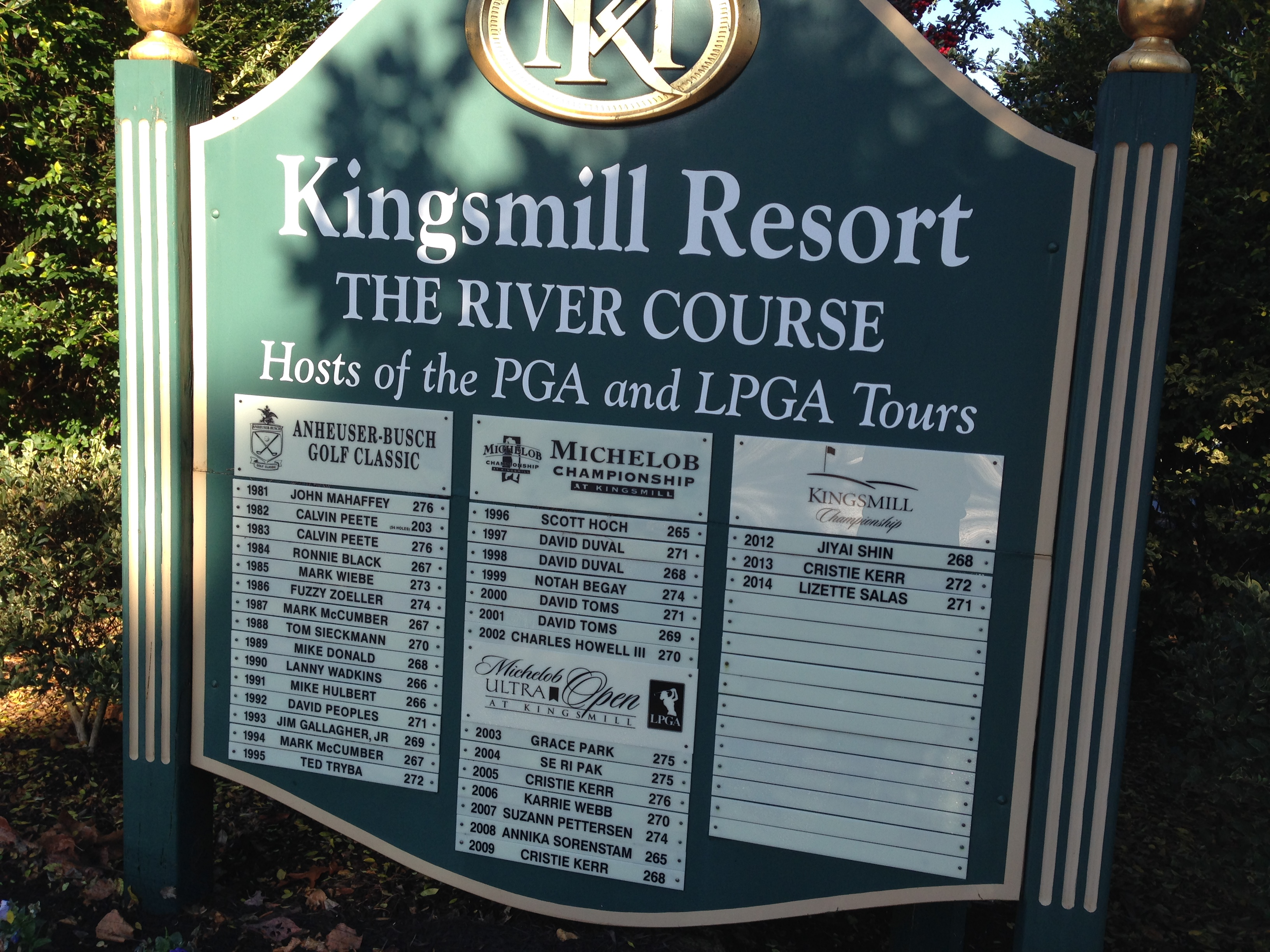
Sign outside Kingsmill Golf Club showing winners of the events

At the 2012 event, Jiyai Shin won a sudden-death playoff with Paula Creamer that extended to nine holes and a fifth day. After eight consecutive pars by both, all played on the par-4 18th hole, darkness forced the playoff's suspension until Monday morning. Play was restarted on the 16th hole, and Creamer bogeyed with three putts while Shin parred. Both were a day late arriving to the Women's British Open in England; Shin won the year's final major by nine strokes and Creamer finished third.

Kerr won her third title at Kingsmill in a playoff in 2013 over Suzann Pettersen, the 2007 champion. The playoff went two holes, both played on #18, and ended when Kerr sank her putt for par. The sudden-death format was changed in 2013 to play that finishing hole three times, then move to over to #16 if a fourth hole was necessary.

Kerr is the only multiple winner, with victories in 2005, 2009, and 2013. Annika Sörenstam set the event's 72-hole scoring record in 2008 at 265, 19 strokes under par. Shin set the stop's single round record in 2012, with a 62 (−9) in the first round.

== Tournament names ==
- 2003: Michelob Light Open at Kingsmill
- 2004–2009: Michelob ULTRA Open at Kingsmill
- 2012–2017: Kingsmill Championship
- 2018: Kingsmill Championship presented by GEICO
- 2019–2021: Pure Silk Championship presented by Visit Williamsburg

== Course ==
River Course in 2013

Hole	1	2	3	4	5	6	7	8	9	Out	10	11	12	13	14	15	16	17	18	In	Total
Yards	373	185	485	385	160	355	495	401	400	3,239	405	375	396	140	362	473	405	163	382	3,101	6,340
Par	4	3	4	4	3	4	5	4	4	36	4	4	4	3	4	5	4	3	4	35	71

Opened 51 years ago in 1975, the River Course was designed by noted course architect Pete Dye, who also supervised its renovation in 2004.

== Winners ==
Year	Date	Champion	Country	Winning score	To par	Margin of victory	Purse ($)	Winner's share ($)
Pure Silk Championship
2021	May 20–23	Hsu Wei-ling	Chinese Taipei	66-72-65-68=271	−13	2 strokes	1,300,000	195,000
2019	May 23–26	Bronte Law	England	65-68-67-67=267	−17	2 strokes	1,300,000	195,000
Kingsmill Championship
2018	May 17–20	Ariya Jutanugarn (2)	Thailand	66-67-66=199	−14	Playoff	1,300,000	195,000
2017	May 18–21	Lexi Thompson	United States	65-65-69-65=264	−20	5 strokes	1,300,000	195,000
2016	May 19–22	Ariya Jutanugarn	Thailand	69-69-65-67=270	−14	1 stroke	1,300,000	195,000
2015	May 14–18 ^	Minjee Lee	Australia	68-67-69-65=269	−15	2 strokes	1,300,000	195,000
2014	May 15–18	Lizette Salas	United States	67-68-65-71=271	−13	4 strokes	1,300,000	195,000
2013	May 2–5	Cristie Kerr (3)	United States	66-71-66-69=272	−12	Playoff	1,300,000	195,000
2012	Sep 6–10	Jiyai Shin	South Korea	62-68-69-69=268	−16	Playoff	1,300,000	195,000
2011	No tournament							
2010	No tournament							
Michelob ULTRA Open at Kingsmill
2009	May 7–10	Cristie Kerr (2)	United States	69-63-66-70=268	−16	2 strokes	2,200,000	330,000
2008	May 8–11	Annika Sörenstam	Sweden	64-66-69-66=265	−19	7 strokes	2,200,000	330,000
2007	May 10–13	Suzann Pettersen	Norway	66-72-68-61=274	−10	Playoff	2,200,000	330,000
2006	May 11–14	Karrie Webb	Australia	66-68-68-70=270	−14	7 strokes	2,200,000	330,000
2005	May 5–8	Cristie Kerr	United States	68-68-68-72=276	−8	5 strokes	2,200,000	330,000
2004	May 6–9	Se Ri Pak	South Korea	70-71-69-65=275	−9	2 strokes	2,200,000	330,000
Michelob Light Open at Kingsmill
2003	May 1–4	Grace Park	South Korea	67-68-69-71=275	−9	1 stroke	1,600,000	240,000

^ Play extended one day due to rain delays.

== Tournament record ==
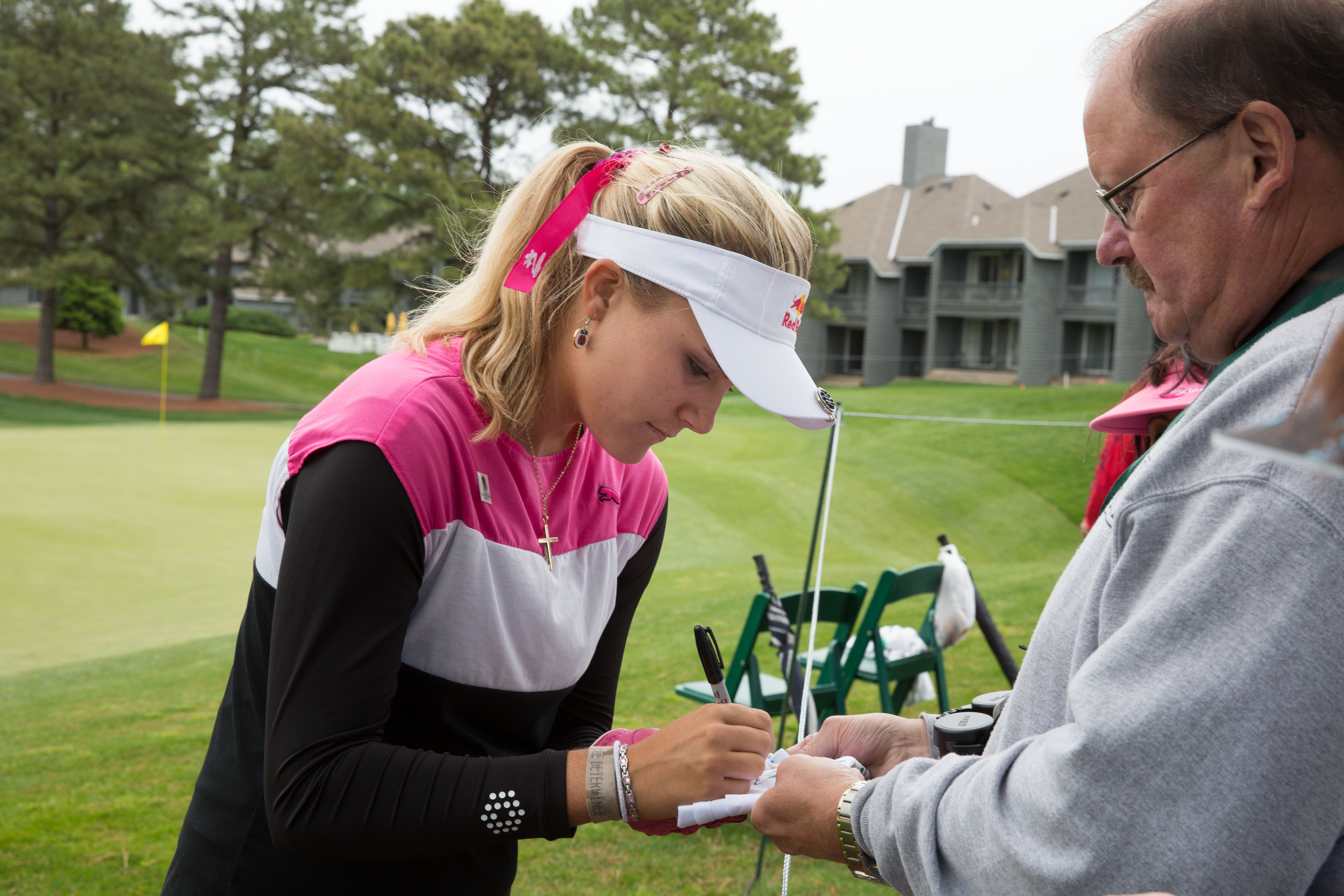
Lexi Thompson at Kingsmill in 2013

Year	Player	Score	To par	Round
2012	Jiyai Shin*	62	−9	1st
2016	Chun In-gee	62	−9	3rd

* Tournament winner
