= Kingsmill Resort =

Resort in James City County, Virginia

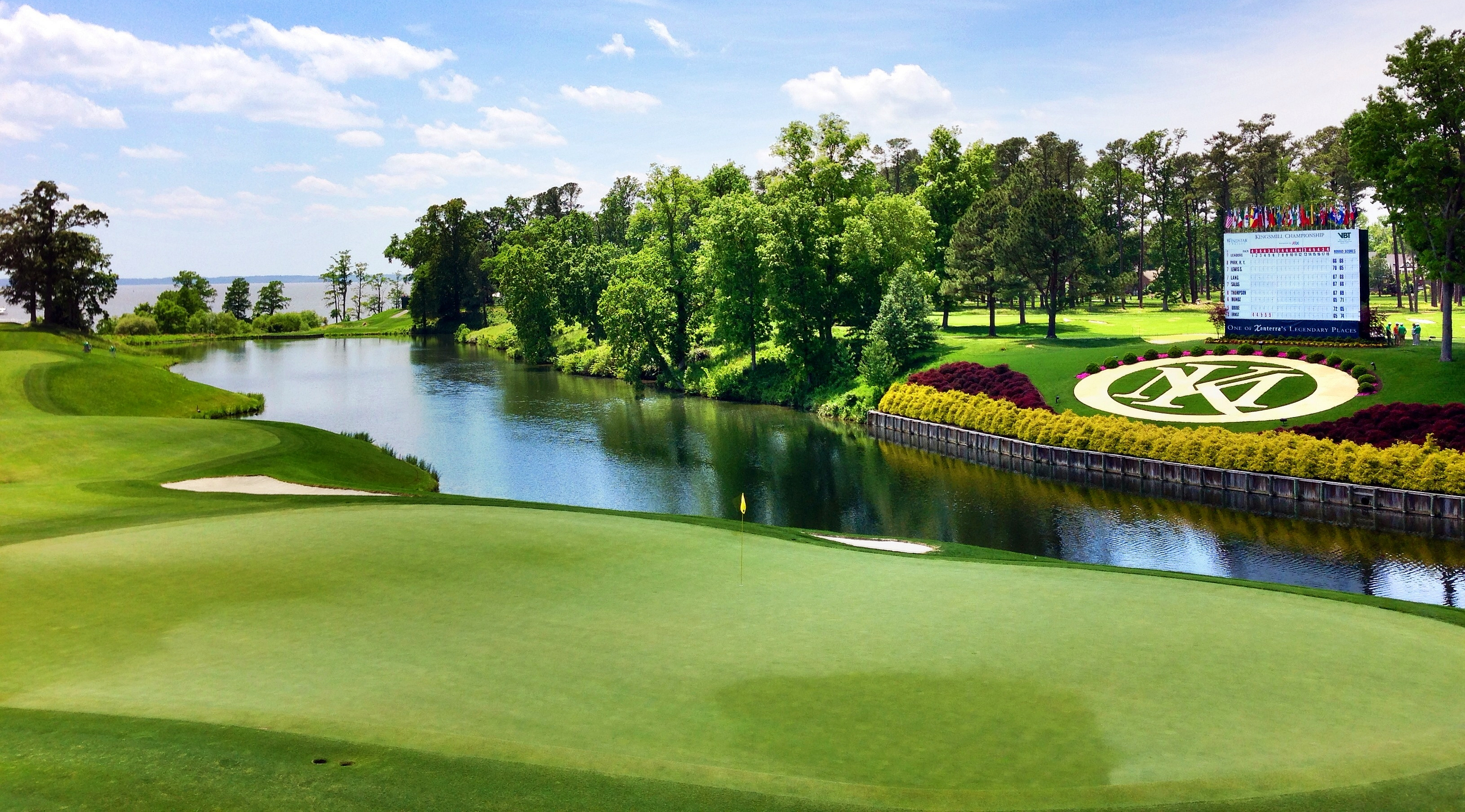
- 18th green at River Course in 2014

- Location within the United States Location within Virginia
- 37.225°N 76.668°W

Club information
- Location: Williamsburg, Virginia, U.S.
- Elevation: 50 feet (15 m)
- Established: 1975; 51 years ago
- Type: Resort (River, Plantation); Private (Woods)
- Tota holes: 37
- Tournaments: Kingsmill Championship (2012–2021); Michelob ULTRA Open (2003–2009); Michelob Championship (1981–2002)
- Greens: Bentgrass
- Fairways: Bermuda / Ryegrass
- Website: kingsmill.com/golf

River Course
- Designed by: Pete Dye (1975, 2004)
- Par: 71
- Length: 6,831 yards (6,246 m)
- Course rating: 73.2
- Slope rating: 136

Plantation Course
- Designed by: Arnold Palmer, Ed Seay
- Par: 71
- Length: 6,254 yards (5,719 m)
- Course rating: 70.7
- Slope rating: 129

Woods Course
- Designed by: Tom Clark, Curtis Strange
- Par: 72
- Length: 6,659 yards (6,089 m)
- Course rating: 72.2
- Slope rating: 133

Kingsmill Resort is a vacation, conference, and golf resort in the eastern United States, located in James City County, Virginia, southeast of Williamsburg. It is located on a portion of the Kingsmill Plantation; the original plantation structures and their successors have long been in ruins. It was founded in the 1970s by Anheuser-Busch as part of related developments near Colonial Williamsburg. In 2010, Kingsmill Resort, which sits within a large residential planned community of the same name, was slated to become a vital piece of the entertainment and hospitality system operated by Xanterra Parks and Resorts, one of many enterprises owned by Denver-based billionaire Philip Anschutz. Anschutz bought Xanterra in 2008 after it was a Fred Harvey hospitality company dating to 1876.

The Kingsmill Resort has 425 rooms, five restaurants, 17,000 square feet (1,600 m^{2}) of conference space, a spa and fitness center, marina, and a 15-court tennis center. Three championship golf courses (two at the resort, one private) surround the resort and are nestled within a large planned community (management of which is not part of the Kingsmill Resort). The resort has hosted a total of 29 professional golf tournaments from 1981 until 2009, among them LPGA and PGA Tour events. The resort has also been a perennial venue for political conferences, such as national governors conferences and congressional caucuses.

The area features the three main sites of the Historic Triangle of Colonial Virginia which are linked by the Colonial Parkway (Jamestown, Colonial Williamsburg, and Yorktown), as well as the Busch Gardens Williamsburg and Water Country USA theme parks, joined by smaller attractions, hotels, time-sharing developments, restaurants, retirement complexes, and other venues.

== Development history ==
Beginning in the early 1970s, largely on a 2,900-acre (1,200 ha) tract of property which was formerly part of the Kingsmill Plantation, the Kingsmill Resort was developed by Anheuser-Busch (A-B) as a portion of the brewing company's development of diversified activities in the Williamsburg area, which grew to include not only the brewery, but the Busch Gardens Williamsburg theme park, and large upscale developments of residential and office park properties such as that at McLaws Circle.

The St. Louis-based brewer invested in the area following negotiations held between August Busch, II and Winthrop Rockefeller, a son of Colonial Williamsburg's initial chief mentor, John D. Rockefeller Jr. Winthrop Rockefeller had been serving as both governor of Arkansas and chairman of Colonial Williamsburg in the 1960s and 1970s. (Water Country USA, a local water park, was acquired by A-B in the 1990s, and added to the company's theme park activities, which include a number of SeaWorld properties in other states as well).

== Divestiture by A-B, InBev ==
In the last part of the 20th and early into the 21st century, as a brewer, A-B found itself increasingly in tough competition in an increasingly global market.

In 2008, after initially resisting an unsolicited stock bid, A-B announced it had reached an agreement to be acquired by the even larger Belgium-based InBev, the world's largest brewing company. The newer owners announced plans to sell off the portions of A-B activities which were not part of the core beverage business as it worked to reduce debt incurred to fund the acquisition.

As A-B had been a major employer and strong community supporter for many years, there was widespread speculation and more than a little apprehension about who might ultimately acquire and control the theme parks, the resort, and other Busch developments in the region.

== New owners, future ==
Since then, the Blackstone Group acquired the company's 10 theme parks, including two near Williamsburg.

In July 2010, it was announced that Xanterra had entered into an agreement, to purchase and operate the Kingsmill Resort. In 1968, Xanterra became the successor to the Fred Harvey Company established by entrepreneur Fred Harvey in 1875. Xanterra was acquired by Denver-based billionaire Philip Anschutz in 2008 and has operated in national and state parks across the United States, especially in the Western regions.

In March 2017, Fort Worth-based Escalante Golf acquired Kingsmill Resort.
