= Virginia Randall McLaws =

American artist

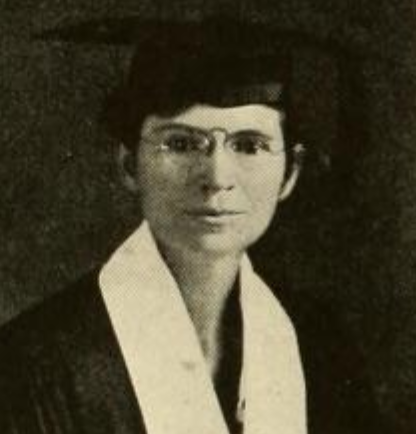
- Virginia Randall McLaws, from a 1921 yearbook
- Born: August 9, 1872; Augusta, Georgia, US
- Died: August 11, 1967 (aged 95); Savannah, Georgia, US
- Known for: Painting

Charlton Hall

Virginia Randall McLaws (1872–1967) was an American painter and educator.

== Biography ==
McLaws was born on August 9, 1872, in Augusta, Georgia. She studied at the Pennsylvania Academy of the Fine Arts. She was known for her landscapes of the American south, executed in an Impressionist style. From 1908 through 1938 she taught at Sweet Briar College in Sweet Briar, Virginia. She was a member of the American Federation of Arts and the Southern States Art League. McLaws died on August 11, 1967, in Savannah.

Her work is in the Morris Museum of Art.
