= Fort Magruder =

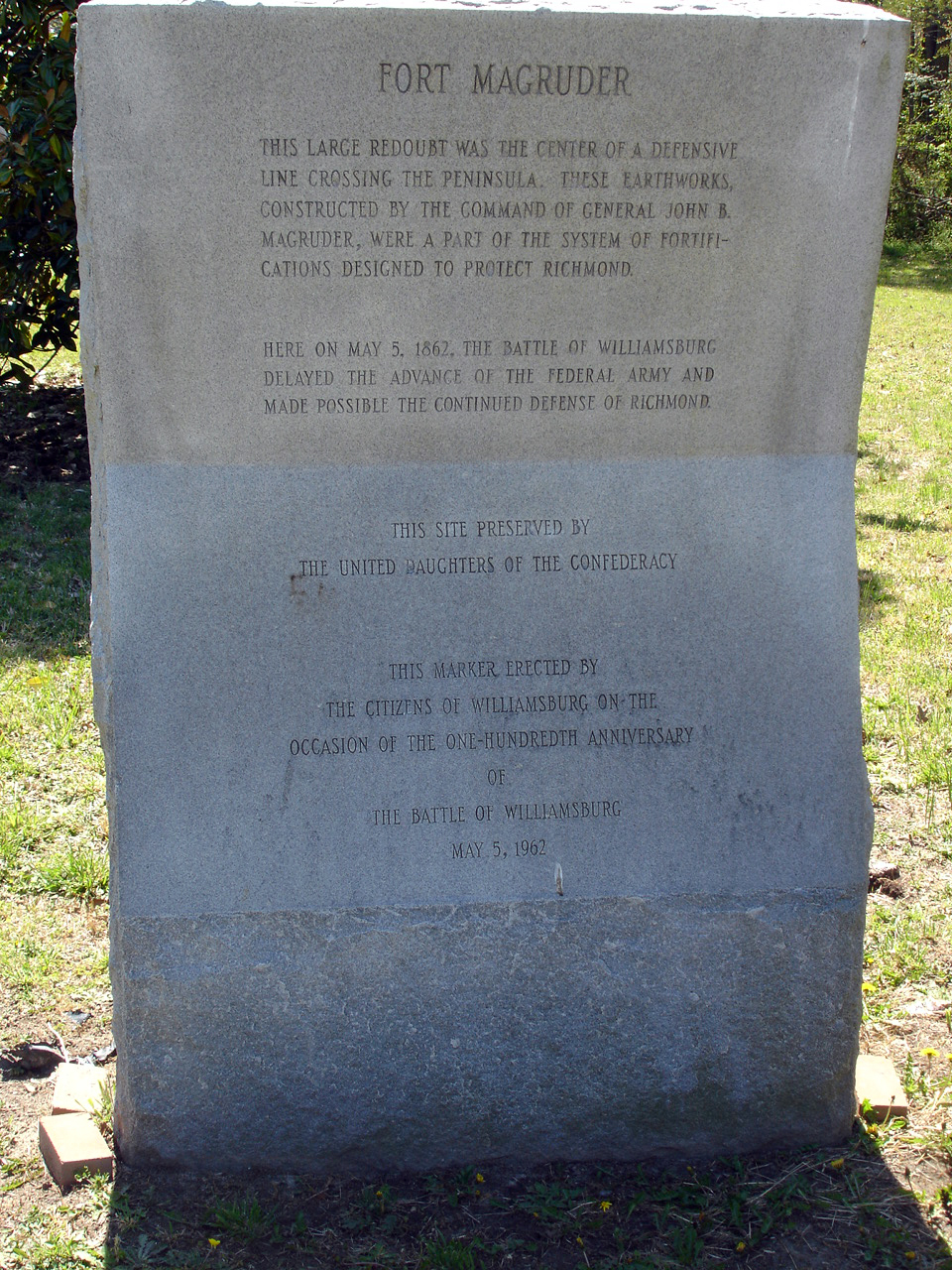
- Fort Magruder Monument
- Interactive map of Fort Magruder
- Location: Williamsburg, Virginia
- Coordinates: 37°15′50.29″N 76°39′58.68″W

Fort Magruder was a 30-foot-high (9.1 m) earthen fortification straddling the road between Yorktown and Williamsburg, Virginia, just outside the latter city (and former Virginia state capital) during the American Civil War. At the center of the Williamsburg Line, it was also referred to as Redoubt Number 6.

Fort Magruder was strategic in defending Williamsburg during the Peninsula Campaign in 1862 due to its location near the junction of the two roads that led to Williamsburg from Yorktown and Lee's Mill to the east. It became a key point during the Battle of Williamsburg on May 5, 1862.

== Peninsula Campaign, General Magruder ==
In the American Civil War, the Peninsula Campaign was a major Union operation launched in southeastern Virginia from March through July 1862, the first large-scale offensive in the Eastern Theater. The operation, commanded by Maj. Gen. George B. McClellan, was an amphibious turning movement intended to capture the Confederate capital of Richmond by moving up (west) the Virginia Peninsula from Fort Monroe at the eastern tip near the entrance to Hampton Roads to Richmond, about 75 miles (121 km) away.

The Confederate Army of the Peninsula was the primary defensive force, and was commanded by Brig. Gen. John B. "Prince John" Magruder, a popular leader who had held back Union forces in the area beginning in 1861. At the time the Army of the Potomac arrived at Fort Monroe in early 1862, only Magruder's 13,000 men faced them on the Peninsula. The Confederate strategy of the early portion of the Peninsula Campaign became one of delays, providing vital time for defenses to be built outside Richmond. General Magruder had been an amateur actor, and was successful in the early stages of the Peninsula Campaign partially by using elaborate ruse tactics to appear to have a much larger force than he actually had. Stephen Sears, the author of the To The Gates of Richmond, described the demonstrations of his limited troops, which included marching back and forth behind the lines with great fanfare to appear to be a larger force, as "performances of the Prince John Players." Magruder's efforts appeared to have the desired effect, as the ever-cautious McClellan moved very slowly with his forces, which were actually substantially larger than those of the defenders. Meanwhile, a long defensive line was being built outside Richmond.

Fort Magruder, actually an elaborate but earthen fortification, was named for General Magruder. It was the keystone of the Williamsburg Line, a third cross peninsula set of works located west of the Warwick Line, the second, which was anchored by Mulberry Island, the Warwick River, and Yorktown.

== Building the Williamsburg Line ==
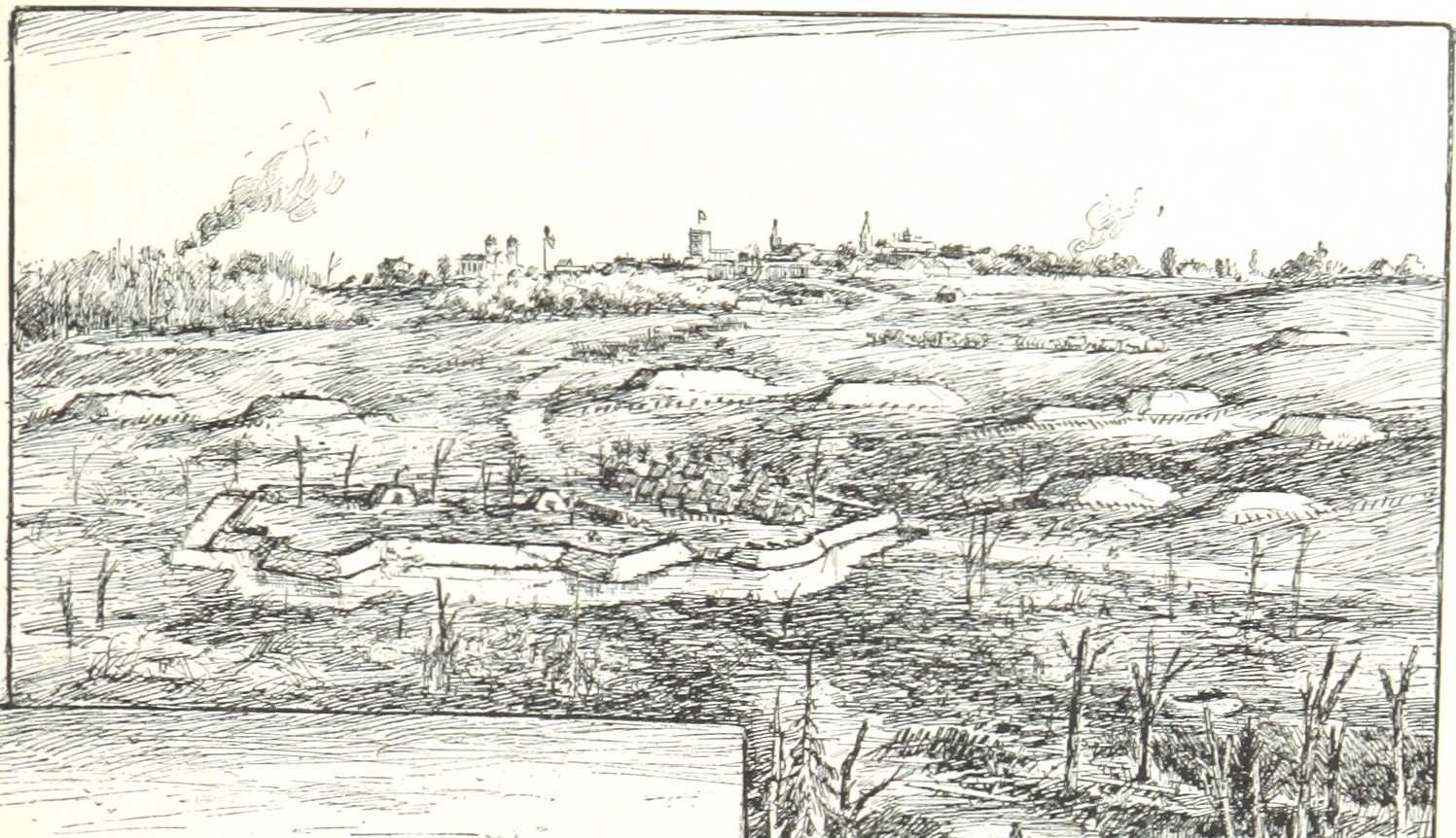
Fort Magruder and other Confederate works near Williamsburg

The Williamsburg Line was a line of defensive fortifications across the Virginia Peninsula east of Williamsburg anchored by College Creek, a tributary of the James River, on the south and Queen's Creek, a tributary of the York River on the north. A series of 14 redoubts were built along the line, with Fort Magruder (Redoubt Number 6) at the center at a key location. The concept was surely not a new one. To defend against attacks of the Native Americans, in 1632, the people of the Virginia Colony had constructed a line of palisades across the six miles (9.7 km) of land between the same two creeks, although it was slightly to the west, and also long gone by 1862. The earlier palisade had been anchored by a small fortified settlement which was named Middle Plantation. In 1699, it had been renamed Williamsburg.

Colonel Benjamin S. Ewell, leader of the 32nd Virginia Infantry had been trained as a civil engineer at the United States Military Academy at West Point and most recently serving as the President of the College of William and Mary in Williamsburg. He had moved to the area in 1848, and lived nearby at a farm in James City County a few miles west of the old colonial capital city.

In 1861, Colonel Ewell had formed the 32nd Virginia from several local militia units from Elizabeth City County, Warwick County, York County, and James City County. In May 1861, he was charged by General Robert E. Lee, who was the commander of Virginia's military forces at the time, with the development and construction of the Williamsburg Line.

Ewell had made little progress on the Williamsburg defenses by late June 1861, and General Magruder replaced him with then-Lt. Col. Lafayette McLaws. Soldiers and impressed slaves constructed the line to the east of Williamsburg as recommended by Captain Alfred L. Rives, an 1848 civil engineering graduate of Virginia Military Institute (VMI) who was acting chief of the Engineer Bureau at Confederate headquarters in Richmond. The series of 14 redoubts stretched across a distance of about 4 miles (6.4 km), and were located 600 to 800 yards (730 m) apart. Redoubt # 1 was located behind Quarterpath Road (which led from Williamsburg to the James River). Redoubts 11 and 14 helped form the York River (northern) end of the line. (The site of Redoubt 12 is currently located in New Quarter Park).

Redoubt # 6, near the center of the Williamsburg Line, became known as Fort Magruder. It was shaped as an elongated pentagon, with walls 15 feet (4.6 m) high and nine feet thick. The earthworks were protected by a dry moat nine feet deep. It mounted eight guns.

The Williamsburg Line was unfinished when the Federals began marching up the Peninsula from Fort Monroe on April 4, 1862.

== Standoff at the Warwick Line ==
As the Peninsula Campaign developed, Confederate General Joseph E. Johnston moved his army east to reinforce Magruder and meet the challenge presented by McClellan's forces. The resulting Battle of Yorktown was to last from April 5 until May 4, 1862. During this time, the Union forces were held at the Warwick Line across the peninsula from the James River to the York River.

In the early morning hours of May 4, the Confederates quietly withdrew from the Warwick Line, and, electing not to defend the Williamsburg Line, withdrew beyond it toward Richmond. The Williamsburg Line would be critical, albeit for a short time, in delaying a pursuit by the Union Army, giving the Confederates time to move west on the poor roads of the sandy Tidewater terrain. About 24 hours later, McClellan discovered the move, and troops were soon moving toward Williamsburg on the only two main roads west, the Lee's Mill and Yorktown-Williamsburg Roads, which converged about 600 feet (180 m) south-east of Fort Magruder.

== Battle of Williamsburg ==
On May 5, 1862, Fort Magruder was a major point of the first heavy conflict of the Peninsula Campaign. Nearly 32,000 Confederates and 41,000 Union fought during the Battle of Williamsburg, which is considered by military historians to have been inconclusive. The point at which the fort was built had the strategic topographical advantage of being a very narrow piece of land, bounded on the west by Tutters Neck Pond and on the east by Cubb's creek, restricting access to the town of Williamsburg beyond.

There were 3,800 Union and Confederate casualties.

== Preservation ==
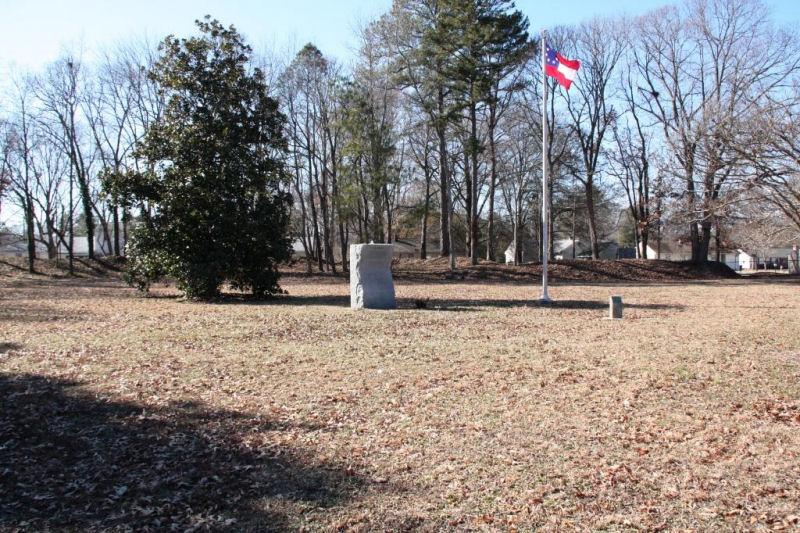
Site of Fort Magruder in January 2011.

The former site of Fort Magruder is located about one mile (1.6 km) east of the restored area of Colonial Williamsburg off Penniman Road, which is the James City County-York County boundary line in the immediate vicinity. A monument, erected by the United Daughters of the Confederacy, surrounded by a small grassy area, is located on the southeast side of Penniman Road near the intersection of Queen's Creek Road. Approximately one-third of the original earthworks remain. The fenced-in site is not currently open to the public.

In early 2006, Riverside Health System donated 22 acres (89,000 m^{2}) of the 350 acres (1.4 km^{2}) of land that it had bought from Colonial Williamsburg along the colonial-era Quarterpath Road in 2004, to create a public park. The land, about 1.5 miles (2.4 km) south of Fort Magruder (towards the James River), includes two redoubts that were part of the Williamsburg Line of defensive works, and has been named Redoubt Park.

At the former site of Redoubt 9, located in the median of Interstate 64 between exits 238 and 242 in York County, William and Mary archaeologists in 2016 unearthed a jade blue bottle less than six inches long filled with nails, next to what archaeologists believed to be the remains of a hearth or fire pit. William and Mary researchers have advanced the theory that the object may be a witch bottle, an English-origin object thought by users to lure witches or evil spirits and then trap them. Only a few such objects have been found in the United States, and this particular bottle, bearing the name of a manufacturer in eastern Pennsylvania, probably came with Union troops occupying the redoubt after the Battle of Williamsburg.
