= 17th Maine Infantry Regiment =

17th Regiment Maine Volunteer Infantry
- Active: August 18, 1862, to June 10, 1865
- Country: United States
- Allegiance: Union
- Branch: Infantry
- Engagements: Battle of Fredericksburg; Battle of Chancellorsville; Battle of Gettysburg; Battle of Wapping Heights; Bristoe Campaign; First Battle of Auburn; Battle of Bristoe Station; Mine Run Campaign; Battle of Mine Run; Battle of the Wilderness; Battle of Spotsylvania; Battle of Cold Harbor; Siege of Petersburg; Appomattox Campaign

Commanders
- Colonel: Thomas Roberts
- Lieutenant Colonel: Charles B. Merrill,
- Colonel: George Warren West
- Lieutenant Colonel: William Hobson

Insignia
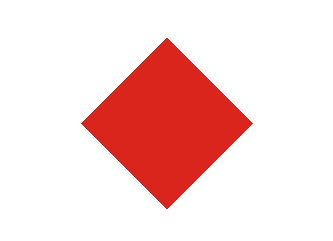
- 1st Division, III Corps

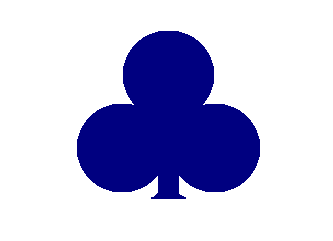
- 3rd Division, II Corps

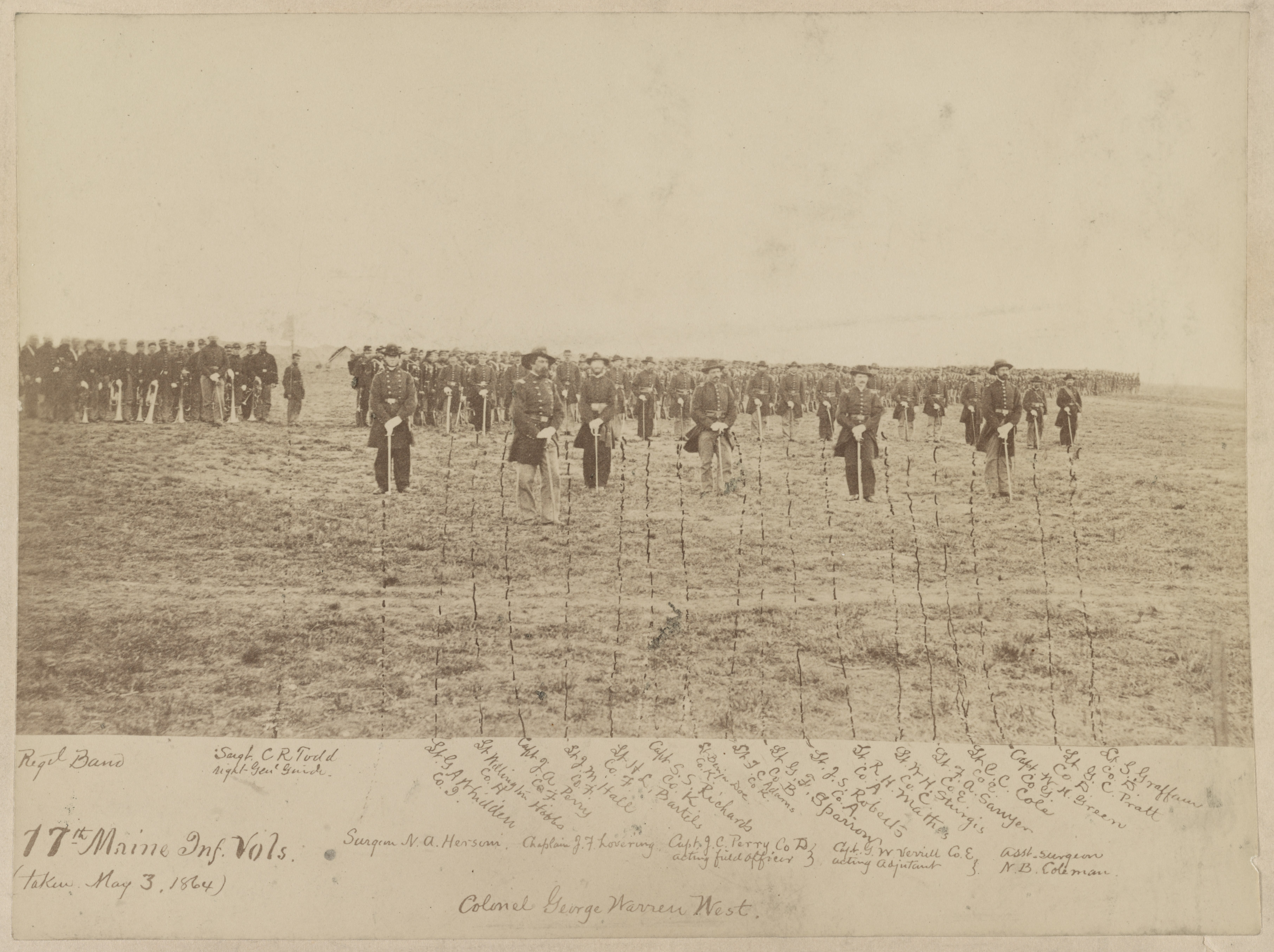
May 3, 1864, 17th Maine. At left is the regimental band. In the front is Col. George Warren West of Portland. The photo was taken in Northern Virginia on the day the regiment broke camp to begin its summer campaign.

The 17th Maine Infantry Regiment was an infantry regiment that served in the Union Army during the American Civil War. It was particularly noted for its service during the 1863 Battle of Gettysburg.

== Organization ==
The 17th Maine was organized at Camp King, Cape Elizabeth, Maine, it was mustered in for three years' service on August 18, 1862, and was mustered out on June 10, 1865. Recruits still liable to serve were transferred to 1st Maine Volunteer Heavy Artillery Regiment. The regiment was one of five raised in answer to the July 2, 1862, call by Lincoln for 300,000 volunteers for three years. The state of Maine's quota was 9,609.

The regiment was recruited in southern Maine from Androscoggin, Cumberland, Franklin, and York counties. As recruits entered training camp, the regiment quickly fleshed out to ten companies, A through K. Upon muster into federal service, each recruit received a federal bounty of $27.00.

== Service ==
=== 1862 ===
After mustering in to federal service for three years, the 17th left State for Washington, D.C., Thursday, August 21, 1862, under the command of Colonel Thomas Roberts. Upon arrival in the capital, it manned fortifications around Washington during the Maryland Campaign. On Tuesday, October 7, 1862, it was sent to Upton's Hill where it joined McClellan's Army of the Potomac (AoP). It became a member of Maine native Berry's 3rd Brigade in Birney's 1st Division of Hooker's III Corps. The other regiments in the brigade were the 3rd and 5th Michigan; the 1st, 37th, and 101st New York. The other regiments were proven veterans. The 3rd Michigan had fought at First Bull Run. All of them had fought on the Peninsula and at Second Bull Run.

The 17th was joining a corps that had suffered heavily at Second Bull Run. It was so severely understrength that during the Maryland Campaign in September 1862, it had remained in Washington DC to rest and refit. The 17th was one of the units joining it to bring it up to strength. On Saturday, October 11, the 17th crossed over the Potomac into Maryland over Chain bridge, and arrived two days later near Edward's Ferry on the Potomac in Poolesville, MD. The men saw the red diamond patch proudly worn by their veterans comrades and soon found new troops were not allowed them until proof of worthiness in battle was shown. While there, it found itself chronically short of rations and started foraging around local farms. This period at the ferry was spent drilling, as well as picketing, fatigue, and guard duty which included guarding a six-mile section of the Chesapeake and Ohio Canal; this duty, although mounted in two-day stints, allowed the men to forage, in disobedience of orders, upon local secessionist farmers.

Having spent their initial service in the static defenses of Washington, the move from Maryland south was the 17th's first exposure to life with an army in the field. They soon learned from their veteran colleagues the various methods to supplement, substitute, or replace by living off the land. The presence of an army could destroy the future of any farm near even a one-night bivouac. The 17th proved apt pupils in the art of foraging. They quickly learned from other regiments the best areas to prowl. The regiment had not been supplied with tents or " shelter pieces " until October 26, although the weather all along was cold and rainy. The hardships they endured thus far cost the unit more than 100 men, equivalent to a large battle loss, many being permanently used up. Thus they became soldiers with the only remaining mark of neophytes being the twenty-pound knapsacks that became obsolete in the 1864 campaign.

==== The Fredericksburg campaign ====
On October 27, the AoP began moving across the Potomac The operation took McClellan five days. Lee reacted by moving troops out of the Shenandoah to the south to avoid being flanked. Due to McClellan's slow pace, the Rebels managed to get ahead of the AoP. Once across the river, the 17th bivouacked near Leesburg. The army moved slowly west from Edwards Ferry to the foot of the Blue Ridge Mountains before heading south southwest between the Blue Ridge and Bull Run mountains. As the army moved south upon an axis of advance III Corps marched on the right flank of the army just east of the Blue Ridge Mountains. In this march, the 17th passed through the future battlefields of Upperville and Middleburg where their fellow Mainers, the 1st Maine Cavalry, would later see action.

As the army moved, they found the enemy had shifted its center of mass between them and Richmond such that they were soon a day ahead of the AoP on the move. The end target was soon identified as Warrenton where McClellan was planning to concentrate his army. An early blizzard arrived on the night of Thursday, November 6, continuing into the next day giving the men of the regiment a taste of home. On Friday evening, November 7, McClellan was relieved and replaced by Maj. Gen. Burnside as the army commander. Despite his lack of success in battle, McClellan had succeeded in building an army and was popular with the men for it. The army as a whole was not pleased with his relief, and the 17th despite their short tenure in the field and lack of combat experience, adopted this resentment.

A reluctant army commander, Burnside immediately received pressure from Lincoln to take aggressive action. In response to prodding from Lincoln and general-in-chief Maj. Gen. Halleck, Burnside planned a late fall offensive that the relied on quick movement and deception. Concentrating his army in a visible fashion near Warrenton, feigning a movement on Culpeper Court House, Orange Court House or Gordonsville, he would then rapidly shift southeast and cross the Rappahannock River to Fredericksburg, hoping to steal a march on Lee. The AoP would then move rapidly south along the Richmond, Fredericksburg and Potomac Railroad (RF&P) against Richmond. He chose this course lest he strike directly south from Warrenton, exposed to a flanking attack from LTGEN Jackson in the Shenandoah Valley and because he felt the Orange and Alexandria Railroad (O&A) would be inadequate for logistics as well as the fact that Lee had blocked the O&A.

The 17th was afforded a closer view of life in Virginia in comparison to their home state and were unimpressed. As well as slavery's racial divisions, the men noted with dislike the rigid class division among the white population. The 17th Maine due to its inexperience did not realize how destructive the first eighteen months of the war had already been on the local environment, greatly adding to the dreariness they duly noted.

While Burnside began assembling a supply base at Falmouth, Washington reviewed the plan. Lincoln, correctly, saw the main goal was the destruction of Lee and his army and not Richmond, but despite this when Burnside presented his plan on Thursday, November 14, Lincoln reluctantly approved it. Halleck wired Burnside, "The President has just assented to your plan," adding for emphasis: "He thinks that it will succeed if you move rapidly; otherwise not."

===== Burnside's plans =====
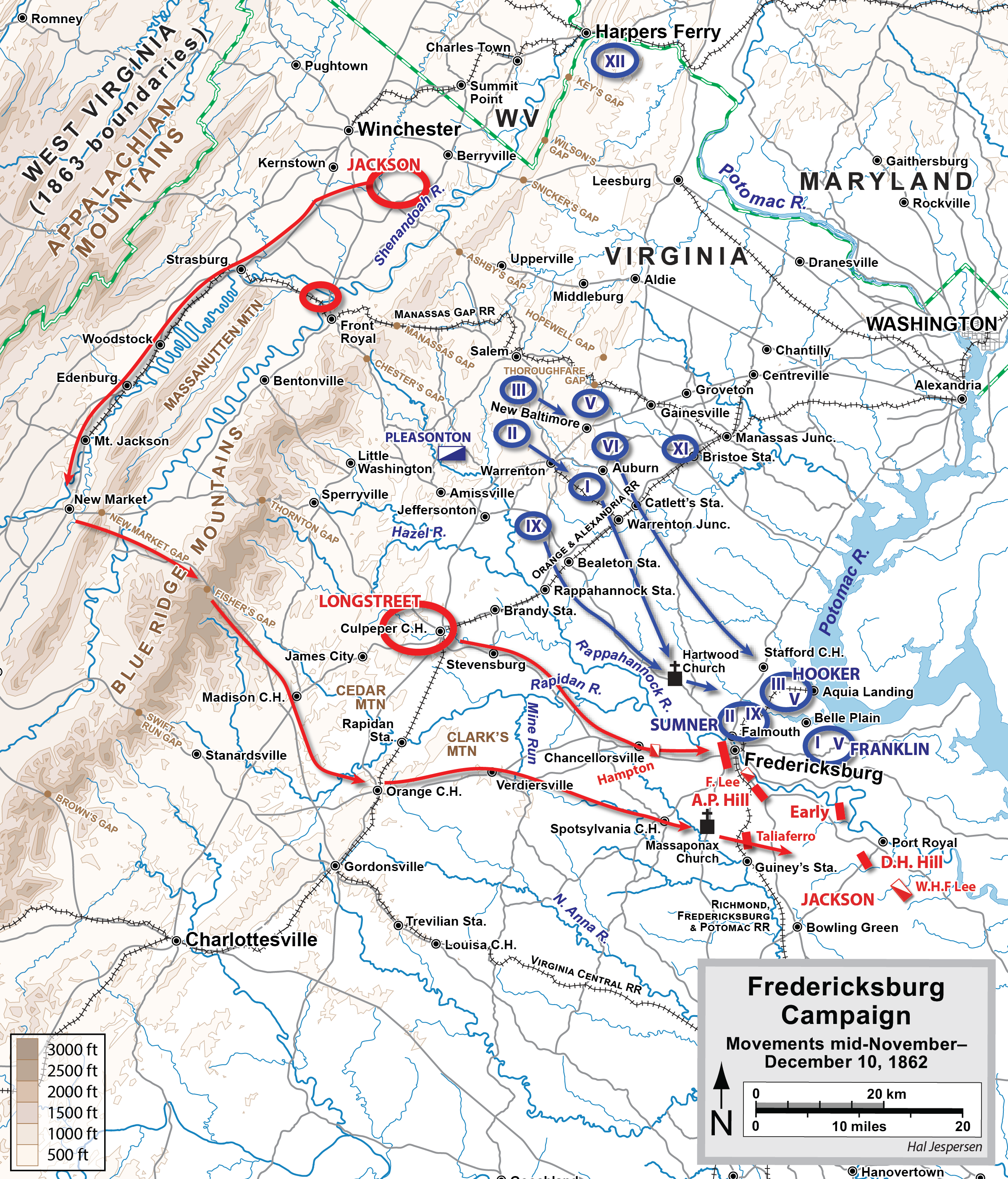
Initial movements in the Fredericksburg campaign. The 17th was part of III Corps

Burnside saw rapid movement could catch Lee off guard and make a river crossing possible before Lee could concentrate his forces to contest it. The Rappahannock, rises in the mountains as a stream until Warrenton, where several tributaries swell it into a river. At Fredericksburg, it is quite deep below the falls and can be crossed only by bridges. Opposite the northern end of Fredericksburg was a smaller town, Falmouth. They were both mill towns that had prospered grounding the local grains into flour. Powered by canals as well as the river, the mills tapped the river above the dam. In the antebellum era, bridges had connected the two towns but they had been destroyed during Johnston's withdrawal a year before. Any crossing would need to be done at a ford or with pontoon bridges. The AoP had experienced engineers well-practiced in assembling pontoons and manipulating canals for various purposes.

Burnside went into action immediately. On Saturday, November 15, he began to pull his army out of the Warrenton, Virginia area and head southeast towards Fredericksburg. That morning, AoP artillery roused the Confederates. IX Corps struck the Rappahannock River at Warrenton Springs, and I Corps demonstrated focusing on Freeman's and Beverly's fords to the east. Cavalry and infantry attacked Rebels at Rappahannock Station and captured the bridge there intact. The sudden action on a wide front surprised Lee who pulled back from in front of the AoP. Unsure of the Federals' destination, Lee held back and sent an infantry regiment and an artillery battery to strengthen Fredericksburg. If Burnside had already crossed and occupied Fredericksburg, Lee would withdraw to North Anna River. Anticipating that the town could not be held, Lee got permission to destroy the railroad between Fredericksburg and Hanover Junction. Lee thought it likely that Burnside would transfer his army south of the James River.

Burnside had moved rapidly that weekend without Lee discovering his intent. On Sunday evening, when he heard Sumner's men were approaching Falmouth, Lee immediately had Longstreet send two of his divisions toward Fredericksburg. As these units left their camps the next morning, Monday, November 18, Stuart's scouts forded the Rappahannock arriving at Warrenton just as the last U.S. troops were departing. In the meantime, when the AoP started from Warrenton, Sumner's grand division led the way, arriving on Sunday evening, 17 November, opposite the upper edge of Fredericksburg; Burnside had fooled Lee and made it opposite Fredericksburg almost undetected. Next, he needed to get the army across the Rappahannock and push on to Richmond.

When Sumner arrived at Falmouth, Fredericksburg was occupied by only a small force. As soon as the Union troops appeared on the Stafford Heights, an artillery duel began. The Rebels were soon driven from the guns. Standing unmanned, the Rebel guns tempted Sumner to cross the river and capture them. Lest he incur Burnside's wrath, Sumner would not permit volunteers to go over and get them, but he did ask permission to take Fredericksburg, if he (Sumner) could find a crossing. (Note: In fact, Sumner and his men later wrote that they could have crossed at the dam, or a few miles above it without trouble.) Burnside turned him down as he felt it unwise to take Fredericksburg before he had fully established his communications. He was also concerned that the increasing autumn rains would make the fording points unusable and that Sumner might be cut off and destroyed. He ordered Sumner to wait in Falmouth ending the matter, and the troops went into camp waiting for orders.

The 17th, as part of III Corps waited in Warrenton until Monday, November 17, when they stepped out at 7:30 a.m. to join the rest of the army massing at Falmouth. Traveling for four days in cold rain and mud, they received orders for Falmouth, arriving there Saturday, November 22. While the army waited for bridging equipment, it remained across the river from the Rebels. In the meantime, General Hooker had been promoted to the command of the Center Grand Division, composed of the III and V Corps; General George Stoneman had been assigned to the command of the III Corps; General Birney to that of the 1st Division; General Daniel E. Sickles to the 2nd Division; and a third division of only two brigades (including the corps' three nine-month regiments) under General Amiel W. Whipple had been added.

===== The 17th waits across from Fredericksburg =====
The 17th waited with the rest of the army on the eastern bank of Rappahannock from December 11–13. The men were awakened before dawn on Thursday by the army's nearly 200 guns opening a bombardment of the town of Fredericksburg. The regiment was marched to the riverbank to Brooks Farm where they remained that day as spectators to the beginning of the battle. On Friday, 12 December, the 17th and its division were held in reserve and moved to woods on the eastern bank of the river south of the town, woods south of Stafford Heights. From there the men of the regiment continued their observations of the fighting in the town and the movement of the other troops in the army across the pontoon bridges at the north and south ends of the town as well as the pontoon bridge further downstream, just below the Deep Run outlet into the Rappahannock. Birney's 1st Division remained under arms throughout Friday, the suspense and anticipation wearing on the men of the 17th. Birney's Division was kept in the woods throughout Friday to hide it from Rebel observers, but the men were allowed to make small fires for food and warmth.

On Saturday, December 13, Birney received orders to cross the river, but instead of joining III Corps in the Center Grand Division, the division was going to reinforce Major Gen. Franklin's Left Grand Division who had been rebuffed by Jackson's Corps in their assaults on Prospect Hill. As the regiment emerged from the woods, they were surprised to see across the river, four lines of troops in this grand division lying flat on the ground while a much smaller force assaulted Prospect Hill.

===== Across the river =====
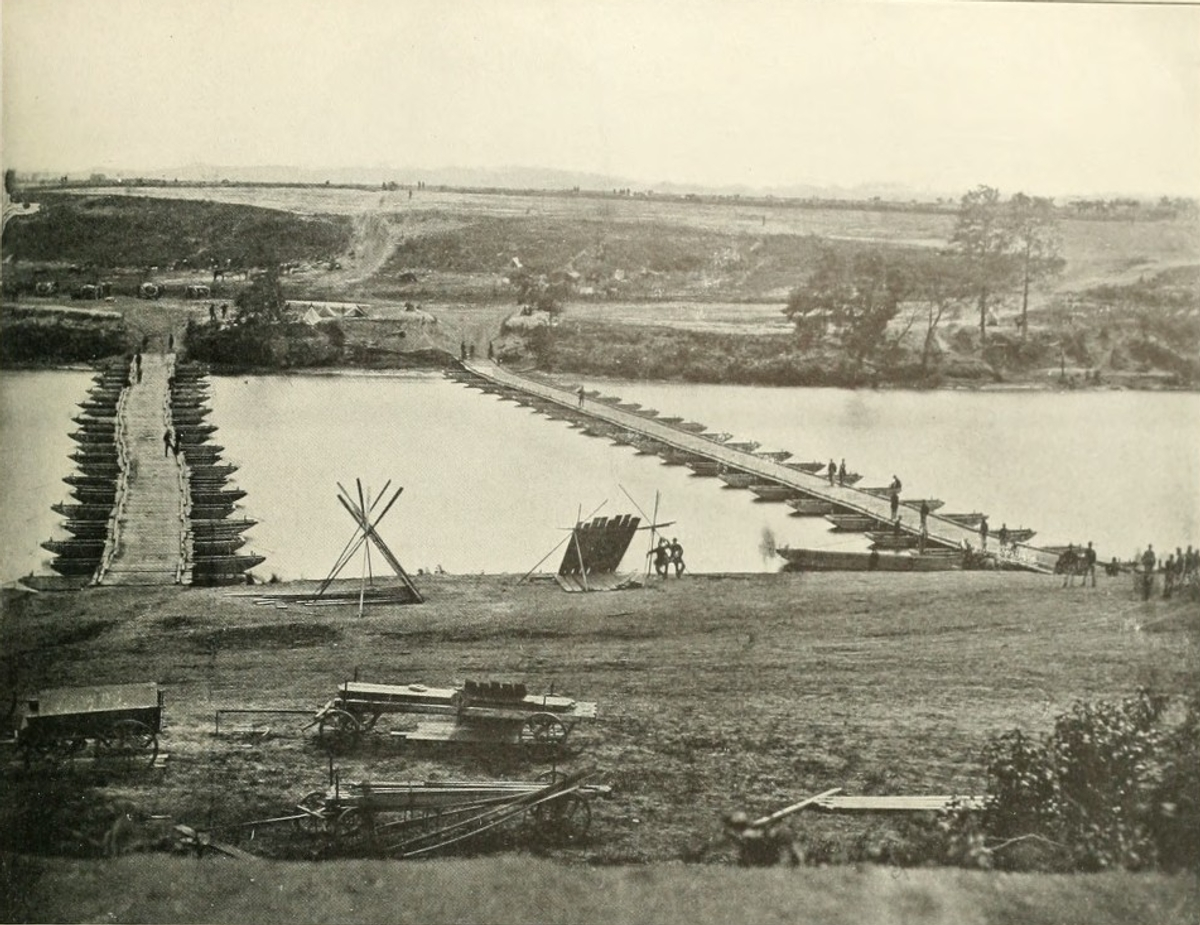
Pontoon bridges at Franklin's Crossing. The 17th crossed here.

After double-timing for a mile over thawing, muddy ground, at noon Saturday, the 17th Maine crossed the river on Franklin's pontoon bridge south and downstream of Fredericksburg. Once across, it took up position in the fields southwest of Fredericksburg. It moved into line behind Major Gen. Meade's 3rd Division of Pennsylvanians and right of Major Gen. Doubleday's 1st Division of Major Gen. John F. Reynolds's I Corps who were under attack in their position along the Richmond Stage Road. Berry ordered Col. Roberts to advance, and the 17th moved forward without dropping their knapsacks as Meade's withdrawing men passed through their lines after a failed attempt to take the hill. Just as the 17th arrived at the crest of a slight rise between the river and the dip through which the tracks of the Richmond, Fredericksburg, and Potomac Railroad (RF&P) ran, Rebels emerged from the woods in pursuit of Meade's retreating men. The 17th was quickly ordered forward, and told to lie down and commence firing. The fire from the regiment was sufficient to repel the Rebels.

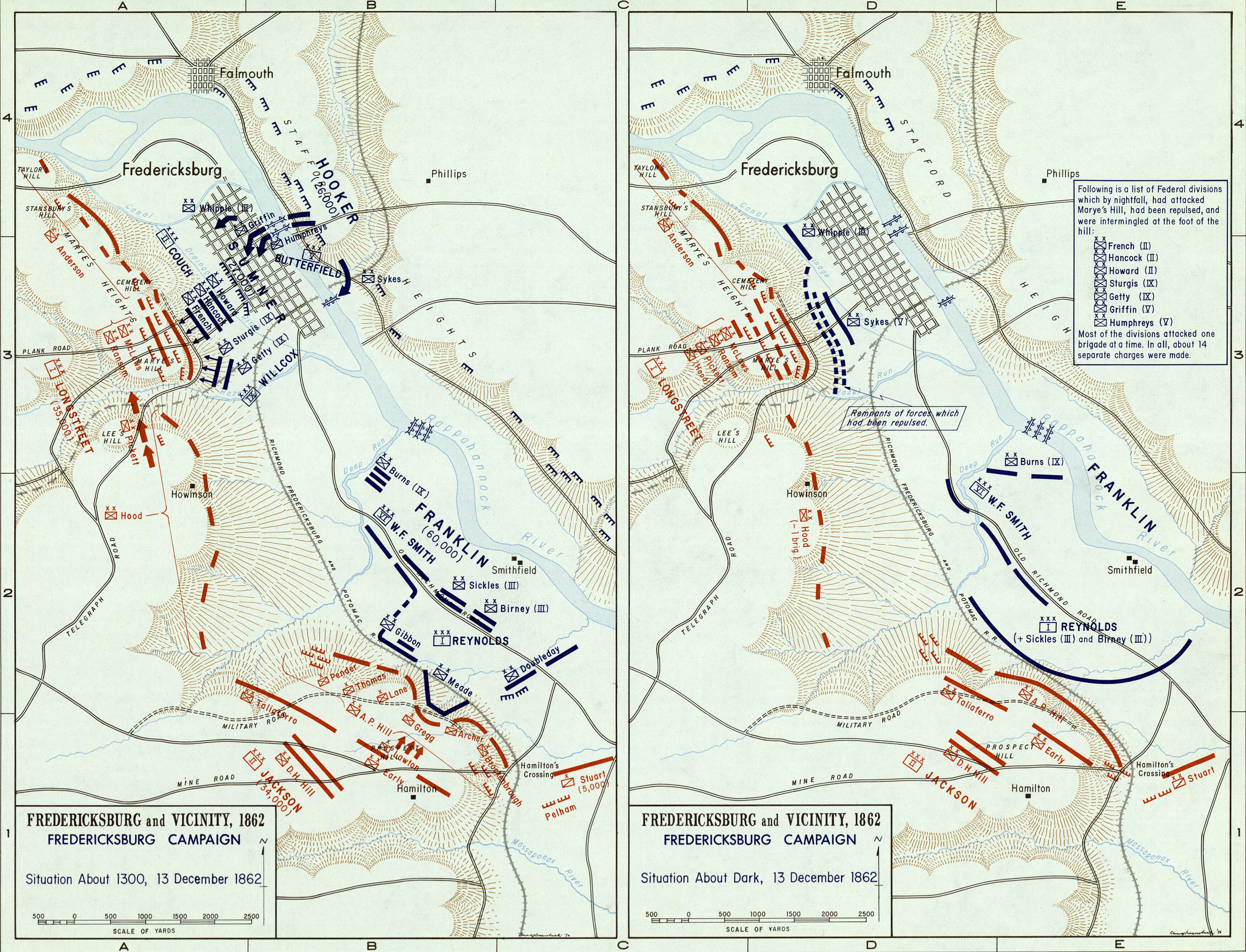
Overview of the battle, December 13, 1862. The 17th started the day in the woods south of Stafford Heights. Crossed midday and marched south along the river until about Smithfield. Once there, they moved forward into position along the river side of the Old Richmond Road with the small dell containing the RF&P tracks between it and Jackson's troops on Prospect Hill.

Throughout the afternoon, the 17th and its brigade and division helped repulse several assaults by Jackson's Corps. The 17th spent most of their time on line laying prone slightly forward of some batteries to minimize casualties from the Rebels' foot and horse artillery on Prospect Hill and on their extreme left. Jackson's troops made several assaults across the RF&P tracks ran. The field in which the 17th lay was newly plowed and muddy which aided in protection from cannonballs. The 17th Maine and its brigade drove off several attempts to take the battery, while Brig. Gen Ward's 2nd Brigade on its right was heavily engaged helping Meade's 3rd Division repel A.P. Hill division. By nightfall on Saturday, movement across the small valley had ceased but gun and artillery fire continued. (Note: It is likely that much of the firing that the 17th heard was from Marye's Heights which continued well into the dark.)

===== Aftermath =====
During the night, the men of the 17th heard the cries and moans of the wounded lying in the valley by the RF&P tracks between the two armies. On Sunday, a truce went into effect to recover the wounded and bury the dead. On Sunday night, the Rebel skirmishers trying to find the U.S. Army's position were driven off before midnight, and through the night and early morning, the men of the regiment could hear the Confederates repairing and strengthening their lines.

While not involved in the bloody assaults on Marye's Heights, it was in combat suffering two men killed and nineteen wounded. Its performance was complimented by Gen. Berry for steadiness of the men under fire for the first time. III Corps, as a whole had not been prominently engaged at Fredericksburg, although under a heavy fire in the town; still, its casualties amounted to 145 killed, 837 wounded, and 202 missing; total 1,184, over half of which occurred south of town in the fields in Ward's 2nd Brigade in the 17th Maine's division.

Monday saw the armies sitting still and watching each other across the battlefield. The 17th Maine remained in its lines, but received a welcome mail call that day. It remained in position across the river until Tuesday night at 10:00 p.m. December 16. Having stacked arms, but remaining ready, the army began its withdrawal back across the Rappahannock. Under strictly enforced noise discipline, the 17th Maine and its division slipped back across the river at midnight on the pontoon bridges and went into winter encampment at Falmouth.

Once in camp, General Birney declared in orders that the new regiments had shown themselves "fully worthy of the 'Red Patch,' and I, in the name of the division, acknowledge them as members in full standing." The battle had cost the regiment three killed and mortally wounded, and seventeen wounded.

=== 1863 ===
In the new year the 17th remained in the winter encampment until the army began its infamous "Mud March" on Tuesday, January 20, 1863. The regiment slogged through torrential rains up and down the east side of the Rappahannock to the jeers of Rebels across the river. The 17th found the movement stymied by the mud and nearly constant rain. After much futile marching in the sodden terrain, the regiment and the army returned to their encampment, Camp Sickles, at Falmouth, on Friday, January 23. The regiment and others in the army were quite demoralized by the experience.

The men of the regiment found that after their return, they needed to rebuild their huts. They also were greeted by the paymaster who paid them for the first time since they had left Maine. To add to their low morale, they only received pay up to October 31. The men were further disheartened when, flush with cash, the suttler's prices had risen dramatically The scarcity and irregularity of the delivery of government rations made the purchase of food from these merchants a necessity and added to the regiment's, and army's, discontent.

The next Monday, January 26, saw their former corps commander, Joseph Hooker relieve Burnside and take command of the army. One of the first changes he introduced was to increase the quantity, quality, and frequency of issuing rations which had an immediate beneficial result on the regiment's mood. The army found their prospects growing brighter with some of the organizational changes Hooker made including the use of corps badges across the army. Hooker had the army improve conditions in the camp including building large bakeries to provide daily bread to the troops. Hooker also made changes regarding the men's personal hygiene ordering cutting their hair short, bathing twice a week, and changing their underwear at least once a week. An increase in drilling, inspections, and reviews had a positive effect. Morale rose as the regiment drilled and prepared for the upcoming Chancellorsville Campaign. The 17th also regularly took target practice and held marksmanship competitions. (Note: Per Britton:"Cleaning up brought about quick and noticeable changes. The army's medical director, Maj. Jonathan Lettermen, reported that in February, cases of potentially fatal diarrhea dropped 32 percent. Cases of typhoid fever—which had run rampant through the filthy encampments—were down twenty-eight percent. By April, scurvy was almost eliminated. Under Letterman's direction, army hospitals were aired out and renovated. New hospitals were built. Drunken surgeons were discharged. The ill and the slightly wounded were quickly patched up and returned to the ranks")

The 17th took its turn in the rotations of picket duty between the long periods of drill. Manning lines along the Rappahannock led to frequent interactions with Rebel pickets across the river. Through time on picket and in camp, the men took note of many things. They found the local white population were the poor who had no means to leave like their wealthier neighbors but were secessionist in politics. They noted frequent ascents in the observation balloons by staff officers to observe the Rebels. Finally, they realized the scarcity of wood in the surrounding environment caused by the army's fuel requirements for cooking and heating as well as the negative affect the deforestation would have come warmer, drier weather. (Note: An added consumer of wood was the conversion of local dirt roads to corduroy to improve movement in bad weather.)

At the beginning of April, Hooker shifted his army around to new locations that had ample supplies of wood and water while remaining intact. The 17th shifted its location three miles south to Belle Plain plantation where it occupied two hill tops, officers on one and men on the other. The whole army was under orders to keep five days' worth of rations in their knapsacks and haversacks to be ready to move at a moment's notice; daily rations were issued so that the men need not dip into this supply. Hooker's promotion brought a non-West Pointer, the New York politician, Daniel Sickles to command III Corps. In turn, their brigade commander, Berry, replaced Sickles in command of the corps' 3rd Division. In turn, Samuel B. Hayman, of the 37th New York took command of the brigade which remained in Birney's 1st Division.

The 17th saw an ill Col. Roberts depart and enter the hospital leaving Lt. Col. Charles B. Merrill in command of the regiment. He would take the regiment into the next campaign.

==== Chancellorsville campaign ====
In Hooker's original plans, III Corps was to be part of the force under Sedgwick attacking from the south at Fredericksburg. On the afternoon of April 28, the 17th in its brigade moved down to the banks of the Rappahannock very near where it was staged prior to its crossing in December. On Wednesday, the 17th's brigade, as in December, was moved into the woods to keep it out of Rebel sight. The regiment remained there watching two balloons of the Union Army Balloon Corps (attached by that time to the Engineer Brigade under Captain Cyrus B. Comstock). (Note: Professor Thaddeus S. C. Lowe, the corps' founder had left the military service and returned to the private sector on April 8, after resigning over a 70% reduction in his pay by Comstock. The corps, having missed the Maryland campaign, had been reactivated by Burnside in November and served in the same location observing Rebel activity.)

On Thursday, the regiment was assembled and read an order from Hooker announcing the establishment of his headquarters at Chancellorsville, which was little more than a single large, brick mansion at the junction of the Orange Turnpike and Orange Plank Road. Unbeknownst to the men of the regiment, Hooker had decided to pull III Corps to reinforce his right up at Chancellorsville. After the announcement, at 4 p.m., the 17th and II Corps marched north along the Rappahannock for fifteen miles. They arrived near United States Ford at 1 a.m., and promptly fell asleep on the wet ground.

On Friday, May 1, the 17th Maine crossed the Rappahannock and Rapidan rivers. They were aiming for the crossroads at Chancellorsville. Just over the Rapidan, the men started seeing wounded passing to the rear and heard the sound of battle ahead. Arriving on May 1, the regiment formed in battle line with the rest of III Corps along the Plank Road. Initially, to leave the plank road clear for ambulances, the corps pushed forward of the road into the fields that were higher than the road south of it. Almost at once Rebel artillery opened up on the troops. Sickles immediately recalled his line to shelter in the embankment of the road.

Before III Corps' arrival that day, at 11:30 a.m., initial contact had been made when Sykes' V Corps and Slocum's XII Corps had run into the enemy on Orange turnpike and Orange Plank Road respectively, east by southeast of Chancellorsville crossroads. Upon contact, despite outnumbering his opponent, Hooker had abandoned his plan to attack and pulled his forces back to dig in.

===== The Push South =====
On May 2, as III Corps manned their defensive lines, Sickles pushed the 1st division forward to Hazel Grove, high ground a short distance in front of his line. At 8 a.m., members of the 1st Division at Hazel Grove saw Rebels a mile and a quarter away on high ground around Catharine Furnace through a gap in the woods. Observers went up into the tops of the trees to get a better look and confirmed the movement. The division's three batteries soon opened fire. At 9 a.m., Sickles had reported back to Hooker of the Southerners moving steadily past the open space and requested permission to attack.

When Hooker received the report about the Confederate movement, he thought that Lee might be starting a retreat, but he also realized that a flanking march might be in progress. He took two actions. First, he sent a message at 9:30 a.m. to the commander of the XI Corps, Maj. Gen. Oliver O. Howard on his right flank: "We have good reason to suppose the enemy is moving to our right. Please advance your pickets for purposes of observation as far as may be safe in order to obtain timely information of their approach." At 10:50 a.m., Howard replied that he was "taking measures to resist an attack from the west." Hooker's second action was to send orders to Sedgwick – "attack the enemy in his front" at Fredericksburg if "an opportunity presents itself with a reasonable expectation of success" – and Sickles – "advance cautiously toward the road followed by the enemy, and harass the movement as much as possible". Sedgwick did not take action from the discretionary orders. Sickles, however, was enthusiastic when he received the order at noon. He sent Birney's division, flanked by two battalions of Col. Hiram Berdan's U.S. sharpshooters, south from Hazel Grove to Catharine Furnace with orders to pierce the column and gain possession of the road.

The regiment's initial movement in the attack was hindered by one of the supporting batteries cutting the regiment's column in two. After much arguing, the regiment was able to regroup and advance south. Their division, Birney's, moved south down Furnace Road and the thick forest on either side. The Maine soldiers noted Berdan's men slipping through the heavy undergrowth on the flanks of the column. Just south of the furnace, the column made contact with the enemy.

The attack came too late to deliver a blow to Jackson's force. The 3rd Brigade, including the 17th, which found the rearguard of Jackson's column. This action elicited a "brisk shelling by the enemy." This rearguard was the 23rd Georgia Infantry who resisted the advance of Birney and Berdan at Catherine Furnace. The Georgians were driven south and made a stand at the same unfinished railroad bed used by Wright's Brigade the day before. They were overwhelmed by 5 p.m. and most were captured. Two brigades from A.P. Hill's division turned back from the flanking march and prevented any further damage to Jackson's column, which by now had left the area. In this action out in front of the main Federal lines, the 17th had a few men wounded. (Note: Many writers placed III Corps' division movement south away from the rest of the army as the blame for the defeat. The historian, John Bigelow, back in 1910, made note that Howard's lack of action after Hooker's warning must, however, bear the greatest weight.)

As the remainder of the enemy stiffened, preventing further advance, the men of the regiment along with their division were now about two miles south of the Orange Plank Road with their right flank unguarded. The division withdrew a short distance expecting to bivouac there for the night. The men felt they had done well, driving the enemy and capturing the 23rd Georgia and its colors.

Hooker had misread the situation and thought that Jackson and the rest of the Army of Northern Virginia was in retreat towards Richmond. Most of Jackson's men were unaware of the small action at the rear of their column. As they marched north on Brock Road, Jackson was prepared to turn right on the Orange Plank Road, from which his men would attack the Union lines at around Wilderness Church. However, it became apparent that this direction would lead to essentially a frontal assault against Howard's line. Fitzhugh Lee met Jackson, and they ascended a hill with a sweeping view of the Union position. Jackson saw XI Corps resting, unaware of the impending Confederate threat.

===== Jackson's attack =====
At 5:30 p.m., Jackson caved in XI Corps and routed it. The reconnaissance had drawn the 17th and its corps further away from XI on their right. In response, Sickle's pulled Birney and the rest of his corps back to Hazel Grove, yet still in advance of the Plank Road. Hazel Grove was a strong position that Lee needed to possess to link up with Jackson. After much hard fighting, the U.S. forces had stabilized such that the Army of the Potomac lay between Jackson to the west and Lee to the east.

The men in the regiment were puzzled and disheartened at the order to withdraw. They had thought they had done well and had a chance to pursue a defeated enemy. They only realized the dire straits that the army was in as they returned to the vicinity of the Orange Plank Road. In 1866, Houghton wrote:

"The sunset was piling its temples of fire, of blood and amethyst over the forests and hills, that seemed to touch the flaming west, and the shades of evening began to envelope our little band ere the truth became fully apparent to the rank and file, of the desperate nature of our situation. Stout hearts sank, and bronzed faces grew stern, but not an arm flinched, not a whisper of misgiving or doubt was heard. Staff officers dashed furiously back and forth, and communicated their orders in an undertone: 'The plank road must be regained before daylight.' "

Sickles, unsure whether to conform to the retreat to the other side of the crossroads or hold his strong position in Hazel Grove, had last heard from Hooker before the collapse on the right, about 5 p.m. He sent his assistant adjutant-general, with a small mounted escort to reopen communications. This party returned with orders for Sickles to hold Hazel Grove. He sent them back to tell Hooker that a portion of Whipple's 3rd Division's ammunition (mule) train, some of the caissons of his batteries, and two or three of his cannon were in the woods occupied by the enemy, between III Corps and the Plank Road. Sickles wanted to recover these, as well as the line of the Plank Road with a night attack, if supported by the line of Williams' and Berry's divisions. The men of the 17th bivouacked in a field on the slope facing the Confederates just west northwest of the grove.

Meanwhile, remnants of the XI Corps and Couch's II Corps began a push west along Orange turnpike to come up on Sicle's right flank. During this attack they were rebuffed by Lane's brigade in Hill's Division. Jackson, however, was badly wounded in a friendly fire incident in the shadows of the woods on the clear night with a full moon. Men of the 33rd North Carolina thinking the oncoming horsemen shadows of horsemen galloping in their direction to avoid fire from the Federal attack thought they were attacking U. S. Army cavalry and opened fire. Command of the Second Corps fell to Maj. Gen. A.P. Hill who himself was soon wounded. Hill consulted with Brig. Gen. Robert E. Rodes, the next most senior in the corps, and Rodes acquiesced in Hill's decision to summon the cavalry commander Maj. Gen. J.E.B. Stuart to take command, notifying Lee and Jackson after the fact.

===== Sickles' night attack =====
To make ready for his attack if Hooker agreed, Sickles made III Corps ready. After dusk, on the night of May 2, the 17th Maine was temporarily placed under command of Gen. Ward's 2nd brigade along with the 63rd Pennsylvania from the 1st Brigade, and assigned to a column under command of Col. Egan, 40th New York Volunteers, detailed for the night attack to regain the munitions and guns as well as the position along the Plank Road lost during the afternoon. Sickles expected Berry's 1st Division and Williams' 1st Division, XII Corps to support Birney on his right, but they never received word of the planned attack. Sickles soon received approval his night attack, and ordered Birney to advance. Birney 's 2nd (Ward's) and 3rd brigades s were formed one in rear of the other, or in two echelons. In the first line of the first echelon were the six regiments of the 2d brigade, except the 20th Indiana, which had not yet returned from its position south of the railroad cut. Egan's column formed at 9 p.m. and proceeded, the 40th New York being in the advance. The 17th and the 63rd Pennsylvania followed the 40th into the darkness caused by the dense woods on the narrow lane, running north through the thick woods from Hazel Grove to the Old Schoolhouse Orange Turnpike/Orange Plank Road, in column by company. The column advanced on the road and the open space on each side of it (known locally as the Vista). The other regiments in the first echelon (2nd brigade) formed a line of companies at deploying intervals, each company in column of fours as they advanced through the undergrowth. The second echelon, consisting of the four remaining regiments of the 3rd brigade was about 100 yards in rear of the first, and, also in company columns of fours at deploying intervals. As the lines advanced by the light of the moon, all were under orders, with bayonets fixed and pieces uncapped, with orders not to fire until the Plank Road and Slocum's Log Works were reached.

There were no skirmishers or ground scouts in advance, and the enemy's position had not been located. All the officers on the road and in the woods had dismounted and continued on foot as there was not enough road for the horses and riding through the woods was impracticable. The column on the road had to change from column of companies upon reaching the end of the Vista, into a column of fours. Leaving the moonlight and entering the darkness of the shadows from the woods, the force had advanced only a short distance when it made contact and received a very brisk fire from the enemy. Alongside the infantry, Rebel artillery sent shells into the woods. (Note: The historian, Gary Gallagher has noted on several occasions that this was a common, effective tactic of both U.S. Army and Rebel artillery during the war that added wood splinters and falling limbs to the mortal danger of troops passing through a wood. In the twentieth century, this tactic became known as firing "tree burst.") As well, companies on the right of the attack ran into XII Corps units pushing west against Trimble's Division. (Note: The company on the right charged a battery of the XII Corps before they discovered that they were attacking friendly forces.) The force found that the Confederates were using breastworks that the XI Corps had built earlier that day and added an abattis in front of the works.

The fire was heavy on the federal forces in the woods, but overwhelming on the column in the road who were clear of any obstructions to the Rebels' fire save the darkness. Confused soldiers in the column disobeyed orders and loaded and discharged their weapons in the direction of the enemy, but inadvertently fired into the rear of the companies ahead of them. In the darkness, fire from both sides of the road, fire from their front, and the crash of artillery sent the 40th New York companies at the head of the column running through the lines of the 17th causing confusion and disorder. All but the last two companies in the column broke. These two companies stood firm and formed the foundation around which the column recovered, and formed a line of battle. As they reformed and regrouped, they found that the road's lower elevation than the adjacent fields and woods had inadvertently protected them from fire and that the column, while thrown into confusion, had not actually suffered any losses.

The column formed its line parallel to the road and fired northwest and north into the woods with the 63rd Pennsylvania on its right and the 40th returning to the left flank. The 17th Maine opened a heavy fire on the Rebels. By 2 a.m., on May 3, however, lacking the expected support from Berry and Williams, Birney found he was unable to hold his position in the woods south of the road. He withdrew his command, and the 17th returned to its bivouac by Hazel Grove. The fire from the Rebels prevented them from recovering their dead and wounded from the woods and the road. In this fight, the regiment lost one man killed, seven wounded, and eighteen missing in the night.

In this action, the men of the 17th managed to recover one brass cannon and four rifled guns that had been taken by the Confederates during the afternoon. The five pieces were drawn back and delivered to Capt. Randolph, by a detachment of the 17th. Gen. Ward highly complimented the 17th regiment in this affair, as shown by extract from his official report.

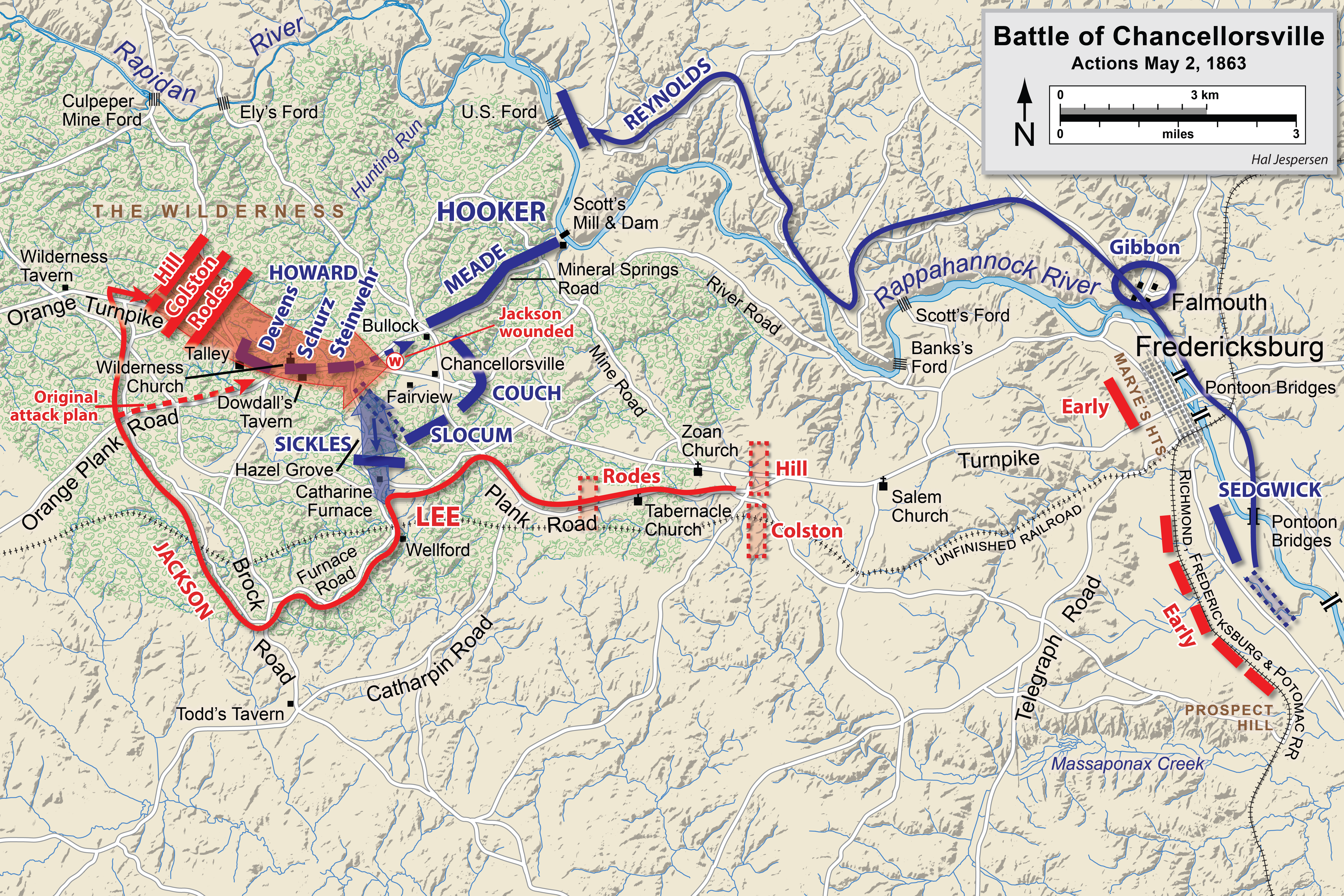
Ection on May 2.

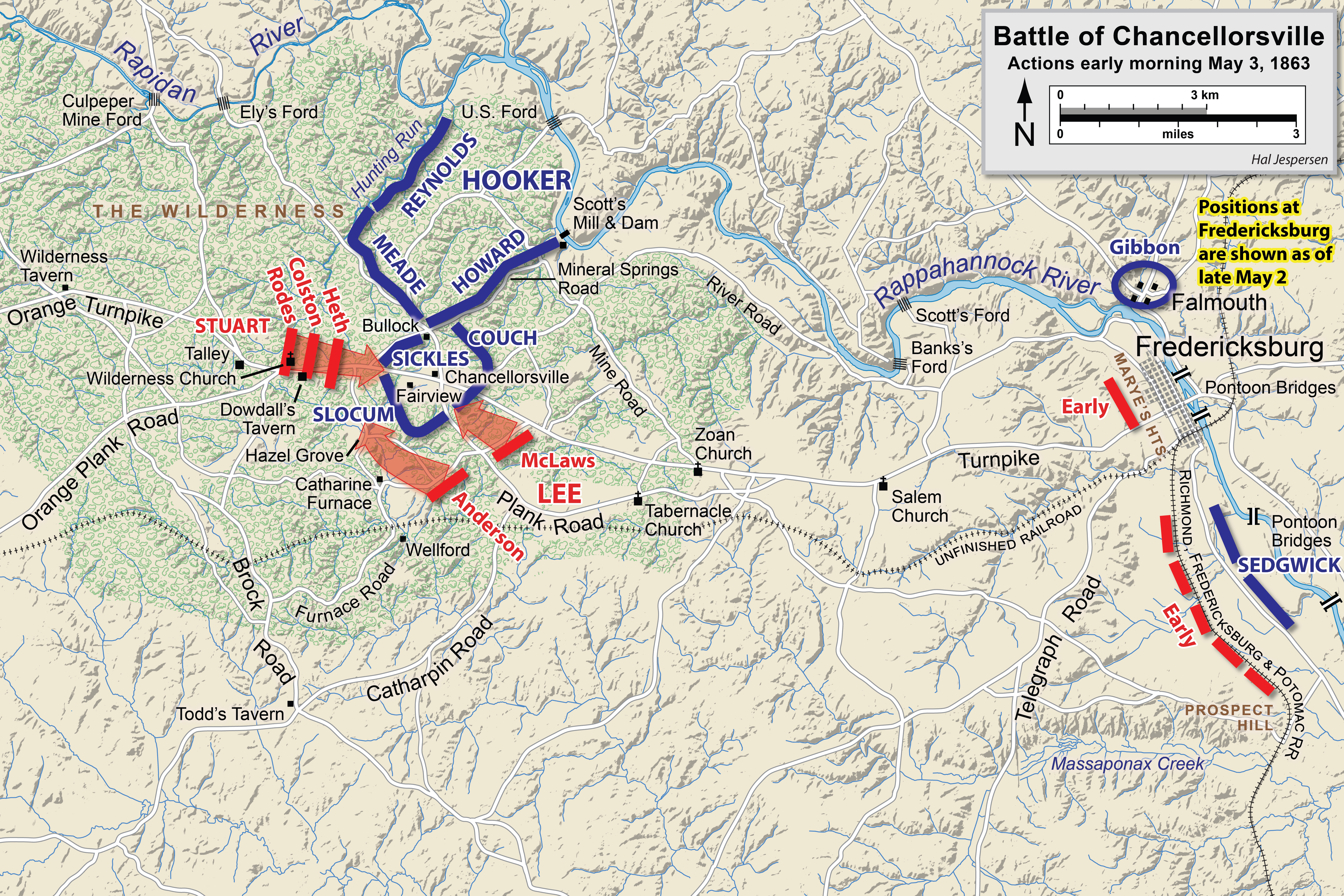
Initial positions on May 3.

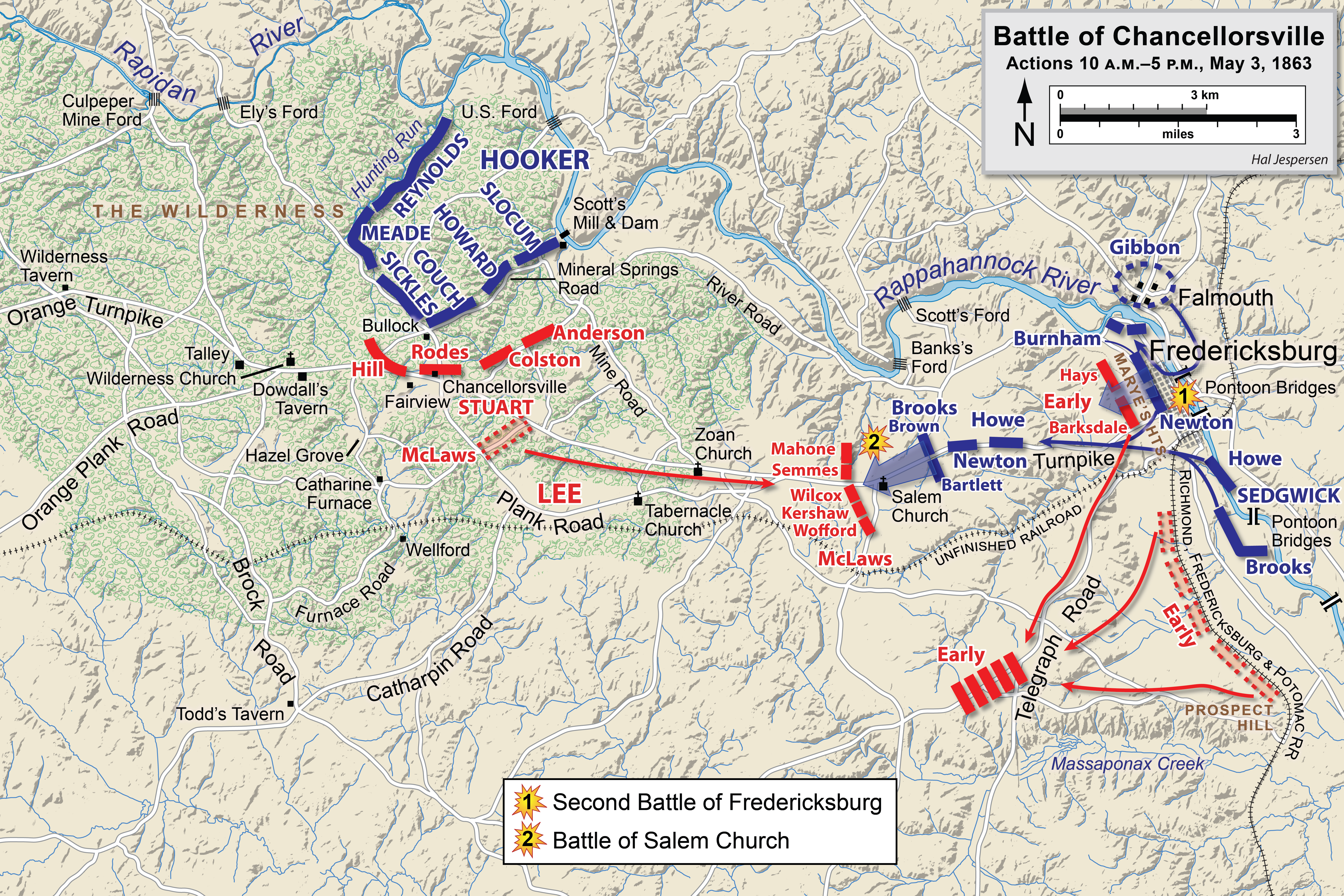
III Corps and the rest of the Army of the Potomac positions May 3 through 6.

===== Rebel assaults =====
Lee knew that he had to unite his main force and Jackson's corps, now under Stuart. III and V Corps were between the two forces and Lee knew he had to eliminate that force between his troops. At 3:00 a.m., on May 3, he ordered Stuart to renew his attacks as early as possible, expecting heavy action. Hooker actually saved Lee a bloody assault when he ordered Sickles to fall back to the Plank Road. Stuart seized the departure of the 17th and III Corps from Hazel Grove and quickly placed artillery in III Corps' former strong position. Beginning about 5:30 a.m. supported by the newly installed artillery at Hazel Grove, Stuart launched a series of assaults on the U. S. Army positions around the crossroads. Fierce resistance by III, XII, and II Corp behind strong earthworks led to the heaviest of the campaign, and the 17th Maine was in the thick of it.

The 17th rejoined its brigade and spent the early morning in front of the Chancellor House supporting batteries on Fairview Hill. Unfortunately for the men of the 17th and their comrades, Confederate guns on Hazel Grove were joined by 20 more on the Plank Road to duel effectively with the U. S. guns on neighboring Fairview Hill, causing the Federals to withdraw as ammunition ran low and Confederate infantrymen picked off the gun crews. Being exposed to this heavy crossfire of artillery and musketry caused the men of the 17th great suffering. The regiment, in position to repel an attack on the hill, gave time for the removal of the artillery. The action was heated. The regiment received constant rifle and artillery fire. Regimental historian, Edwin B. Houghton had a Rebel shell explode beneath his horse throwing him a distance unhurt but covered in the blood and tissue of his steed.

Hooker and his army were actually holding and making Lee pay dearly for every bit of ground gained. Hooker was active, moving to and fro, directing his subordinates when at 9:30 a.m., a spent Rebel shell hit a column, knocking him senseless and rendering him hors de combat. Fairview was evacuated at that time, briefly recaptured in a counterattack, but by 10 a.m. it was abandoned for good. The loss of this artillery platform doomed the Union position at the Chancellorsville crossroads as well, and the Army of the Potomac began a fighting retreat to positions circling United States Ford. (Note: The engineer battalion had constructed earthworks north of Chancellorsville the night of May 2.) The soldiers of the two halves of Lee's army reunited shortly after 10 a.m. (Note: At about 7:30 a.m., the 17th Maine's former brigade commander, Maj. Gen. Berry was killed by Confederate musket fire while leading his 2nd Division.) But the regiment retired with the brigade and went to the support of the batteries in the Army of the Potomac's center. Veterans of the regiment claimed afterwards to be the last unit to leave the positions in front of the Chancellor house. The men of the 17th were struck by how the Rebel attacks kept coming and were impressed by the presence and activities of Hooker and Sickles.

Confusion was rife in the AoP while Hooker was incapacitated. Several units began retreating. At one point, Lt. Col. Merrill marched three of the regiment's companies three miles back to U.S. Ford before the brigade commander Col. Hayman recalled them. Hayman's regiment, the 37th New York under Lt. Col Gilbert Riordan had also retreated and Hayman recalled them as well. He later criticized them in his after action report. Merrill wrote in his report that the 2nd Brigade "was ordered from the field to the [U.S. Ford] road in the rear of the large brick [Chancellor] house." As the historian Brian Swartz has written, Merrill neglected to mention how far back he had fallen. While some of the regiment criticized the movement, some of the men who had remained on the line noted that the fighting was over when this occurred and said the companies "became detached and wandered down to the river ... [and they] must have got lost again on their way back, as they didn't arrive until about 4:00 p.m."

On the evening of May 3 and all day May 4, Hooker remained in his defenses north of Chancellorsville. The 17th in its division positions were behind a double line of breastworks supported by artillery. Occasional Rebel musketry and artillery fired on the regiment's positions, but no assaults came. The regiment was eventually relieved by the 20th Indiana and retired to the rear.

When Lee saw that Hooker was threatening no offensive action, he turned on Sedgwick's troops to the east. By this time Sedgwick had placed his divisions into a strong defensive position with its flanks anchored on the Rappahannock, three sides of a rectangle extending south of the Plank Road. The Rebels reoccupied Marye's Heights on the morning of May 4, cutting Sedgwick off from the town. Lee attacked him around 6 p.m pushing back Sedgwick's left-center across the Plank Road. Throughout the day on May 4, Hooker provided no assistance or useful guidance to Sedgwick. Outnumbered, Sedgwick withdrew across the Rappahannock at Banks's Ford during the pre-dawn hours of May 5.

Tuesday, May 5, proved to be a dreary, rainy day that saw the two armies facing each other in static positions. When Hooker learned that Sedgwick had retreated back over the river, Hooker felt he was out of options to save the campaign, and on the night of May 5–6, the army withdrew back across the river at U.S. Ford. The rain had swollen the river so much that engineers had to use the two existing pontoon bridges at U.S. Ford to make one long enough to cover the increased width of the river. On that Tuesday, Col. Roberts returned and assumed command, and early on the 6th, the 17th Maine withdrew across the river without any loss of men, and returned to its camp at Falmouth near Potomac Creek.

===== Aftermath =====
Despite the temporary absence of Merrill and three companies, the 17th Maine had fought hard and well, but at a cost. It suffered 113 men killed, wounded, and missing out of about 625 in action. (Note: Hodsdon's report lists one commissioned officer and three enlisted men killed., five commissioned officers and fifty-nine enlisted men. wounded, and forty-five taken prisoner) Upon the regiment's return to Camp Sickles, on Wednesday, May 6, Colonel Roberts resigned command due to illness. Lieutenant Colonel Charles B. Merrill stepped up to command the regiment.

Merrill's departure from the colors during the battle sowed discord among the officers of the regiment. As soon as he assumed command, the majority of the officers felt that he had been shown lacking at Chancellorsville despite the commendation of Ward for his performance on the night attack of May 2–3. As Swartz notes, these disaffected officers thought the third regimental officer, Maj. George Warren West, who felt he deserved the command, was the proper choice for commander, and they began a campaign through letters to Augusta to replace Merill with West. This effort was endorsed by the departed Roberts who had fallen out with Merrill. This campaign would prove successful in the fall, but Lee's actions would not let the 17th remain in camp for long.

==== Gettysburg campaign ====
The 17th Maine, its brigade, division, and corps had significant losses at Chancellorsville; the regiment lost a little under a fifth and the corps overall about a quarter. (Note: III Corps had taken 17,568 men, including non-combatants, on that campaign, losing 378 killed, 2,634 wounded, and 1,090 missing; total 4,102. It had also lost two of its generals; Berry and Whipple were among those killed.) The depleted ranks were still further lessened by the loss of four New York regiments whose two years term of enlistment had expired (including the 17th's brigademates, the 1st and 37th New York); (Note: On Monday morning, April 15, 1861, the New York legislature had passed a bill for the enrollment of thirty thousand volunteer Militia to serve for two years. These two regiments were part of that enlistment. The local authorities In New York did not foresee the war lasting longer.) in addition, the division of nine month troops had gone home. The corps was accordingly consolidated into two divisions; the 1st under General David B. Birney, and the 2nd under General Andrew A. Humphreys, an able officer who had distinguished himself as a division commander at Fredericksburg. The time after Chancellorsville was spent rearming and resupplying.

With the loss of the two New York two-year regiments, the reorganization gave the 3rd brigade the 110th Pennsylvania from the 2nd Brigade of Whipple's 3rd Division (no longer in existence) and the 40th New York as an intra-division transfer from the 2nd Brigade (of note, III Corps 2nd division also had the 1st and 2nd United States Sharpshooters assigned to it). While smaller, II Corps had veteran units. One of the commanders of a departing New York two-year militia regiment, Col P. Régis de Trobriand, extended his service and took over command of the brigade. (Note: Philippe Régis Denis de Keredern de Trobriand (June 4, 1816 – July 15, 1897) was a French aristocrat, lawyer, poet, and novelist who, on a dare, emigrated in his 20s to the United States, settling first in New York City. The son of a baron who had been a general in Napoleon Bonaparte's army, was from a family with a long tradition of military service. Unfortunately for him, service in the French army was closed to him due to his family's service under Charles X. Upon arrival in New York, he immediately became popular as a bon vivant with the social elite of New York City. Marrying an heiress Mary Mason Jones, he earned a living as a poet, novelist, and writer and editor for French-language publications in America. After the Civil War broke out, Trobriand became a naturalized citizen of the United States and on August 28, 1861, he was commissioned as an officer and given command of the 55th New York Infantry Regiment, the predominantly French-immigrant regiment known as the Gardes de Lafayette. Taking part in the 1862 Peninsula Campaign, seeing first combat on May 5, 1862, at the Battle of Williamsburg. Soon after, Trobriand caught malaria, and was unable to return to duty until July. His next engagement at the Battle of Fredericksburg. In December 1862, the 55th was merged with the 38th New York Infantry Regiment, and Trobriand became the colonel of the now-named 38th. He led his new regiment at the Battle of Chancellorsville in May 1863, but was not heavily engaged.)

===== The Rebels move to the Shenandoah =====
On Thursday, June 11, the 17th was alerted to prepare to move. Hooker had received reports of Confederate infantry on the other side of the Blue Ridge Mountains but believed Lee had slipped northwest along the Rappahannock. On Friday morning, the regiment was on the march to the northwest. Despite the warm weather and dusty roads, there was very little straggling, and after fifteen miles, at 10:30 p.m., it bivouacked near Hartwood Church. Resuming the march Saturday morning at 8:00 a.m., it made a rigorous twenty-two-mile march to Bealton Station, on the Orange and Alexandria Railroad. This leg of their journey, conducted during the high June heat of the day over very dusty roads, exhausted the troops who nevertheless were in readiness to march at 4:00 a.m. on Sunday, June 14. Luckily for the regiment, they were able to recoup during the day because the order to move did not arrive until 6:00 p.m. A six-hour march via Licking Creek and Warrenton Junction to Catlett's Station, where they stopped at midnight. Despite the more productive marching in the evening the following morning saw the march take place during the high heat and humidity of midday. Before nightfall over 8,000 men of III Corps fell behind the column, and many died from sunstroke.

III Corps arrived near Manassas Junction at 5:00 p.m. The Army of the Potomac remained in that vicinity for a little over a week while Hooker sent his cavalry to try to pierce the Confederate cavalry screen to locate Lee's army, leading three minor cavalry battles from June 17 through June 21 in the Loudoun Valley The regiment learned of the loss of Col. Calvin S. Doughty, commander of the 1st Maine Cavalry at one of these actions at Aldie when they reached Gum Springs. The 17th and its companions in the army spent their time near Manassas and then slightly northwest at Gum Springs drilling and re-equipping.

Hooker was surprised on Thursday, June 25, when he learned that Lee had crossed the Potomac River. In response, he got his army moving into Maryland. The 17th would march to Frederick with the army to concentrate there, except for Slocum's XII Corps who went to Middletown. At 3:30 p.m., on Thursday, the 17th crossed the Potomac across a 1,800foot-long pontoon bridge at Edward's Ferry.

===== Friendly territory =====
After crossing the river, the regiment continued another fifteen miles in a heavy rain along the Chesapeake and Ohio canal. After the nearly 35 mile march, the highest record of the regiment, few of the exhausted men pitched tents but fell asleep in the rain at 11:300 p.m. The regiment was on the road again at 5:00 a.m. on Friday, June 26. The day turned out to be a beautiful day with a clear blue sky as the regiment through Jeffersonville through to camp two miles beyond it to the north. The men were quite surprised at the positive, warm attitude of the locals after the harsh bitterness of their interactions with Virginians over the previous eight months.

The next day, Saturday, another rainless but hazy day, the regiment continued north to Middletown. III Corps had made a concession to the heat and continued its series of having its units make short, marches and on Sunday, June 28, the 17th passed through Frederick and seven miles further north where they stopped. During the day they continued to be received warmly not only by the local black population, free and enslaved, but by the white population as well. They learned that the Rebels had passed along the same route only two days before. Upon their stop for the night, the regiment and the rest of the army soon learned that Hooker had been relieved by Maj. Gen. Meade.

Upon entering Maryland they had found the roads, untouched by warfare, to better maintained and easier to traverse. Another added factor was that as they moved north, the roads were macadamized which led to easier and faster movement. On Monday, June 29, this factor played a role in the regiment accomplishing a twenty-mile march to Taneytown. Once in bivouac, the regiment received their quarterly pay, new shoes, ammunition, and replacement for any worn out uniforms or equipment. The regiment spent Tuesday morning in camp until midday when they marched a short distance, leaving the macadam roads for a plank road, to the town of Emmetsburg, two miles from the Pennsylvania state line.

===== First day of battle =====
The morning of Wednesday, July 1, was cloudy, with signs of rain. At 9:00 a.m. the tents were struck, and the regiment fell in line waiting for orders. At about 12:00 p.m. it began raining, and it was not until 2:00 p.m. that it was marching. They traveled only about two miles and encamped in a field adjoining the grounds of Daughters of Charity Convent at Emmitsburg, MD, about 11 miles south of Gettysburg. They bivouacked in the same area that XI Corps had spent the night two days before. As they had with all units of the AoP passing before, the nuns at the Emmitsburg convent (Note: In 1809, Elizabeth Ann Seton accepted the Sulpicians' invitation and moved to Emmitsburg. A year later, she established the Saint Joseph's Academy and Free School dedicated to Catholic girls' education with help from Samuel Sutherland Cooper, a wealthy convert and seminarian at the newly established Mount Saint Mary's University, begun by John Dubois, S.S., and the Sulpicians. She established the convent, the first congregation of religious sisters founded in the United States, and its school, dedicated to the care of the children of the poor, the first free Catholic school in America. This modest beginning marked the start of the Catholic parochial school system in the United States. Initially called the Sisters of Charity of St. Joseph's, in 1811, the sisters adopted the rules of the Daughters of Charity, co-founded in France by Vincent de Paul and Louise de Marillac.), the nuns served them soft bread and sweet milk. The men of the regiment were impressed with the convent and the nearby St Mary's College.

The regiment, as part of de Trobriand's brigade was kept at St Joseph's, along with Burling's Brigade and a light battery, as a guard against a rebel cavalry attack from Fairfield Gap while the rest of III Corps pushed on to Gettysburg. During the day, they started receiving word of a building battle north at Gettysburg. Eventually news of Reynolds' death and the mauling suffered by I and XI Corps arrived by nightfall.

===== Second day of battle =====
At 2:00 a.m., July 2, De Trobriand's Brigade and its comrades received orders to march and rejoin their division and III Corps. The 17th's pickets, which had been advanced quite a distance, were immediately withdrawn. The 17th was turned out at 3:00 a.m, and ordered to get breakfast but had nothing available except for coffee. Shortly afterwards, before they could make their coffee, a new order came for the regiment to move. By 4:30;a.m., the 17th had broken camp and shortly before 5:00 a.m., the regiment and its brigade were on the road. III Corps' ammunition train was also traveling with the two brigades and the battery. The day was turning out pleasant, partly overcast and in the low 70s. Since no time had been allowed for breakfast, de Trobriand halted the brigade after about five miles for coffee, but yet another order came before the water got warm to get on the road lest the Rebels got between the brigades and the rest of the army. As the 17th crossed into Pennsylvania, the troops greeted the free soil of the north with cheers and much enthusiasm.

====== Arrival ======
As they entered Gettysburg at 10:00 a.m., Confederate bullets from their left whistled over their heads as they marched. After marching about nine miles up the Emmitsburg Road, the 17th turned right off the Emmitsburg road and down Wheatfield Road through Sherfy's Peach Orchard. Once through the orchard, they caught up with III Corps who were already in line of battle with a portion of their skirmish line engaged. The regiment was placed in reserve just north of the road slightly east and south of the Peach Orchard, supporting the skirmish line of the 3rd Michigan. De Trobriand had two regiments at the front, to the left of the latter,- the 5th Michigan, whose skirmishers connected to the 3rd, near the Rose barn, and the 110th Pennsylvania, a small regiment. The largest regiment in the brigade, the 40th New York, was in the wood, in reserve, behind these..

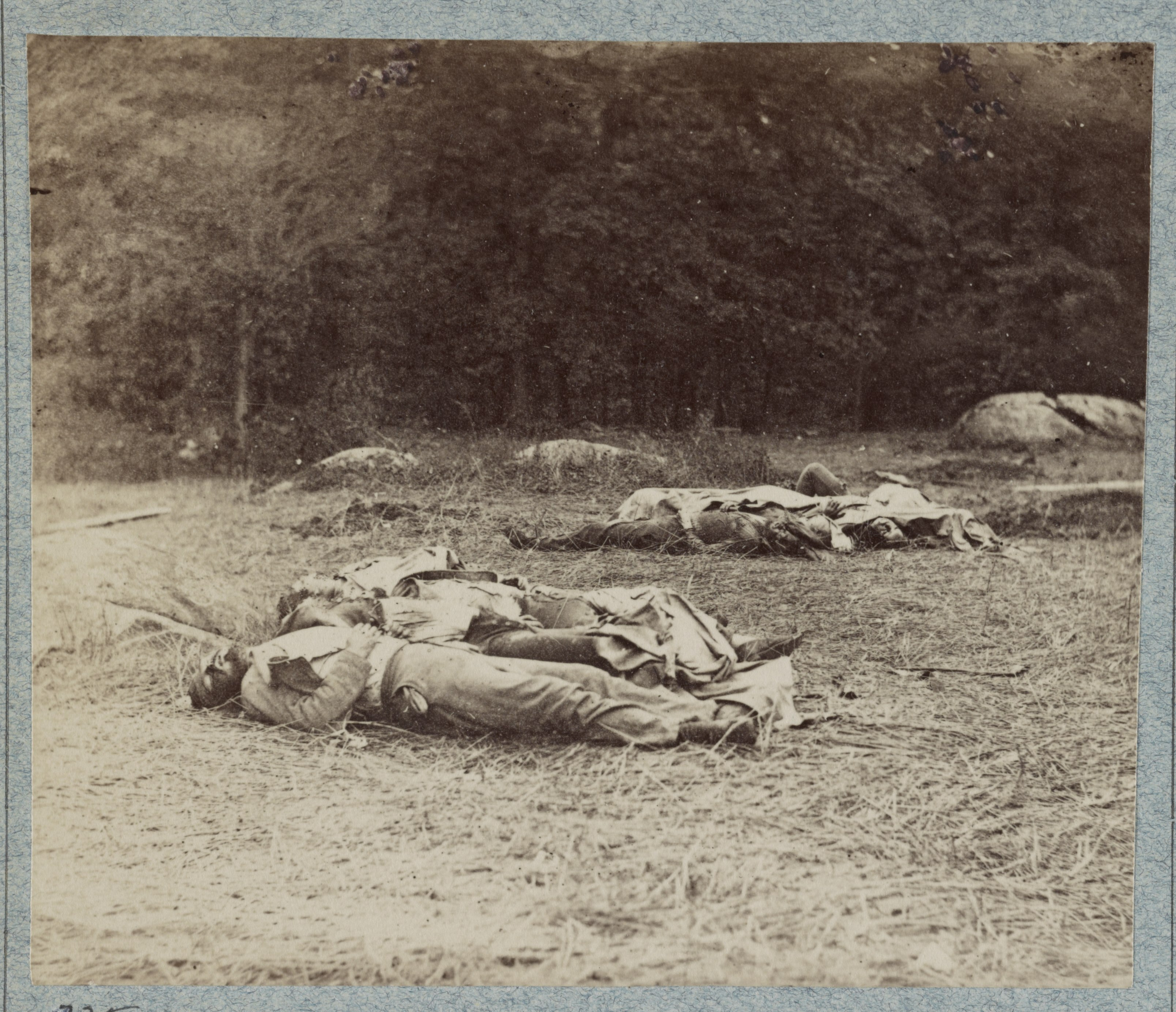
Dead confederates in a field on the Rose Woods.

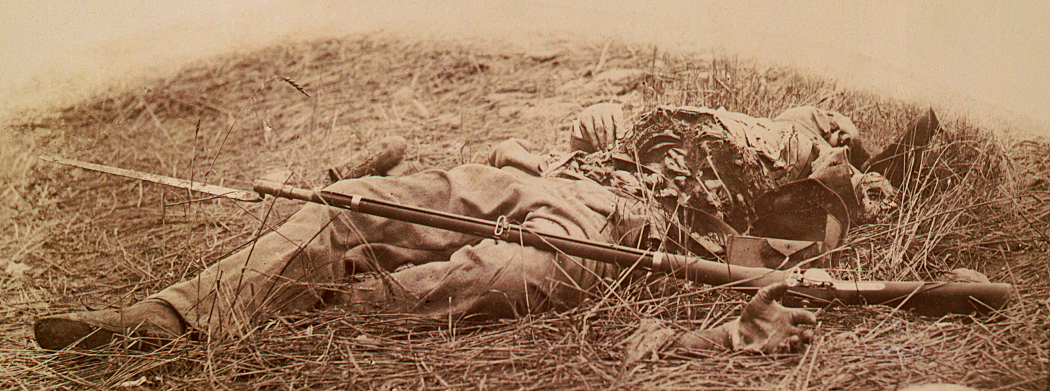
Soldier killed by artillery fire on the southwestern edge of the Rose Woods, near the Wheatfield.

The arrival of the 350 men was a close-run thing and happened as Longstreet was marshaling his forces to attack the AoP's left across the very road they had just taken. The regiment later realized that a delay of fifteen minutes would have cut them off from the main army, as barely that much time had elapsed after their arrival before the Rebels had possession of the road by which they advanced.

When they joined their corps, the men in the 17th were ignorant of the vulnerable position they were in. When Sickles had arrived late in the prior day, Meade instructed him to place III Corps in position on Cemetery Ridge that linked up with the II Corps on his right and anchored his left on Little Round Top. Sickles originally did so, but after 12:00 p.m., July 2, he became concerned about a slightly higher piece of ground 0.7 miles (1,100 m) to his front, Sherfy's orchard. Recalling Chancellorsville, where he vacated Hazel Grove's high ground only to have it used against him as a deadly Confederate artillery platform, he acted without authorization from Meade and pushed his corps forward occupy the peach orchard. This had two significant negative consequences: his position now took the form of a salient, which could be attacked from multiple sides; and he was forced to occupy lines that were much longer than his two-division corps could defend. Meade rode to the III Corps position and impatiently explained "General Sickles, this is neutral ground, our guns command it, as well as the enemy's. The very reason you cannot hold it applies to them." Meade was furious about this insubordination, but it was too late to do anything about it—the Confederate attack was imminent.

After several changes of position, III Corps' line was finally formed at about 3:00 p.m. as two sides of a triangle with a tail dropping south on a ridge just west of Plum Run. Birney's 1st Division took up the left of III Corps, the left, southwestern facing side of the triangle dropping south on the ridge just west of Plum Run, with Brig. Gen. Humphreys' 2nd Division on its right, the other side of the salient along Emmitsburg Road and Ward's. De Trobriand's Brigade was the left angle of the apex with a gap between him and Ward's 2nd Brigade on the ridge. Graham's 1st Brigade was on De Trobriand's right reaching to the Peach Orchard.

Burling's 3rd Brigade from the 2nd Division sent their white diamond badged 115th Pennsylvania and 8th New Jersey to the left of de Trobriand on the east slope of Stony Hill, a wooded and rocky elevation just west of Plum Run and south of the Wheatfield Road. II Corps' lines were scarcely in position, when the signal station on Round Top, reported heavy columns to the army's left flank.

====== Initial assaults ======
When the Confederates in Maj. Gen. Hood's division, launched their attack to take Little Round Top, de Trobriand and his brigade could not see their lines move forward because Rose's Woods blocked their view. The colonel and his men could hear it and estimate its positions and progress eastward. Soon, U.S. Army officers heard the battle sounds get nearer as Hood's men, now under the command of Brig. Gen. Evander M. Law, (Note: Law replaced Hood who had been severely wounded almost immediately after he gave the order to attack.) began to make contact with Ward's brigade on the ridge between the Wheatfield (Note: The area known as the Wheatfield had three geographic features, all owned by the John Rose family: the 20 acre (8 ha) field itself, Rose Woods bordering it on the west, and a modest elevation known as Stony Hill, also to the west. Immediately to the southeast was Houck's Ridge and to the south Devil's Den. The fighting here, consisting of numerous confusing attacks and counterattacks over two hours by eleven brigades, earned the field the nickname "Bloody Wheatfield.") and Devil's Den.

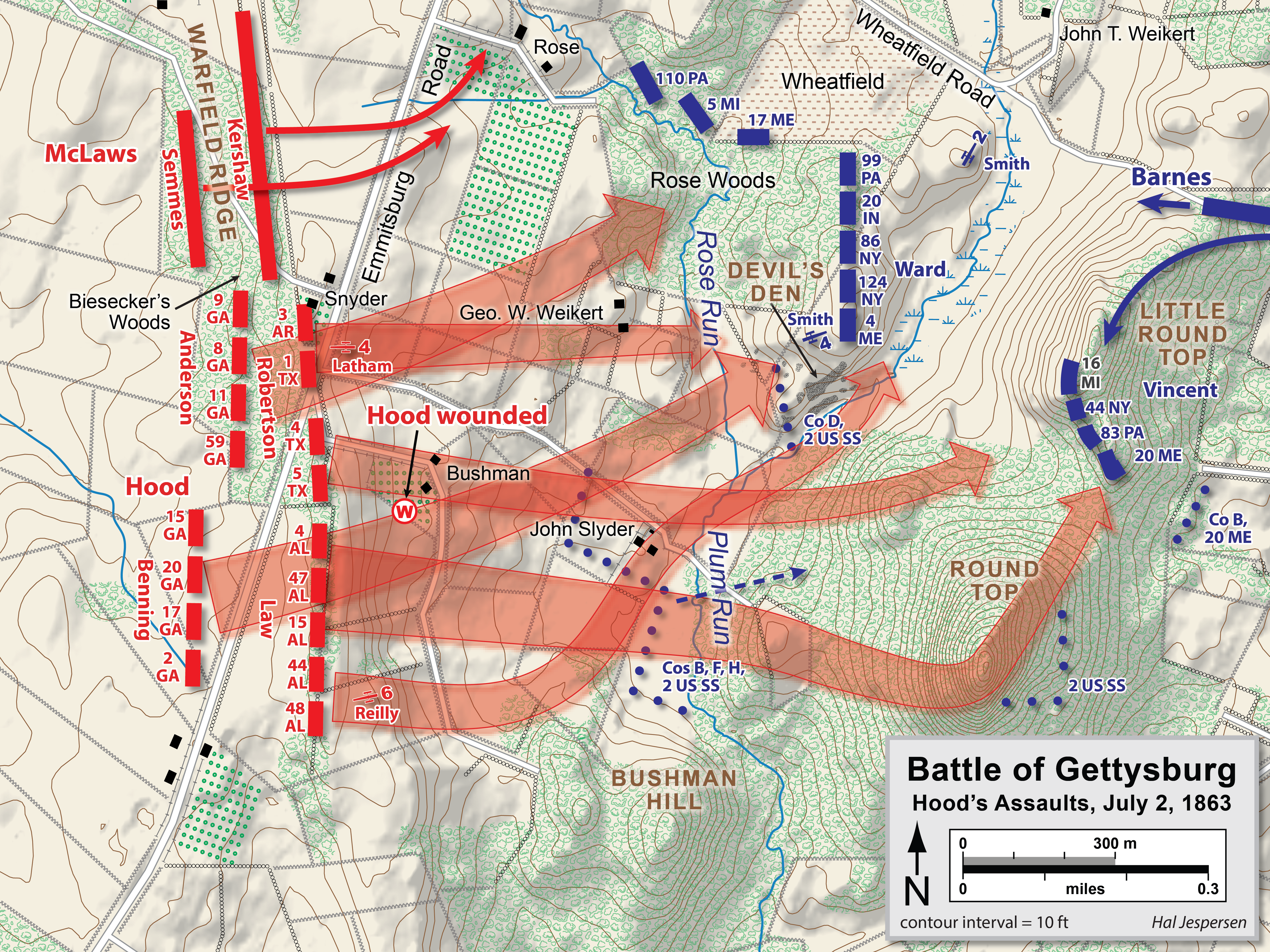
The first wave of Hood's assault, 17th Maine fires on flank of the 3rd Arkansas

In response, Birney, around 4:00 p.m., had de Trobriand move the 17th around Burling and forward to a strong position behind a stone wall at the southern edge of the wheatfield right next to Rose's Woods perpendicular to Ward's right flank occupied by the Ward's brigade with the 20th Indiana on its right flank. The regiment double-quicked east on the road and then across the field to the wall. De Trobriand also sent the 40th New York to block Plum Run on the right of the 17th with a 100-yard gap between them. (Note: De Trobriand's move of the 17th and 40th to his left had his brigade's right flank left open to the west, but Birney had assured him that brigades now arriving from V Corps would occupy the stony hill west of Plum Run to protect his troops.) As Brig. Gen. Robertson's brigade (Hood's old brigade) hit Ward, the 17th was able to help the 20th and the 99th Pennsylvania, who had formed between the 17th and 20th, by catching the 479 men of the 3rd Arkansas in its left flank and stopping it at a rock ledge in Rose's Wodds before it could reach Ward's line.

The 3rd Arkansas, advancing towards Ward, had struck the 17th's line of the Seventeenth obliquely; the Maine men overlapping its left flank, threw it into confusion by a spirited enfilading fire. The 3rd Arkansas' line recoiled. After a short delay, its commander, Col. Manning tried to make a change of front, but the noise and smoke made prevented his orders reaching everyone in his command. The regiment in turn made an obtuse partial refusal on its left following the line of the stonewall and fired back from a static line below the wall in the woods. Due to the 17th's heavy fire from the Wheatfield, the Manning pulled his men back. After regrouping and extending his left to match the 17th, Manning advanced again facing toward the stonewall. Manning's change of front brought in some of the 1st Texas whose left flank now extended past the 40th and to the 17th's left flank, but II Corps again savaged them and held. The 40th was pulled from its position between the 17th and the rest of its brigade and sent behind the 17th to Brig. Gen. Stephen H. Weed who sent it down toward Devil's Den behind his troops on the ridge; the 17th now had a substantial gap between it and its brigade in the woods on Stony Hill to its right. A little flushed with success, the 17th's position was now known to the Rebels who would soon be coming their way.

Meanwhile, Robertson began assessing the status of his brigade's attack. Hood's Division had attacked with its four brigades in two lines of two; Robertson and Brig. Gen. Law were in front with Brig. Gen. Anderson and Brig. Gen. Benning behind. Robertson was aware that his advance would stall without more support so he sent messengers back to Anderson and Benning asking for immediate assistance. Anderson sent word he would move up.

====== Anderson's attacks ======
Brig. Gen. Anderson's Georgia now came through Rose's Woods directly at the 17th. The Georgians advanced taking position on the left of Manning and the 3rd Arkansas. Despite outnumbering the regiment by more than five to one, the 17th repulsed them with heavy loss. Although a shade under three feet in height, the stonewall had the advantage of the ground continuing to slope through Rose's Woods making the Confederates attack uphill. The lack of trees in the field also let Merrill mass all his men and firepower on the wall in a solid line while Anderson's line was broken by the trees despite the cover offered by them. With the smoke and noise, Anderson had difficulty in massing his line to wield the superior firepower his numbers should have given him.

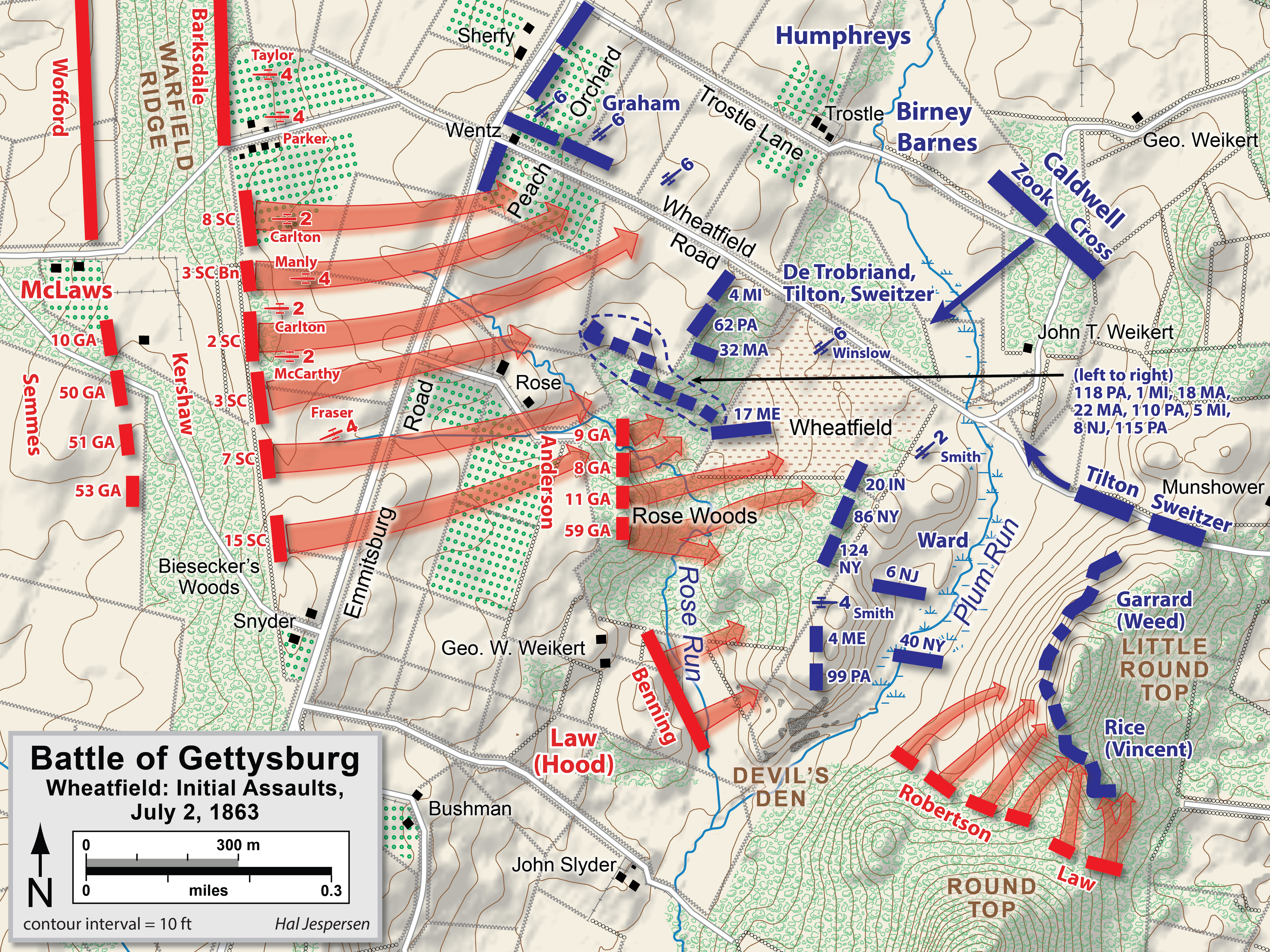
Initial Confederate assault on the Wheatfield, Robertson's brigade attacks north at the 17th.

When Robertson struck Ward's troops, Birney had ridden up to Capt. George B. Winslow's Battery D, 1st New York Light Artillery, at the rear of the wheat field and ordered it to join the 17th, who were in front of but below it, and, although they could not see the Rebels, support Ward by firing just over the 17th's heads at the sound of battle in the woods. Now, even though they still could not see the Rebels, they had a better idea of where the enemy was and soon their fire headstearing gaps in the Rebel lines in the woods. The artillery combined with the 17th's stone wall rebuffed several Rebel attempts to close with the Maine lines, but, with "a heroism worthy of a nobler cause," the Georgians kept assailing the 17th's strong position. Occasionally devolving to hand-to-hand combat, here and there, individual rebels got over the wall and fought until eliminated separated from their support by the wall. Hundreds were killed within three feet of the 17th's line, and many were bayoneted trying to get across the wall.

When frontal assault failed, the Rebels tried to flank the 17th and capture Winslow's battery across the field. This move initially succeeded, before the men of the regiment realized it. De Trobriand realized the danger and ordered the regiment to fall back, but they did not hear his order over the noise of battle. Once aware and in imminent danger of capture and a severe enfilading fire, Merrill refused the 17th's line with its three right companies, H, K, and C, forming along a rail fence perpendicular to the stone wall and separating the field from the marsh along Plum Run. The refusal would let them hit any Rebels with enfilading fire when they entered this gap. As the veterans of the 8th Georgia moved directly forward upon the 5th Michigan and 110th Pennsylvania, who received them face to face, this new line of the right wing of the 17th took them in flank. Galled by the three companies' fire, they changed front to match the flank line of H, K, and C. The 8th advanced again, thus exposing their left to the 5th Michigan who poured devastating volleys into them. Meanwhile, Anderson's men unaffected by the flanking fire, pressed forward again to the stonewall renewing the a desperate, close quarters struggle for this position. At the salient angle was company B, with H, K and C on the right and G - the color company, D, I, F, A and E along the stonewall on its right. The regiment received a heavy fire, particularly G, B and H, but all stood fast. Eventually, the regiment routed the enemy, some of whom were taken prisoners. On that portion of the III Corps line, the Rebels had made no impression. The fight had continued over an hour; many had fallen, but the 17th was confident in their success. After failure to take the wall and field, Anderson pulled back out of range to wait for reinforcements.

More Confederates kept coming. Around 5:00 p.m., the regiment finally renewed contact with de Trobriand who was still in possession of the Stony hill. At 5:30 p.m., when Brig. Gen. Kershaw's South Carolina brigade attacked, Col. William S. Tilton' s 1st and Col Jacob B. Sweitzer's 2nd Brigades of the troops of Brig. Gen. James Barnes' 1st Division, V Corps had arrived and had taken an excellent position on the right of de Trobriand, and assisted in repulsing the last previous assault on the other side of Stony Hill. Despite their good position, they were outnumbered and soon, Kershaw was through them. As Kershaw pushed up to the red and white diamond troops on the stony hill from the west, Anderson renewed his attack from the south. Kershaw's men soon pushed de Trobriand off the hill where and back to Wheatfield road leaving the 17th at the wall with Rebels in front, to the right, and behind them. The 17th again kept Anderson from his objective. Pushing ahead through de Trobriand's brigade aiming for a linkup with Anderson, a portion of Kershaw's men made for the west corner of the Wheatfield through the thick alder growth there which both impeded their rush and broke the solidity of their ranks. As they emerged through the alders within fifty paces of the flanking right wing of the Seventeenth, which awaited them at the rail fence, the three companies stopped them with heavy fire. Despite several attempts to rally, in a few minutes they gave it up and retreated out of sight. Although the 17th still drove off the Georgians and felt secure in their strong position at the wall, Kershaw's attack, forcing Tilton, Sweitzer; and de Trobriand away, in turn compelled the 5th Michigan and 110th Pennsylvania to move rearward. Kershaw thus gained lodgment in the woods west of the Wheatfield, considerably in the 17th's rear. Winslow's battery, out of ammunition and now vulnerable to musketry to its right, withdrew.

The regiment was thus left alone, far in advance of its brother regiments and well outflanked upon its right by Kershaw. In response, de Trobriand ordered them back to avoid encirclement. They reluctantly pulled back in a fighting withdrawal back across the wheatfield halting and regrouping on the crest of a ridge in the north west corner to catch their breath. The crest of the ridge had shielded Winslow from Anderson's musketry. Once on the ridge, the 17th found that Winslow had withdrawn out of ammunition and its brigade mates were reforming several hundred yards behind them. Men had been sent back for more ammunition as the men had twenty or less rounds remaining.

====== Birney leads ======
The Georgians now freely poured over the wall, and these confident veterans were readying to head up the slope to take Winslow's battery (unaware it had departed, they thought they were just protected by the slope of the wheat field). Ignorant that the 17th Maine was still a coherent entity almost completely screened by the crest, the Rebels expected that all they had to do to break the U.S. Army's line was to push up the slope through the handful of U.S. soldiers they could see through the smoke and capture the battery. If that happened, all U.S. forces along Emmitsburg Road would be forced to abandon their positions. With this in mind and unable to discern any intact infantry in the field, Birney rode over to the Wheatfield to see where his line was and send someone to stop Anderson's men thereby buying time for inbound reinforcements from II and V Corps to get in position. On the road side of the crest he found the 17th intact, although low on ammunition, and ordered the regiment to charge and drive the Rebels out of the wheat field. A handful of Rebels were coming into view nearing the crest of the ridge. With a mounted Birney at its head, the reformed regiment gave a cheer and charged over the crest at the stubborn Georgians and sent them in disordered retreat out of the field and over the wall foiling their attempt to capture the battery. Birney halted the regiment about half-way between the crest and the stonewall, where he ordered them to kneel and hold the position. Once the Georgians were back over the stone wall and in Rose's Woods, Birney had gained the breathing space necessary for the U.S. Army reinforcements arrival.

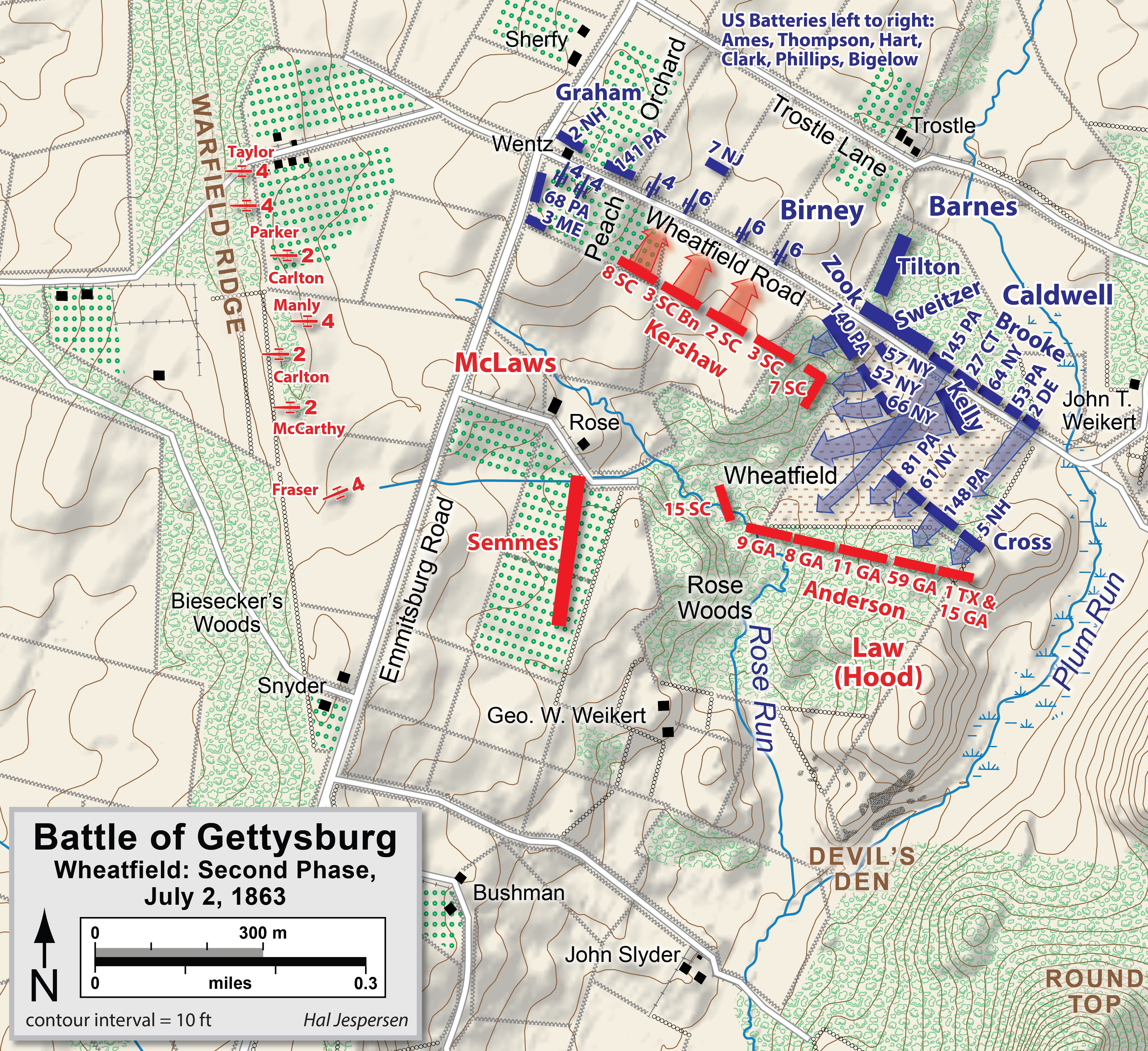
Caldwell's division relieves de Trobriand's brigade; the Irish Brigade advanced southwest through the 17th Maine's and 5th Michigan's lines relieving them.

Once the 17th drove the Georgians back into the woods and regained the crest of the ridge, Birney found out that Sickles had been wounded and he now commanded the corps. He quickly rode off to locate the divisions from the other corps so that he could push them forward to where the 17th remained. Despite its dire situation (most men were out of rounds or had but a handful left and they were still forward of any support on their flanks), the 17th drove back several more attempts by Anderson's brigade on the Wheatfield. Merrill told his men they would hold with bayonet only if necessary. Birney and de Trobriand had not forgotten the situation, and After ten to fifteen minutes de Trobriand rallied and led the 5th Michigan, still a cohesive unit, and a smaller group from the 110th Pennsylvania forward onto the 17th's right flank. (Note: Verill wrote years later: "Our regiment was entirely alone here for some After ten to fifteen minutes when the 5th Michigan came out of the woods and joined upon our right; possibly some of the 110th Pennsylvania and other scattered groups may have come up and joined upon the right of the 5th Michigan, certainly none joined upon the left of the 17th; altogether our little line amounted to a fair-sized regiment as regiments counted then." and in 1987, the historian, Harry Pfanz noted that de Trobriand recalled that one of Burling's New Jersey regiments (candidates being the 5th, 6th, 7th, and 8th) might have been involved in the action, but the Official Records do not reflect this.) At first content to remain behind the wall in the woods and fire at the 17th and its comrades in the open just below the crest, the Rebels gradually became more aggressive as small parties charged uphill through the smoke and grappled with the U.S. forces. Each time, the men of de Trobriand's brigade held their ground and drove them off. Around 6:30 p.m., Lieutenants Roberts and Verrill were wounded and sent to the rear. On their way, they passed through fresh troops in line of battle wearing the red trefoil of fellow Maine native, Brig. Gen. Caldwell's 1st Division, II Corps.

At 6:40 p.m., Caldwell's 1st Division, arrived to relieve the 17th, the 5th Michigan, and the 110th Pennsylvania. It was the second close call of the day as the regiment was almost completely out of ammunition. Led by Col Kelly, the Irish Brigade, the 2nd Brigade of Caldwell's division, swept down the slope of the Wheatfield in line of battle and through the 17th and 5th to drive the Rebels out of the field and continued partway into the woods. Upon relief, Caldwell relieved de Trobriand in the defense of the position and the 17th and 5th gathered their wounded and rejoined the survivors of their brigade in the rear.

====== Aftermath ======
Although fighting most of the time behind the wall, a testament to the severity of the fighting was the 17th losses in one hour of seventeen killed and eighty-four wounded. Of the color-guard, composed of ten noncommissioned officers, three only escaped uninjured. The regiment waited in battle line along the road expecting an imminent attack. By 7:00 p.m., after three hours' fighting, the regiment's ammunition was exhausted leaving only their bayonets to rely on. II and XII Corps reinforcements arrived in the nick of time letting the regiment fall back to get more ammunition. During the afternoon engagement the men had fought well, "with even more bravery, coolness, and determination than ever, now that they were upon northern soil." The men had given their army time and room to repair its line from the Confederate onslaught. The regiment's stand at the stone wall has been noted as just as much a component of the U.S. Army's eventual victory as that of their fellow Maine men in the 20th Maine at Little Round Top.

===== Third day of battle =====
The regiment spent the night taking stock of its and its brigade's situation. Since no rations were available, most men had collapsed into deep sleep after refilling their ammunition pouches. The 17th had suffered losses, but the 5th Michigan suffered the most in the brigade. Since the 3rd Michigan, had fought only as skirmishers, it came through the second day's battle with the least losses. De Trobriand assessed that he lost a clear third of his brigade. The 17th spent the night of July 2–3, in the woods on the reverse slope of the AoP's line on Cemetery Ridge alongside Taneytown Road.

Despite having held the advanced position where Sickles had placed III Corps at the end of the day, Meade, well aware of the dangers of remaining forward, brought army back to the Cemetery Ridge. III Corps was disposed in regular line on the Cemetery Heights between II and V Corps. VI Corps' arrival extended the AoP's front to Round Top, beyond Little Round Top.

====== The morning ======
At daybreak on Friday morning, July 3, Ewell's Confederate batteries opened on the right of the U.S. line, and were immediately answered by those of the AoP. This time the action began on the extreme right where during the night Ewell's Corps had succeeded in occupying breastworks on the lower slope of Culp's Hill that had been vacated the day prior by troops sent to shore up the army's line while the 17th was battling for its life. The Confederate guns bombarded Cemetery and Culp's Hills. Some new Federal batteries on the right screened from Ewell's guns opened a sharp fire on the intruders in the works. Williams' and Geary's divisions of XII Corps charged and retook works. After the recapture, Federal artillery silenced Ewell's batteries.

The action on front line dropped off save the occasional spray of musketry or cannon shot. The 17th remained in the woods resting on their arms and trying to find food and water. At 9:00 a.m., commissary wagons arrived for Ward's 1st Division. (Note: With Sickles' wounded, Birney had moved up to command II Corps leaving Ward as the senior brigade commander to command the division. De Trobriand, despite being in the thick of the prior day's action was the only brigade commander still in command. Brig. Gen Graham, commander of the 1st Brigade (all Pennsylvania regiments) had been wounded and captured in the Peach Orchard and had been replaced by Col. Tippin of the 68th Pennsylvania. When Ward moved up to division command, Col. Berdan of the 1st United States Sharpshooters took command of the 2nd Brigade.) This was the first meal the 17th and the 3rd Brigade had eaten since midday Thursday.. After eating, the 17th was moved from the woods north up Taneytown road to woods on the reverse slope of Cemetery Ridge opposite the Granit Schoolhouse Road, behind the southern end of I and II Corps' line just behind the?.

It was a hot and humid day, and the men of the 17th waited in the woods with the 9th Michigan Horse Artillery. (Note: The 9th Michigan was a battery of Capt. Robertson's Horse Artillery brigade, one of several units pulled in from the Cavalry Corps to reinforce the battle line.) Many of the men took time to review the prior day's events or wrote letters home. Rumors abounded and the regiment erroneously heard that Sickles had died.

====== The afternoon ======
At 1:00 p.m., a fierce, heavy bombardment broke out without any warning all along the Rebels' line. Lee had massed 138 guns (Note: Estimates of the guns deployed vary. Coddington wrote "over 150"; Eicher, McPherson, and McPherson put it at 159; Trudeau says 164; Symonds cites "more than 160"; Clark writes "about 170"; Pfanz estimates "170 (we cannot know the exact number)"; and finally, de Trobriand in his memoirs says, "put in line in front of the Seminary Heights from a hundred and thirty to a hundred and forty pieces." All agree that approximately 80 guns available in the Army of Northern Virginia were not used during the bombardment.) in front of Seminary Ridge and hoped a powerful and well-concentrated barrage would destroying the AoP's artillery batteries and demoralize its infantry. But a combination of inept artillery leadership and defective equipment doomed the barrage from the beginning. Longstreet's corps artillery chief, Col. Alexander, had tactical command of the field while his boss, Brig. Gen. Pendleton, played little role other than to obstruct the effective placement of artillery from the other two corps. Despite Alexander's efforts, then, there was insufficient concentration of Confederate fire on the objective.

The July 3 bombardment was likely the largest of the war, (Note: Per Craig Symonds: "It may well have been the loudest man-made sound on the North American continent until the detonation of the first atomic bomb at Alamogordo, New Mexico.) with hundreds of cannons from both sides firing along the lines for one to two hours, (Note: Coddington indicates the bombardment stopped at 3 p.m., Hess writes that the bombardment was essentially over by 2 p.m. Wert states that accounts from participants of the bombardment duration vary from 45 minutes to two hours or more, but the "most reliable" are one hour, because the Confederates did not have sufficient ammunition to fire longer than that. Sears states the bombardment ended at 2:30 p.m.) starting in the south at the Peach Orchard and running roughly parallel to the Emmitsburg Road. Confederate Brig. Gen. Evander M. Law wrote, "The cannonade in the center ... presented one of the most magnificent battle-scenes witnessed during the war. Looking up the valley towards Gettysburg, the hills on either side were capped with crowns of flame and smoke, as 300 guns, about equally divided between the two ridges, vomited their iron hail upon each other."

The target of the Confederate artillery was the center of the AoP's line on Cemetery Ridge which had 80 guns in position. Lee, stymied by Longstreet's and Ewell's failures on the flanks, had decided to assault the center of the Federal Army's line, hoping his infantry would succeed like at Chancellorsville and break the line. The barrage was a "storm of death" as even the 17th with its brigade behind the ridge was struck by shells passing over the intended targets on the crest of the ridge. during this bombardment. Enemy shells overshooting the ridge crashed around de Trobriand's brigade for about two hours. Despite having his men lie down, de Trobriand still lost 76 men and 18 artillery horses, including 3 killed in the 17th.

Despite its ferocity, the fire was mostly ineffectual. Confederate shells often overshot the infantry front lines—in some cases because of inferior shell fuses that delayed detonation—and the smoke covering the battlefield concealed that fact from the gunners. Union artillery chief Brig. Gen. Henry J. Hunt had only about 80 guns available to conduct counter-battery fire; the geographic features of the Union line had limited areas for effective gun emplacement. Towards 3:00 p.m., Hunt ordered that firing cease to conserve ammunition, but also to fool Alexander, he ordered his cannons to cease fire slowly to create the illusion that they were being destroyed one by one. By the time all of Hunt's cannons ceased fire, and still blinded by the smoke from battle, Alexander fell for Hunt's deception and believed that many of the Union batteries had been destroyed. (Note: Lee's artillery had suffered from the counter battery fire and were also running out of ammunition.) Hunt had to resist the strong arguments of Hancock, who demanded Union fire to lift the spirits of the infantrymen pinned down by Alexander's bombardment. The counter-battery fire depleted the northern ammunition stocks, leaving them insufficient time to replenish before the southern assault. (Note: For the rest of his life, Hunt always maintained that had he been allowed to do save his long range shells for the impending infantry attack and bombarded the Rebels once they formed in the open for their advance with every gun available, the charge would never have happened and many northern lives would have been saved.)

Troops from Pickett's division of Longstreet's Corps came out from the woods and formed for the attack openly on the plain. At 3:00 p.m., Army Headquarters quickly moved the 17th and its brigade north on Cemetery Ridge, to the right of the Wheatfield Road and the previous day's contest. II Corps units were being slotted in to strengthen the front line. As the 17th moved out of the woods, it saw Pickett's men starting their advance. The attack, formed in seven lines, en masse, moved across an open field half a mile, under heavy fire from U.S. Army artillery. As they progressed, more U.S. artillery batteries were moving up onto the line on Cemetery Ridge.

The 17th and its brigade were placed in line to the left of Gibbon's 2nd Division in II Corps. When the Rebels were in easy reach of case shot, U.S. artillery opened fire mowing them down, but not stopping them. On the contrary, they came on the faster, only obliquing to the left, under ever increasing artillery fire. The 17th watched as columns marched with precision, their thinning ranks closing up without wavering as they neared U.S. forces. Fire from Lt. Col. Freeman McGilvery's artillery positions north of Little Round Top and screened from Lee and Alexander's view by the high ground where III Corps had been the day before, raked the Confederate right flank to great effect. Meanwhile, artillery fire from Cemetery Hill hit the left, while the center faced the II Corps' batteries with the Union artillery reserve in a second line behind. The ground between Seminary Ridge and Cemetery Ridge is slightly undulating, and the advancing troops periodically disappeared from the view of the Union cannoneers while advancing the nearly three quarters of a mile across open fields to reach the Union line. The 17th was in battle line beside the 9th Michigan battery. De Trobriand noted his men counting the gaps made in Rebel ranks and feeling that they were getting full revenge for Fredericksburg.

As the 17th stood ready to defend its patch, it saw Pickett's first line near to 150 yards of II Corps' line on its right when the musketry of two infantry divisions burst into a sheet of flame, and doubled the carnage. The Confederates charged forward. The men of the 17th recalled a momentary wavering when the lead elements reached the AoP's line.

The Rebels ranks mixed together and formed a confused column of men running, rolling, and tumbling forward, and through which the cannon opened great lanes. The 17th saw their fellow Yankees of Stannard's Vermont Brigade change front forward, and face right to fire on the right flank of attacking column assailants. The Maine men heard the Rebels give a yell of triumph, as they momentarily breached the battle line. Then, under the direction of Hancock, I and II Corps fell upon the enemy's column. Federal soldiers closed in head of the column, sealing the breach. Attacked in their turn on one side, turned on the other, almost surrounded, the remnant of Pickett's division at the wall threw down their arms and surrendered. The 17th watched as some Rebel survivors opted to retreat while still in range of canister rounds which again cut down half of them. Now, at their front, the 17th and the rest of the brigade saw Wilcox's brigade, which seemed to have been held in reserve on the right of Pickett's division, advancing. (Note: De Trobriand opined that Wilcox may have attacked in its turn, perhaps to protect the fugitives by a diversion.) Although armed and ready, the 17th had no need to engage the advance because the fire of the batteries nearby stopped it cold, and a last charge of two regiments of Stannard disintegrated it taking many prisoners.

====== Aftermath ======
The Mainers thought the prisoners sorry-looking as they watched them march to the rear as prisoners of war. Merrill and his men stayed in position and built up defenses. Merrill received orders to man pickets in front of the army's line. In front of their position, the regiment's skirmishers found the newly made grave of Brig. Gen. Barksdale. They took a dim view of his headboard noting his prior terms as a U. S. Congressman, seeing him as a traitor "... whose laws he had sworn to uphold, and, paying the penalty of treason is death at the hands of United States soldiers, buried in a blanket, with a pasteboard monument erected to his memory."

The regiment had not engaged with the Rebel infantry, but had suffered from the bombardment. The days actions cost the 17th 2 dead and 10 wounded.

== Affiliations, battle honors, detailed service, and casualties ==
=== Organizational affiliation ===
Attached to:

- Defences of Washington to October 1862
- 3rd Brigade, 1st Division, III Corps, Army of the Potomac, to March 1864
- 2nd Brigade, 3rd Division, II Corps, to June 1864.
- 1st Brigade, 3rd Division, II Corps, to March 1865. 2nd Brigade, 3rd Division, II Corps, to June 1865.

=== List of battles ===
The official list of battles in which the regiment bore a part:

- Battle of Fredericksburg
- Battle of Chancellorsville
- Battle of Gettysburg
- Battle of Wapping Heights
- Bristoe Campaign
- First Battle of Auburn
- Battle of Bristoe Station
- Mine Run Campaign
- Battle of Mine Run
- Battle of the Wilderness
- Battle of Spotsylvania
- Battle of Cold Harbor
- Siege of Petersburg
- Appomattox Campaign

=== Detailed service ===
==== 1862 ====
- Left State for Washington, D.C., August 21
- Attached to Defenses of Washington to October 7, 1862.
- At Upton's Hill, Va., until October 12
- Edwards Ferry October 12–28.
- Advance to Warrenton, thence to Falmouth, Va., October 28 – November 22
- Battle of Fredericksburg December 12–15
  - Eastern Bank of Rappahannock December 12–13
  - Fields southwest of Fredericksburg December 13–15
- To winter encampment, Falmouth, Va., December 16

==== 1863 ====
- Falmouth, VA
- "Mud March" January 20–24
- Back to encampment, Camp Sickles, Falmouth, January 25
- Chancellorsville Campaign April 27 – May 6
  - Battle of Chancellorsville May 1–5
- Return to Camp Sickles, May 6
- Gettysburg Campaign June 13 – July 24
  - To Manassas. June 11–16
  - Centerville, June 17–25
  - Edward's Ferry, June 26
  - To Middletown, Maryland, June 28
  - To Frederick, Maryland, June 28
  - To Taneytown, Maryland June 29
  - T0 Emmetsburg, June 30
  - To Gettysburg, July 1
  - Battle of Gettysburg July 2–3
  - Battle of Wapping Heights July 23
- To Sulphur Springs encampment, July 25
- To Brandy Station September 15
- Bristoe Campaign October 9–22
  - First Battle of Auburn, October 13
  - Second Battle of Auburn, October 14
  - Battle of Bristoe Station, October 14
- Advance to line of the Rappahannock November 7–8
- Kelly's Ford November 7
- Mine Run Campaign November 26 – December 2
  - Battle of Payne's Farm November 27
  - Battle of Mine Run November 28–30

==== 1864 ====
- Demonstration on the Rapidan February 6–7.
- Overland Campaign May 3 – June 15. — Broke camp under command Colonel West, 21 commissioned officers, 5 acting officers, and 439 enlisted men.
  - Battle of the Wilderness May 5–7. — Commanded by West/Walker/Moore. (Note: Col West seriously wounded by bullet in his right thigh May 6. Colonel Walker of 4th Maine relieved him to command both regiments. May 7, Birney appointed Major Moore of 99th Pennsylvania to command.) Attached to Hays' (Note: Killed in action May 5, near the junction of the Brock and Plank Roads in the Wilderness, being struck in the head by a Minié ball.)/Crocker's 2nd Brigade, Birney's 3rd Division, Hancock's II Corps, Meade's Army of Potomac. Set up entrenchments May 5 along Brock Road. May 6, drove enemy from Brock one mile, and retreated unmolested to Brock Road works. Repulsed several unsuccessful assaults by Longstreet's Corps. Heavy fighting along fortifications set brush on fire. Lost 24 men killed, 147 wounded and 12 missing.
  - Laurel Hill May 8.
  - Spotsylvania May 8–9
  - Skirmishing on Po River May 10. — Lost 10 wounded 2 missing.
  - Battle of Spotsylvania Court House May 11–21, — Attached to Crocker's (Note: Crocker wounded May 12.)/Egan's 2nd Brigade, Birney's 3rd Division, Hancock's II Corps, Meade's Army of Potomac.
    - Skirmishing between Po and Brock Road, May 11 — While erecting works, lost 2 wounded
    - "Bloody Angle," Assault on the Salient, May 12. — With Corps, stealthily pulled at night from Union right wing to pass behind and to woods at left end of the line. At daybreak from these woods assaulted, captured, and held breast works. Sergeant Frank Haskell and Private John F Totman captured defending Confederate division commander, Edward Johnson (general). Lost 3 killed, 41 wounded, and 10 missing.
    - Lieutenant Colonel Merrill returned from Maine, relieved Major Moore, and took command
    - Harris Farm, Fredericksburg Road, May 19.
  - Battle of North Anna May 23–26. — Attacked, took, and held rebel positions to south and west overlooking North Anna river. Lost 4 killed and 17 wounded.
  - Line of the Pamunkey May 26–28.
  - Totopotomoy May 28–31.
  - Battle of Cold Harbor June 1–12. — Attached to Egan's 1st Brigade, Birney's 3rd Division, Hancock's II Corps, Meade's Army of Potomac. Birney's Division anchored right wing of army. Lost 23 men.On June 4, gained 129 men transferred from 3rd Maine whose enlistment still remained. In works skirmishing until 21:00, May 12 when repeating Spotsylvania move, shifted behind center and left of Army of Potomac, quietly took positions in the moonlight at new left wing.
  - Wilcox Landing, June 14
  - Before Petersburg June 16–19.
- Siege of Petersburg June 16, 1864, to April 2, 1865. — Lost 84 men
  - Second Battle of Petersburg June 15–18 — Commanded by Captain John C. Perry (Note: June 15–16, 1864, wounded early morning of June 16)/Captain Benjamin C. Pennell (Note: June 16–17, killed June 17)/Major Erasmus C. Gilbreath (of the 20th IN). (Note: Took command June 18<) Attached to Egan's (Note: Egan wounded 16 June)/Madill's 1st Brigade, Birney's (Note: Birney promoted to II Corps commander, June 18)/Mott's 3rd Division, Birney's/Hancock's II Corps, Meade's Army of Potomac. Made two unsuccessful assaults on Confederate entrenchments on June 16. On June 17 occupied the same works which had been captured the night before. On June 18, advanced and took defenses from enemy again. Lost 10 Killed, 46 wounded, and 9 missing.
  - Battle of Jerusalem Plank Road June 22–23. — Commanded by Gilbreath. Attached to de Trobriand's 1st Brigade, Mott's 3rd Division, Hancock's II Corps, Meade's Army of Potomac. Occupied second line during June 22 and watched Mahone's attack stall at first line as well as 2nd brigade's unsuccessful attack to recapture first line. Attacked and retook front line morning June 23, which had been abandoned early morning by rebels.
  - Fatigue duty dismantling rebel fortifications, extending Union entrenchments, July 4–26
  - First Battle of Deep Bottom, north of the James, July 27–28. — Commanded by Gilbreath. Attached to de Trobriand's 1st Brigade, Mott's 3rd Division, Hancock's II Corps, Meade's Army of Potomac. Held in reserve for Mott's 3rd Division. Deployed as skirmishers to protect right flank to Bailey's Run.
  - Battle of the Crater July 30. — 'Commanded by Gilbreath. Attached to de Trobriand's 1st Brigade, Mott's 3rd Division, Hancock's II Corps, Meade's Army of Potomac. Held in trenches byu brigade commander when intel reported opposite works fully manned. Lieutenant Colonel Merrill takes command July 31.
  - Second Battle of Deep Bottom August 13–20. — Commanded by Merrill. Attached to de Trobriand's 1st Brigade, Mott's 3rd Division, Hancock's II Corps, Meade's Army of Potomac. Embarked on steamers to make show of sailing away, but returned under nightfall to Deep Bottom.
    - Strawberry Plains August 14–18. — Enemy taken by surprise and driven from positions. Captured coastal defense batteries. Kept up constant harassing fore from skirmishers to pin down rebel forces.
  - Second Battle of Ream's Station August 25. — Brigade under arms as Corps reserve
  - In entrenchments to the right of Fort Sedgewick, August 29 – September 28
  - Poplar Springs Church September 29 – October 2.
  - Colonel West returns and takes command October 12.
  - Battle of Boydton Plank Road October 27–28. — Commanded by West/Captain William Hobson. Attached to de Trobriand's 1st Brigade, Mott's 3rd Division, Hancock's II Corps, Meade's Army of Potomac. Repulsed breakthrough on Egan's division October 27. Colonel West wounded again. Entrenched and held off Hampton's division on October 28.
  - Garrison at Fort Rice October 30 – November 29
  - To left flank at James River, November 30 – December 6
  - Raid on Weldon Railroad December 7–11. — Commanded by Hobson. Attached to de Trobriand's 1st Brigade, Mott's 3rd Division, Warren's V Corps, Meade's Army of Potomac (Raiding force consisted of V Corps plus Mott's Division, 3rd Division II Corps and Division of Cavalry). Marched 40 miles south to Jarratt to cut rail link between Petersburg and Wilmington From Nottaway River to Bellfield. On return to siege lines found stragglers and sick members of raiding party who had fallen behind murdered by local civilians along route. Burned houses in retaliation.
  - Winter encampment in the lines before Petersburg until February 4, 1865

==== 1865 ====
- William Hobson promoted to Lieutenant Colonel January 18. Retained command 17th Maine.
- Battle of Hatcher's Run February 5–7 — Commanded by Lieutenant Colonel William Hobson< (Note: Hobson wounded April 6). Attached to Pierce's 2nd Brigade, Mott's (Note: Mott wounded April 6)/de Trobriand's 3rd Division, Humphreys' II Corps, Meade's Army of Potomac. Advanced and captured enemy entrenchments at Hatcher's run on left wing of Union lines and turned enemy flank February 5. Captured 100 prisoners. Pulled reserve February 6. Sent to left flank again February 7.
- In entrenchments until March 25
- Appomattox Campaign March 28 – April 9.
  - South Side Railroad March 29.
  - Boydton Road and White Oak Ridge March 30–31.
  - Fall of Petersburg April 2.
  - Jettersville April 5. — Captured colors of 21st North Carolina and 150 prisoners.
  - Dentonville April 6. — Division charged over two miles and captured part of rebel wagon train. Hobson wounded. Captain Green took command. Over 300 prisoners taken. Lost 5 killed, 27 wounded. Noted that one in five officers were wounded and one in ten enlisted wounded during the day.
  - High Bridge April 6–7. — Major Charles P Mattocks takes command evening April 6
  - New Store April 8.
  - Appomattox Court House April 9. — Surrender of Lee and his army.
- At Burkesville April 11 – May 1.
- March to Washington, D. C., May 1–15.
- Grand Review May 23.
- Mustered out at Bailey's Cross Roads June 4, 1865.
- Recruits transferred to 1st Maine Heavy Artillery.
- Discharged at Portland, Me., June 10, 1865.

=== Casualties and total strength ===
The 17th Maine enrolled 1,371 men during its existence. It lost 12 officers and 116 enlisted men killed in action or died of wounds received in battle and an additional 4 officers and 159 enlisted men died of disease. 31 men died in Confederate prisons. Total fatalities for the regiment were 370.

== Armament ==
The 17th Maine was an 1862, Army of the Potomac, three-year regiment, that greatly increased the number of men under arms in the federal army. As with many of these volunteers, initially, there were not enough Model 1861 Springfield Rifles to go around so they were instead issued imported British Pattern 1853 rifles. (Note: While Maine's agents imported Enfields from Great Britain, it also purchased 1853 Enfields that had been manufactured by contract in 1855–1856 in Windsor, Vermont by the Robbins and Lawrence Armory (R&L). The company had sold gun making machinery (150 in all), to upgrade the new Enfield Armory in England prior to the Crimean War. The British also awarded a later contract during the Crimean War for 25,000 Enfield P1853 and P1856 rifles. The contract's stiff penalty clause for missing the production schedule caused R&L to go bankrupt in 1859. Eli Whitney bought some of the stock during the bankruptcy liquidation as well as leftover Enfield parts. Lamon, Goodnow and Yale (LG&Y) bought the factory to make sewing machines, but the onset of the war led them to continue producing the P1853, (as well as P1856 and licensed Sharps 1859s) for the duration of the war. The surrounding New England states and New York were eager customers for both Whitney and LG&Y.) These were the standard rifle for the British army having performed well in the Crimean War. The Enfield was a .577 calibre Minié-type muzzle-loading rifled musket. It was used by both armies and was the second most widely used infantry weapon in the Union forces.

=== Regimental ordance surveys ===
The regiment reported the following surveys for the Fredericksburg and Chancellorsville campaigns:

Fredericksburg

- A — 64 British Pattern 1853 rifles, (.58 and .577 Cal)
- B — Number unreported, British Pattern 1853 rifles, (.58 and .577 Cal)
- C — 66 British Pattern 1853 rifles, (.58 and .577 Cal)
- D — 68 British Pattern 1853 rifles, (.58 and .577 Cal)
- E — 63 British Pattern 1853 rifles, (.58 and .577 Cal)
- F — 60 British Pattern 1853 rifles, (.58 and .577 Cal)
- G — 63 British Pattern 1853 rifles, (.58 and .577 Cal)
- H — 68 British Pattern 1853 rifles, (.58 and .577 Cal)
- I — 61 British Pattern 1853 rifles, (.58 and .577 Cal)
- K — 59 British Pattern 1853 rifles, (.58 and .577 Cal)

Chancellorsville

- A — 60 British Pattern 1853 rifles, (.58 and .577 Cal)
- B — 53 British Pattern 1853 rifles, (.58 and .577 Cal)
- C — 45 British Pattern 1853 rifles, (.58 and .577 Cal)
- D — 59 British Pattern 1853 rifles, (.58 and .577 Cal)
- E — 53 British Pattern 1853 rifles, (.58 and .577 Cal)
- F — 51 British Pattern 1853 rifles, (.58 and .577 Cal)
- G — 58 British Pattern 1853 rifles, (.58 and .577 Cal)
- H — Number unreported, British Pattern 1853 rifles, (.58 and .577 Cal)
- I — 51 British Pattern 1853 rifles, (.58 and .577 Cal)
- K — 47 British Pattern 1853 rifles, (.58 and .577 Cal)

At Gettysburg, on the evening of July 3, General Birney wanted to standardize the weapons in his division. That evening, he had the 17th and other Enfield-equipped units in his command exchange their arms for the standard muzzle-loading rifled musket of the Union Army, the Springfield Model 1861 Rifled Musket (Note: These Springfields were either National Armory (NA) or contact manufactured. In government records, National Armory refers to one of three United States Armory and Arsenals, the Springfield Armory, the Harpers Ferry Armory, and the Rock Island Arsenal. Rifle-muskets, muskets, and rifles were manufactured in Springfield and Harper's Ferry before the war. When the Rebels destroyed the Harpers Ferry Armory early in the American Civil War and stole the machinery for the Confederate central government-run Richmond Armory, the Springfield Armory was briefly the only government manufacturer of arms, until the Rock Island Arsenal was established in 1862. During this time production ramped up to unprecedented levels ever seen in American manufacturing up until that time, with only 9,601 rifles manufactured in 1860, rising to a peak of 276,200 by 1864. Any arms manufacturer awarded a contract had to follow strict guidelines to ensure interoperability between parts for both NA and commercially produced Springfields. awarded These advancements would not only give the Union a decisive technological advantage over the Confederacy during the war but served as a precursor to the mass production manufacturing that contributed to the post-war Second Industrial Revolution and 20th century machine manufacturing capabilities. American historian Merritt Roe Smith has drawn comparisons between the early assembly machining of the Springfield rifles and the later production of the Ford Model T, with the latter having considerably more parts, but producing a similar numbers of units in the earliest years of the 1913–1915 automobile assembly line, indirectly due to mass production manufacturing advancements pioneered by the armory 50 years earlier.). It fired a .58 inch Minie Ball. and came with a square socket bayonet. They would carry their Springfields until their end of service. They reported the following in survey:

Survey for Fourth Quarter, 31 December 1863

- A — 38 Springfield Rifled Muskets, model 1855, 1861, NA and contract, (.58 Cal.)
- B — 38 Springfield Rifled Muskets, model 1855, 1861, NA and contract, (.58 Cal.); 1 P53 Enfield Rifled Muskets (.58 and .577 Cal.)
- C — 44 Springfield Rifled Muskets, model 1855, 1861, NA and contract, (.58 Cal.); 9 P53 Enfield Rifled Muskets (.58 and .577 Cal.)
- D — 50 Springfield Rifled Muskets, model 1855, 1861, NA and contract, (.58 Cal.)
- E — Number unreported, Springfield Rifled Muskets, model 1855, 1861, NA and contract, (.58 Cal.); 3 P53 Enfield Rifled Muskets (.58 and .577 Cal.)
- F — 38 Springfield Rifled Muskets, model 1855, 1861, NA and contract, (.58 Cal.)
- G — 43 Springfield Rifled Muskets, model 1855, 1861, NA and contract, (.58 Cal.)
- H — 39 Springfield Rifled Muskets, model 1855, 1861, NA and contract, (.58 Cal.)
- I — 35 Springfield Rifled Muskets, model 1855, 1861, NA and contract, (.58 Cal.); 1 P53 Enfield Rifled Muskets (.58 and .577 Cal.)
- K — 47 Springfield Rifled Muskets, model 1855, 1861, NA and contract, (.58 Cal.); 2 P53 Enfield Rifled Muskets (.58 and .577 Cal.)

Survey for Fourth Quarter, 31 December 1864

- A — 21 Springfield Rifled Muskets, model 1855, 1861, NA and contract, (.58 Cal.)
- B — 33 Springfield Rifled Muskets, model 1855, 1861, NA and contract, (.58 Cal.
- C — 26 Springfield Rifled Muskets, model 1855, 1861, NA and contract, (.58 Cal.)
- D — 31 Springfield Rifled Muskets, model 1855, 1861, NA and contract, (.58 Cal.)
- E — 24 Springfield Rifled Muskets, model 1855, 1861, NA and contract, (.58 Cal.)
- F — 27 Springfield Rifled Muskets, model 1855, 1861, NA and contract, (.58 Cal.)
- G — 15 Springfield Rifled Muskets, model 1855, 1861, NA and contract, (.58 Cal.)); 1 P53 Enfield Rifled Muskets (.58 and .577 Cal.)
- H — 21 Springfield Rifled Muskets, model 1855, 1861, NA and contract, (.58 Cal.)
- I — 26 Springfield Rifled Muskets, model 1855, 1861, NA and contract, (.58 Cal.)
- K — 23 Springfield Rifled Muskets, model 1855, 1861, NA and contract, (.58 Cal.)

=== Shoulder Arms Gallery ===
Issued weapons

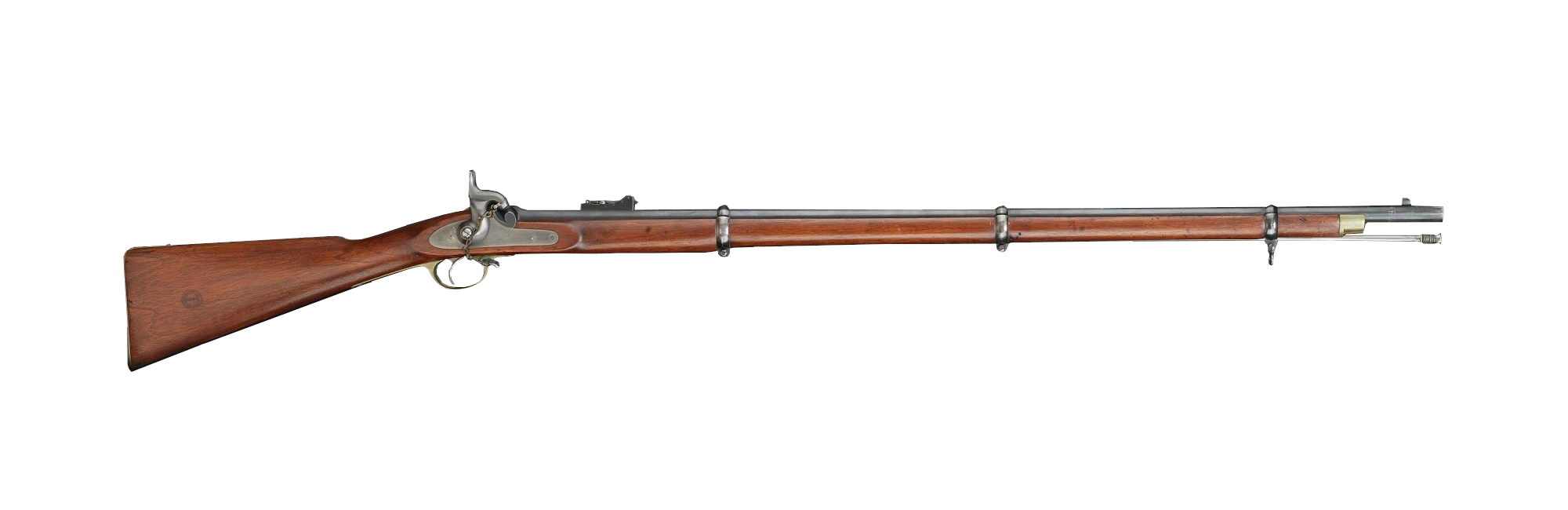
1853 Enfield rifle-musket

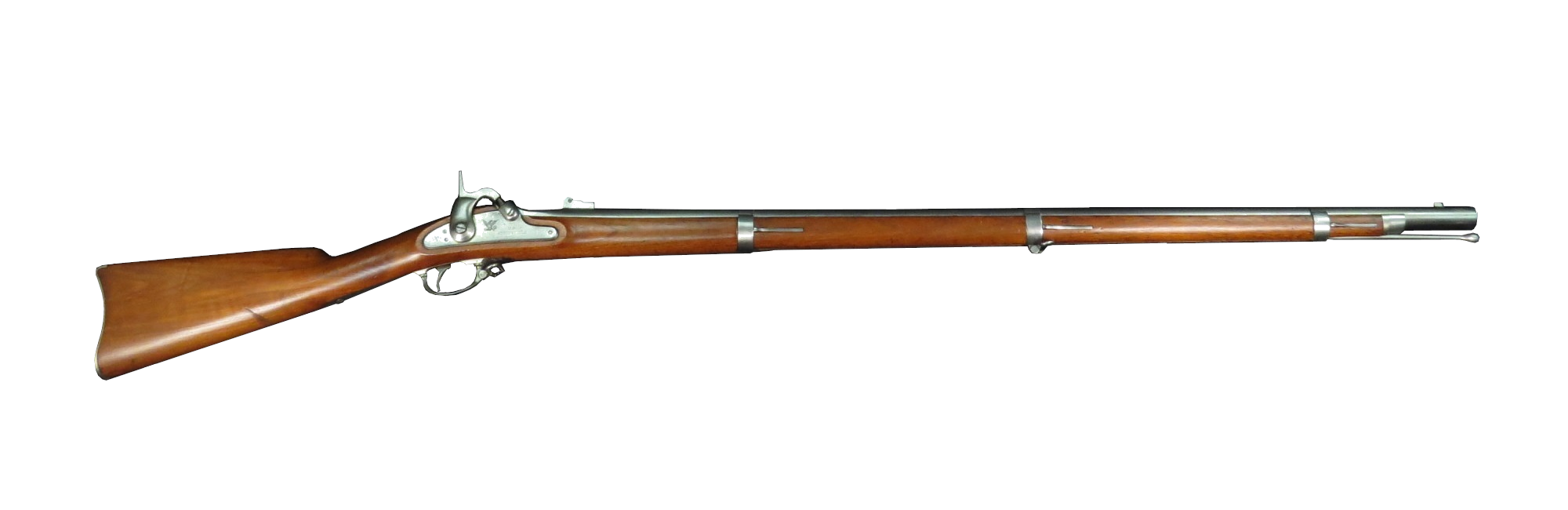
Springfield Model 1861

== Memorials ==
The 17th Maine has two memorials at Gettysburg. The larger is at its position at the stone wall at the edge of the Wheatfield on July 2. The smaller one is on Cemetery Ridge marking the regiment's position on July 3.

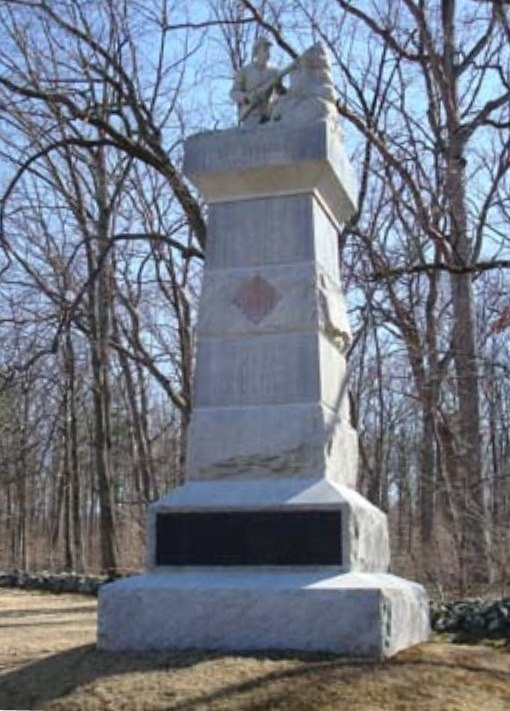
17th Maine monument at the Wheatfield at Gettysburg

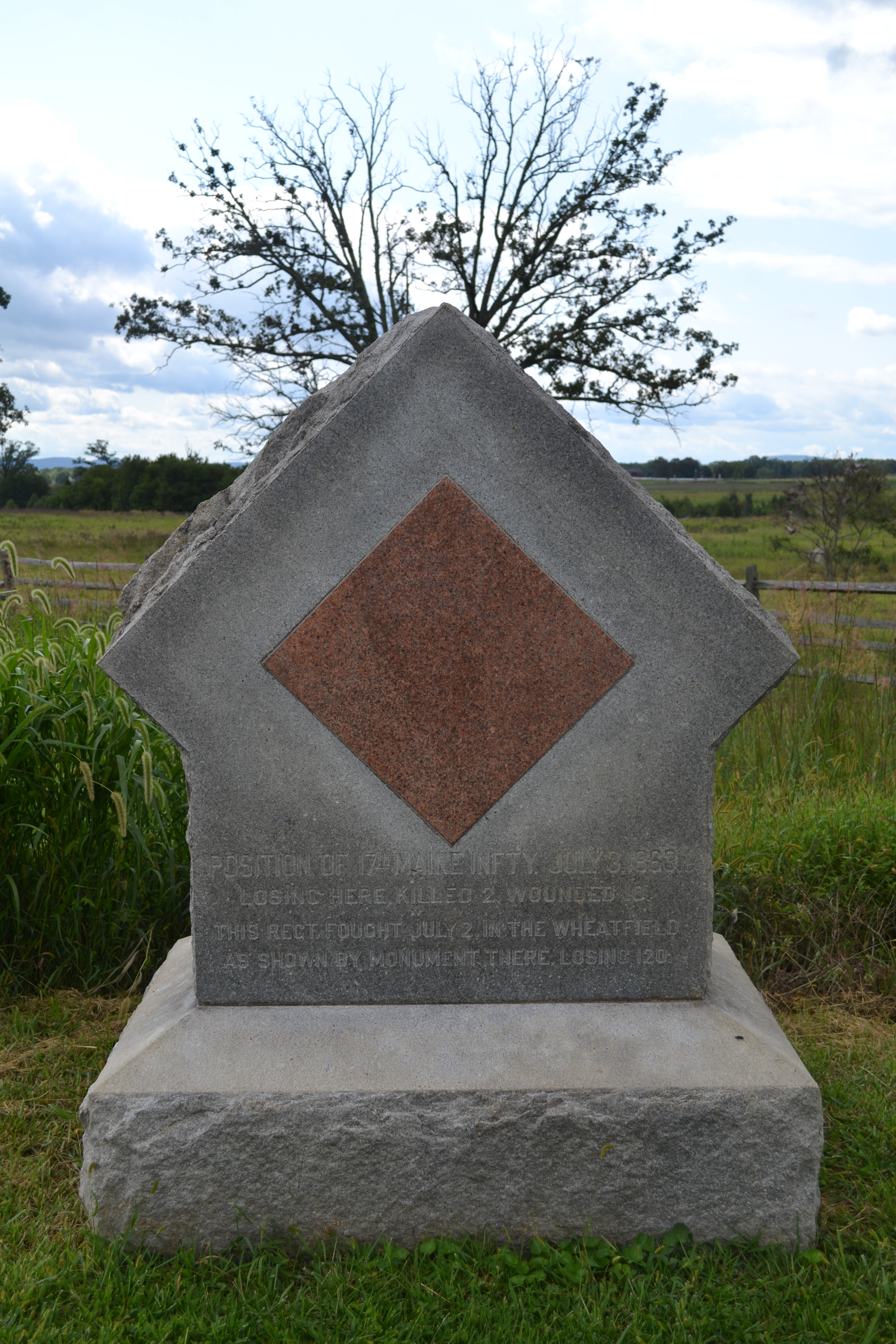
17th Maine Infantry July 3, position marker at Gettysburg National Military Park

== See also ==
- List of Maine Civil War units
- Maine in the American Civil War
