= Battery I, 1st Michigan Light Artillery Regiment =

- Active: 29 August 1862 – 14 July 1865
- Country: United States
- Allegiance: Union
- Branch: Artillery
- Engagements: Battle of Gettysburg; Battle of Resaca; Battle of New Hope Church; Battle of Kennesaw Mountain; Battle of Peachtree Creek

Battery I, 1st Michigan Light Artillery Regiment was an artillery battery from Michigan that served in the Union Army during the American Civil War.

== History ==
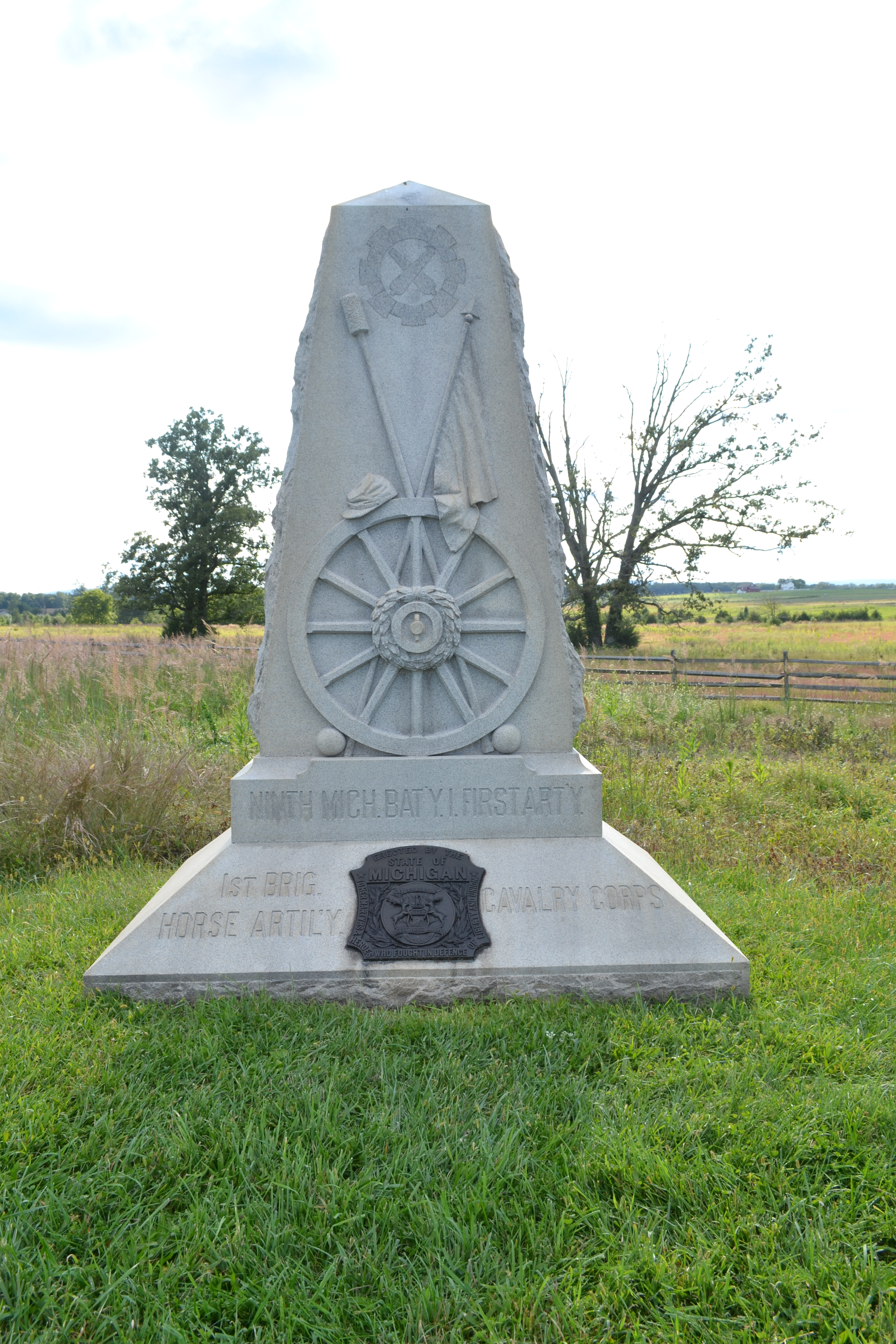
9th Michigan Battery Monument at Gettysburg

The battery was organized at Detroit, Michigan as the 9th Michigan Battery in response to Lincoln's July 1862 call for 300,000 three-year volunteers and mustered into service on 29 August with 168 officers and men, mostly from Lenawee County. Jabez J. Daniels of Hudson was appointed captain. The other officers were First Lieutenants Addison Kidder of Hudson and Luther R. Smith of Detroit and Second Lieutenants Lewis R. Gage of Detroit and Thomas J. Limbocker of Trenton. It was raised together with and initially attached to the 5th Michigan Cavalry Regiment. The battery departed Detroit for Washington, D.C., on 4 December with the 5th Michigan Cavalry, equipped with four Parrott rifles and two howitzers. Arriving at its destination on 11 December, the battery joined the Army of the Potomac.

The battery saw its first action in the Battle of Aldie on 27 April 1863, suffering no casualties. It returned to Fairfax Court House three days later and when the Gettysburg campaign began marched from Fairfax Court House to Drainsville on 24 June. Continuing via Frederick and Taneytown, Maryland, the battery arrived at Gettysburg on 2 July. It fought in the Battle of Gettysburg on 3 July with the loss of one man killed and four wounded. Another was wounded two days later, before the battery marched from the battlefield on 8 July for Berlin, Maryland via Creagerstown and Boonsboro. From Berlin the battery moved to Warrenton Junction via Uniontown, Virginia and Piedmont. After its arrival at Warrenton on 25 July, the battery moved forward to rejoin the army at Culpeper Court House.

The battery was ordered to Nashville, Tennessee on 27 October to join the Army of the Cumberland, arriving at its destination on 12 November. Daniels resigned in December and Smith succeeded him as captain on 15 December; Smith commanded the battery for the rest of its existence. The battery remained at Nashville with the army reserve artillery until 7 March 1864, when it began a march to Whiteside, Tennessee to join the army for the Atlanta campaign. The 140-mile (230 km) march took ten days, and the battery remained at Whiteside until 28 April, when it joined General Daniel Butterfield's Third Division of XX Corps at Lookout Valley for the advance towards Atlanta. The advance steadily proceeded until the 19 May Battle of Cassville, in which Battery I was engaged without loss. At Cassville, the Parrotts of the battery were emplaced in the sector of the Third Division on two knolls, potentially enfilading the Confederate line on the ridge east of Cassville. Late that day, the battery contributed to the Union bombardment against the ridge, which forced a Confederate retreat without a fight.

The battery later fought in the Battle of New Hope Church on 27–28 May, the Battle of Lost Mountain on 17 June, the Battle of Culp's House on 1 July, the Battle of Marietta on 3 July, and the Battle of Peachtree Creek on 20 July. The battery participated in the Siege of Atlanta from 22 July to 25 August and the Battle of Turner's Ferry on 29 August, before returning to Chattanooga, Tennessee in November. Battery I remained there until July 1865, when it departed for Detroit, where it was mustered out on 14 July 1865. Of the 213 men carried on its rolls, the battery lost two killed in action, two mortally wounded, and 14 died of disease. 23 were invalided out of service.

== Commanders ==
- Captain Jabez J. Daniels
- Captain Luther R. Smith

== See also ==
- List of Michigan Civil War Units
