= Uniontown, Virginia =

Unincorporated community in Virginia, United States

- Unincorporated community
- Location within Northern Virginia Location within Virginia Location within the United States
- Coordinates: 38°49′15″N 77°27′06″W
- Country: United States
- State: Virginia
- County: Fairfax
- Time zone: UTC−5 (Eastern (EST))
  - Summer (DST): UTC−4 (EDT)
- Area codes: 571 & 703
- GNIS feature ID: 1496344

Uniontown is an unincorporated community in Fairfax County, in the U.S. state of Virginia.
