= Battle of Fredericksburg order of battle: Confederate =

The following Confederate States Army units and commanders fought in the Battle of Fredericksburg of the American Civil War. Order of battle compiled from the army organization during the campaign. The Union order of battle is listed separately.

== Abbreviations used ==
=== Military rank ===
- Gen = General
- LTG = Lieutenant General
- MG = Major General
- BG = Brigadier General
- Col = Colonel
- Ltc = Lieutenant Colonel
- Maj = Major
- Cpt = Captain
- Lt = Lieutenant
- Sgt = Sergeant

=== Other ===
- w = wounded
- mw = mortally wounded
- k =killed
- c = captured

== Army of Northern Virginia ==
Gen Robert E. Lee, Commanding

=== First Corps ===
LTG James Longstreet

Division	Brigade	Regiments and Others
McLaws' Division MG Lafayette McLaws	Kershaw's Brigade BG Joseph B. Kershaw	2nd South Carolina: Col John D. Kennedy; 3rd South Carolina: Col James D. Nance (w), Ltc William D. Rutherford (w), Maj Robert C. Maffett (w), Cpt William W. Hance (w), Cpt John C. Sumner (k), Cpt John K. G. Nance; 7th South Carolina: Ltc Elbert Bland (w); 8th South Carolina: Cpt Eli T. Stackhouse; 15th South Carolina: Col William D. DeSaussure; 3rd South Carolina Battalion: Ltc William G. Rice
McLaws' Division MG Lafayette McLaws	Barksdale's Brigade BG William Barksdale	13th Mississippi: Col John W. Carter; 17th Mississippi: Col John C. Fiser; 18th Mississippi: Ltc William H. Luse; 21st Mississippi: Col Benjamin G. Humphreys
McLaws' Division MG Lafayette McLaws	Cobb's Brigade BG Thomas R.R. Cobb (mw); Col Robert E. McMillan	16th Georgia: Col Goode Bryan; 18th Georgia: Ltc Solon Z. Ruff; 24th Georgia: Col Robert E. McMillan, Ltc Jefferson M. Lamar; Cobb's (Georgia) Legion: Ltc Luther Glenn; Phillip's (Georgia) Legion: Ltc Robert T. Cook (k), Maj Joseph Hamilton
McLaws' Division MG Lafayette McLaws	Semmes' Brigade BG Paul J. Semmes	10th Georgia: Col John B. Weems; 50th Georgia: Col William R. Manning; 51st Georgia: Col William M. Slaughter; 53rd Georgia: Col James P. Simms
McLaws' Division MG Lafayette McLaws	Artillery Col Henry C. Cabell	Manly's (North Carolina) battery Cpt Basil C. Manly; Read's (Georgia) battery: Cpt John P.W. Read; McCarthy's battery, 1st Richmond Howitzers: Cpt Edward S. McCarthy; Carlton's Battery, Troup (Georgia) Artillery: Cpt Henry H. Carlton
Anderson's Division MG Richard H. Anderson	Wilcox's Brigade BG Cadmus M. Wilcox	8th Alabama: Col Young L. Royston; 9th Alabama: Col Samuel Henry; 10th Alabama: Col William H. Forney; 11th Alabama: Col John C. C. Sanders; 14th Alabama: Col Lucius Pinkard
Anderson's Division MG Richard H. Anderson	Mahone's Brigade BG William Mahone	6th Virginia: Col Thomas J. Cornprew; 12th Virginia: Cpt John R. Lewellen; 16th Virginia: Maj Francis D. Holliday; 41st Virginia: Col William A. Parham; 61st Virginia: Ltc William F. Niemeyer
Anderson's Division MG Richard H. Anderson	Featherston's Brigade BG Winfield S. Featherston	12th Mississippi: Col William H. Taylor; 16th Mississippi: Col Carnot Posey; 19th Mississippi: Col Thomas Hardin (k); 48th Mississippi (5 companies): Ltc Thomas B. Manlove
Anderson's Division MG Richard H. Anderson	Wright's Brigade BG Ambrose R. Wright	3rd Georgia: Col Edward J. Walker; 22nd Georgia: Col Robert H. Jones; 48th Georgia: Cpt Matthew R. Hall; 2nd Georgia Battalion: Cpt Charles J. Moffett
Anderson's Division MG Richard H. Anderson	Perry's Brigade BG Edward A. Perry	2nd Florida: Ltc Lewis G. Pyles; 5th Florida Col John C. Hately; 8th Florida: Col David Lang (w, Dec. 13), Cpt Thomas R. Love
Anderson's Division MG Richard H. Anderson	Artillery Ltc John S. Saunders	Donaldsonville Louisiana Artillery: Cpt Victor Maurin; Huger's (Virginia) battery: Cpt Frank Huger; Lewis' (Virginia) battery: Cpt John W. Lewis; Norfolk (Virginia) Light Artillery Blues: Lt William T. Peet
Pickett's Division MG George Pickett	Garnett's Brigade BG Richard B. Garnett	8th Virginia: Col Eppa Hunton; 18th Virginia: Col Robert E. Withers; 19th Virginia: Col Henry Gantt; 28th Virginia: Col Robert C. Allen; 56th Virginia: Col William D. Stuart
Pickett's Division MG George Pickett	Armistead's Brigade BG Lewis A. Armistead	9th Virginia: Ltc James S. Gilliam; 14th Virginia: Col James G. Hodges; 38th Virginia: Col Edward C. Edmonds; 53rd Virginia: Col William R. Aylett; 57th Virginia: Col David Dyer
Pickett's Division MG George Pickett	Kemper's Brigade BG James L. Kemper	1st Virginia: Col Lewis B. Williams, Jr.; 3rd Virginia: Col Joseph Mayo, Jr.; 7th Virginia: Col Waller T. Patton; 11th Virginia: Maj Kirkwood Otey; 24th Virginia: Col William R. Terry
Pickett's Division MG George Pickett	Jenkins' Brigade BG Micah Jenkins	1st South Carolina (Hagood's): Col Daniel H. Hamilton; 2nd South Carolina (Rifles): Col Robert E. Bowen; 5th South Carolina: Col Ashbury Coward; 6th South Carolina: Col John M. Steedman; Hampton's Legion (Infantry Battalion): Ltc Robert B. Arnold; Palmetto Sharpshooters: Col Joseph Walker
Pickett's Division MG George Pickett	Corse' s Brigade BG Montgomery D. Corse	15th Virginia: Cpt Emmett M. Morrison; 17th Virginia: Maj Arthur Hebert; 30th Virginia: Col Alfred T. Harrison; 32nd Virginia: Col Edgar B. Montague
Pickett's Division MG George Pickett	Artillery Maj James Dearing	Dearing's (Virginia) battery: Cpt Joseph Blount; Fauquier (Virginia) Artillery: Cpt Robert M. Stribling; Richmond Fayette (Virginia) Artillery: Cpt Miles C. Macon
Hood's Division MG John B. Hood	Law's Brigade BG Evander M. Law	4th Alabama: Col Pinckney D. Bowles; 44th Alabama: Ltc Charles A. Derby; 6th North Carolina: Ltc Robert F. Webb; 54th North Carolina: Col James C. S. McDowell; 57th North Carolina: Col Archibald C. Godwin
Hood's Division MG John B. Hood	Robertson' s Brigade BG Jerome B. Robertson	3rd Arkansas: Col Van H. Manning; 1st Texas: Col Philip A. Work; 4th Texas: Col John C.G. Key; 5th Texas: Col Robert M. Powell
Hood's Division MG John B. Hood	Anderson's Brigade BG George T. Anderson	1st Georgia Regulars: Cpt Richard A. Wayne; 7th Georgia: Ltc George H. Carmichael; 8th Georgia: Col John R. Towers; 9th Georgia: Ltc John C. Mounger; 11th Georgia: Col Francis H. Little
Hood's Division MG John B. Hood	Toombs' Brigade Col Henry L. Benning	2nd Georgia: Ltc William R. Holmes; 15th Georgia: Col William T. Millican; 17th Georgia: Col Wesley C. Hodges; 20th Georgia: Col John R. Cummings
Hood's Division MG John B. Hood	Artillery Maj Mathias W. Henry	Bachman's battery, German (South Carolina) Artillery: Cpt William K. Bachman; Garden's battery, Palmetto (South Carolina) Light Artillery: Cpt Hugh R. Garden; Reilly's battery, Rowan (North Carolina) Artillery: Cpt James Reilly
Ransom's Division BG Robert Ransom, Jr.	Ransom's Brigade BG Robert Ransom, Jr.	24th North Carolina: Ltc John L. Harris; 25th North Carolina: Ltc Samuel C. Bryson; 35th North Carolina: Col Matt W. Ransom; 49th North Carolina: Ltc Lee McAfee; Branch's (Virginia) battery: Cpt James R. Branch
Ransom's Division BG Robert Ransom, Jr.	Cooke's Brigade BG John R. Cooke (w, Dec. 13); Col Edward D. Hall	15th North Carolina: Ltc William MacRae; 27th North Carolina: Col John A. Gilmer, Jr.; 46th North Carolina: Col Edward D. Hall; 48th North Carolina: Ltc Samuel H. Walkup; Cooper's Stafford (Virginia) battery: Cpt Raleigh L. Cooper
First Corps Artillery	Washington (Louisiana) Artillery Col James B. Walton	1st Company: Cpt Charles W. Squires; 2nd Company: Cpt John B. Richardson; 3rd Company: Cpt Merritt B. Miller; 4th Company: Cpt Benjamin F. Eshleman
First Corps Artillery	Alexander's Battalion Ltc E. Porter Alexander	Bedford (Virginia) Artillery: Cpt Tyler C. Jordan; Bath (Virginia) battery: Cpt John L. Eubank; Madison Louisiana Light Artillery: Cpt George V. Moody; Parker's (Virginia) battery: Cpt William W. Parker; Brook's (South Carolina) battery(Rhett): Cpt Andrew B. Rhett; Ashland (Virginia) battery: Cpt Pichegru Woolfolk, Jr.

=== Second Corps ===
LTG Thomas J. Jackson

Division	Brigade	Regiments and Others
D.H. Hill's Division MG D.H. Hill	First (Rodes') Brigade BG Robert E. Rodes	3rd Alabama: Cullen A. Battle (w, Dec. 13); 5th Alabama: Col Cadwallader Jones; 6th Alabama: Col John B. Gordon; 12th Alabama: Ltc Samuel B Pickens; 26th Alabama: Col Edward A. O'Neal
D.H. Hill's Division MG D.H. Hill	Second (Doles') Brigade BG George Doles	4th Georgia: Col Philip Cook; 44th Georgia: Col John B. Estes; 1st North Carolina: Col Hamilton A. Brown; 3rd North Carolina: Col William L. DeRosset
D.H. Hill's Division MG D.H. Hill	Third (Colquitt's) Brigade BG Alfred H. Colquitt	13th Alabama: Col Birkett D. Fry; 6th Georgia: Col John T. Lofton; 23rd Georgia: Col Emory F. Best; 27th Georgia: Col Charles T. Zachary; 28th Georgia: Maj Tully Graybill
D.H. Hill's Division MG D.H. Hill	Fourth (Iverson's) Brigade BG Alfred Iverson Jr.	5th North Carolina: Cpt Thomas W. Garrett; 12th North Carolina: Col Henry E. Coleman; 20th North Carolina: Ltc Frank Faison; 23rd North Carolina: Col Daniel H. Christie
D.H. Hill's Division MG D.H. Hill	Fifth (Ramseur's) Brigade Col Bryan Grimes	2nd North Carolina: Col William P. Byrum; 4th North Carolina: Col Edwin A. Y. Osborne; 14th North Carolina: Col Risden T. Bennett; 30th North Carolina: Col Francis M. Parker
D.H. Hill's Division MG D.H. Hill	Artillery Maj Hilary P. Jones; Maj Thomas H. Carter	Hardaway's (Alabama) battery: Cpt Robert A. Hardaway, Cpt William B. Hurt; Bondurant's battery, Jeff Davis (Alabama) Artillery: Cpt James W. Bondurant; Carter's battery, King William (Virginia) Artillery: Cpt Thomas H. Carter, Cpt William P. P. Carter; Page's battery, Morris (Virginia) Artillery: Cpt Richard C. M. Page; Fry's battery, Orange (Virginia) Artillery: Cpt Charles M. Fry; Goochland (Virginia) Artillery: Cpt William H. Turner
A. P. Hill's Light Division MG A. P. Hill	First (Field's) Brigade Col John M. Brockenbrough	40th Virginia: Cpt Timothy E. Betts; 47th Virginia: Col Robert M. Mayo; 55th Virginia: Col Francis Mallroy; 22nd Virginia Battalion: Ltc Edward P. Tayloe
A. P. Hill's Light Division MG A. P. Hill	Second (Gregg's) Brigade BG Maxcy Gregg (mw, Dec. 13); Col Samuel McGowan	1st South Carolina (Provisional Army): Col Daniel H. Hamilton; 1st South Carolina Rifles: Col James L. Orr; 12th South Carolina: Col Richard G. Mills Dunovant; 13th South Carolina: Col Oliver E. Edwards; 14th South Carolina: Col Samuel McGowan, Ltc William D. Simpson
A. P. Hill's Light Division MG A. P. Hill	Third (Thomas') Brigade BG Edward L. Thomas	14th Georgia: Col Arnoldus V. Brumby; 35th Georgia: Col Bolling H. Holt; 45th Georgia: Col Thomas J. Simmons; 49th Georgia: Col Andrew J. Lane
A. P. Hill's Light Division MG A. P. Hill	Fourth (Lane's) Brigade BG James H. Lane	7th North Carolina: Ltc Junius L. Hill; 18th North Carolina: Col Thomas J. Purdie; 28th North Carolina: Col Samuel D. Lowe; 33rd North Carolina: Col Clark M. Avery; 37th North Carolina: Cpt William M. Barbour
A. P. Hill's Light Division MG A. P. Hill	Fifth (Archer's) Brigade BG James J. Archer	5th Alabama Battalion: Maj Albert S. Van de Graaff (w), Cpt Samuel D. Stewart; 19th Georgia: Ltc Andrew J. Hutchins; 1st Tennessee (Provisional Army): Col Peter Turney (w), Ltc Newton J. George (w), Cpt Miller Turney (w), Cpt Henry J. Hawkins; 7th Tennessee: Col John F. Goodner; 14th Tennessee: Ltc James W. Lockert
A. P. Hill's Light Division MG A. P. Hill	Sixth (Pender's) Brigade BG William D. Pender (w, Dec. 13); Col Alfred M. Scales	13th North Carolina: Col Alfred M. Scales; 16th North Carolina: Col John S. McElroy; 22nd North Carolina: Maj Christopher C. Cole; 34th North Carolina: Col William L. J. Lowrance; 38th North Carolina: Col William H. H. Cowles
A. P. Hill's Light Division MG A. P. Hill	Artillery Ltc R. Lindsay Walker	Branch (North Carolina) Artillery: Lt John R. Potts; Crenshaw (Virginia) battery: Lt James Ellett; Fredericksburg (Virginia) Artillery: Lt Edward A. Marye; Johnson's (Virginia) battery: Lt Valentine J. Clutter; Letcher (Virginia) Artillery: Cpt Greenlee Davidson; Pee Dee (South Carolina) Artillery: Cpt David G. Mcintosh; Purcell (Virginia) Artillery: Cpt William Pegram
Ewell's Division BG Jubal A. Early	Lawton's Brigade Col Edmund N. Atkinson (w&c); Col Clement A. Evans	13th Georgia: Col James M. Smith; 26th Georgia: Cpt Benjamin F. Grace; 31st Georgia: Col Clement A. Evans; 38th Georgia: Cpt William L. McLeod; 60th Georgia: Col William H. Stiles; 61st Georgia: Col John H. Lamar (w), Maj Charles W. McArthur
Ewell's Division BG Jubal A. Early	Trimble's Brigade Col Robert Hoke	15th Alabama: Maj Alexander A. Lowther; 12th Georgia: Col Zephaniah T. Connor; 21st Georgia: Ltc Thomas W. Hooper; 21st North Carolina: Col Saunders Fulton; 1st North Carolina Battalion: Maj Rufus W. Wharton
Ewell's Division BG Jubal A. Early	Early's Brigade Col James A. Walker	13th Virginia: Ltc James B. Terrill; 25th Virginia: Ltc Patrick B. Duffy; 31st Virginia: Ltc Francis M. Boykin; 44th Virginia: Col Norvell Cobb, Cpt David W. Anderson; 49th Virginia: Col Jonathan C. Gibson; 52nd Virginia: Col Mathew G. Harmon; 58th Virginia: Col Francis H. Board
Ewell's Division BG Jubal A. Early	Hays' (First Louisiana) Brigade BG Harry T. Hays	5th Louisiana: Col Henry Forno; 6th Louisiana: Col William Monaghan; 7th Louisiana: Col Davidson B. Penn; 8th Louisiana: Ltc Trevanion D. Lewis; 9th Louisiana: Col Leroy A. Stafford
Ewell's Division BG Jubal A. Early	Artillery Cpt Joseph W. Latimer	Charlottesville (Virginia) Artillery: Cpt James McD. Carrington; Chesapeake (Maryland) Artillery: Lt John E. Plater; Courtney (Virginia) Artillery: Lt William A. Tanner; First Maryland Battery: Cpt William F. Dement; Louisiana Guard Battery: Cpt Louis E. D'Aquin (k); Staunton (Virginia) Artillery: Lt Asher W. Garber
Jackson's Division BG William B. Taliaferro	First (Paxton's) Brigade BG Elisha F. Paxton	2nd Virginia: Cpt John Q.A. Nadenbousch; 4th Virginia: Ltc Robert D. Gardner (w), Maj William Terry; 5th Virginia: Ltc Hazel J. Williams; 27th Virginia: Ltc James K. Edmondson; 33rd Virginia: Col Edwin G. Lee
Jackson's Division BG William B. Taliaferro	Second (Jones') Brigade BG John R. Jones	21st Virginia: Ltc John M. Patton; 42nd Virginia: Cpt Robert W. Withers; 48th Virginia: Col Thomas S. Garnett; 1st Virginia Battalion: Maj John Seddon
Jackson's Division BG William B. Taliaferro	Third (Taliaferro's) Brigade Col Edward T.H. Warren	47th Alabama: Col Michael J. Bulger; 48th Alabama: Col William M. Hardwick; 10th Virginia: Col Simeon B. Gibbons; 23rd Virginia: Ltc Simeon T. Walton; 37th Virginia: Col Titus V. Williams
Jackson's Division BG William B. Taliaferro	Fourth (Starke's) Brigade Col Edmund Pendleton	1st Louisiana: Ltc Michael Nolan; 2nd Louisiana: Col Jesse M. Williams, Maj Michael A. Grogan; 10th Louisiana: Ltc John M. Legett; 14th Louisiana: Cpt Henry M. Verlander; 15th Louisiana: Ltc McG. Goodwyn; Coppens' (Louisiana) Zouave Battalion: Ltc M. Alfred Coppens
Jackson's Division BG William B. Taliaferro	Artillery Cpt John B. Brockenbrough (w)	Carpenter's Alleghany (Virginia) battery: Lt George McKendree, Lt William T. Lambie (w); Danville (Virginia) Artillery: Cpt George W. Wooding (w), Lt Joseph H. Jones (w); Hampden (Virginia) Artillery: Cpt William H. Caskie; Lee (Virginia) Artillery: Lt Charles W. Stratham; 2nd Rockbridge (Virginia) battery: Lt George M. Lusk

=== Reserve Artillery ===
BG William N. Pendleton

Battalions	Batteries
Brown's Battalion Col J. Thompson Brown	Brooke's (Virginia)Warrenton Light Artillery battery;: Cpt James V. Brooke; Dance's battery, Powhatan Artillery: Cpt Willis J. Dance; Hupp's battery, Salem Artillery: Cpt Abraham Hupp; Poague's (Virginia) battery, Rockbridge Artillery: Cpt William T. Poague; Smith's battery, Richmond Third Howitzers: Lt. James S. Utz; Watson's battery, Richmond Second Howitzers: Cpt David Watson
Cutts' (Georgia) Battalion	Co. A, Sumter (Ga.) Flying Artillery Battalion (Ross's Battery): Cpt Hugh M. Ross; Co. B, Sumter (Ga.) Flying Artillery Battalion (Patterson's Battery): Cpt George M. Patterson; Co. C, Sumter (Ga.) Flying Artillery Battalion (Lane's Battery): Cpt John Lane
Nelson's Battalion Maj William Nelson	Kirkpatrick's (Virginia) battery, Amherst Artillery: Cpt Thomas J. Kirkpatrick; Massie's (Virginia) battery, Fluvanna Artillery: Cpt John L. Massie; Milledge's (Georgia) battery: Cpt John Milledge
Miscellaneous Batteries	Ells' Macon Light Artillery: Cpt Henry N. Ells; Nelson's (Virginia) battery, Hanover Artillery: Cpt George W. Nelson

=== Cavalry ===
Division	Brigade	Regiments and Others
MG James E.B. Stuart	First Brigade BG Wade Hampton	1st North Carolina: Col Laurence S. Baker; 1st South Carolina: Col John L. Black; 2nd South Carolina: Col Matthew C. Butler; Cobb (Georgia) Legion: Ltc Pierce M.B. Young; Phillip's (Georgia) Legion: Ltc William W. Rich
MG James E.B. Stuart	Second Brigade BG Fitzhugh Lee	1st Virginia: Col James H. Drake; 2nd Virginia: Col Thomas T. Munford; 3rd Virginia: Col Thomas H. Owen; 4th Virginia: Col Williams C. Wickham; 5th Virginia: Thomas L. Rosser
MG James E.B. Stuart	Third Brigade BG W.H.F. Lee	2nd North Carolina: Col Seth Williams; 9th Virginia: Col Richard L.T. Beale; 10th Virginia: Col J. Lucius Davis; 13th Virginia: Col John R. Chambliss, Jr.; 15th Virginia: Col William B. Ball
MG James E.B. Stuart	Fourth Brigade BG William E. Jones	6th Virginia: Col Julien Harrison; 7th Virginia: Col Richard H. Dulany; 12th Virginia: Col Asher W. Harman; 17th Virginia Battalion: Ltc Oliver R. Funsten; White's (Virginia) Battalion: Maj Elijah V. White
MG James E.B. Stuart	Artillery Maj John Pelham	Breathed's (Virginia) battery: Cpt James Breathed; Chew's (Virginia) battery: Cpt R. Preston Chew; Hart's (South Carolina) battery: Cpt James F. Hart; Henry's (Virginia) battery: Cpt Matthew W. Henry; Moorman's (Virginia) battery: Cpt Marcellus N. Moorman
