= Seven Days Battles order of battle: Confederate =

The following Confederate States Army units and commanders fought in the Seven Days Battles (from June 25 to July 1, 1862) of the American Civil War. Order of battle compiled from the army organization during the battle, the casualty returns and the reports. The Union order of battle is listed separately.

== Abbreviations used ==
=== Military rank ===
- Gen = General
- MG = Major General
- BG = Brigadier General
- Col = Colonel
- Ltc = Lieutenant Colonel
- Maj = Major
- Cpt = Captain
- Lt = Lieutenant

=== Other ===
- (w) = wounded
- (mw) = mortally wounded
- (k) = killed in action
- (c) = captured

== Army of Northern Virginia ==
Gen Robert E. Lee

=== Jackson's Command ===
MG Thomas J. Jackson

Division	Brigade	Regiments and Others
First (Whiting's) Division; BG William H.C. Whiting	First (Hood's) Brigade BG John B. Hood	18th Georgia: Ltc Solon Z. Ruff; 1st Texas: Col Alexis T. Rainey (w); 4th Texas: Col John Marshall (k), Cpt W. P. Townsend; 5th Texas: Col Jerome B. Robertson; Hampton's (South Carolina) Legion (Infantry Battalion): Ltc Martin W. Gary
First (Whiting's) Division; BG William H.C. Whiting	Third (Whiting's) Brigade Col Evander M. Law	4th Alabama: Ltc Owen K. McLemore (w), Cpt L. H. Scruggs; 2nd Mississippi: Col John M. Stone; 11th Mississippi: Col Philip F. Liddell; 6th North Carolina: Ltc Isaac E. Avery (w), Maj R. F. Webb
First (Whiting's) Division; BG William H.C. Whiting	Artillery	Balthis' Battery, Staunton (Virginia) Artillery: Cpt W. L. Balthis (w); Reilly's Battery, Rowan (North Carolina) Artillery: Cpt James Reilly
Second (Jackson's) Division; MG Thomas J. Jackson	First Brigade BG Charles S. Winder	2nd Virginia: Col James W. Allen (k), Ltc Lawson Botts; 4th Virginia: Col Charles A. Ronald; 5th Virginia: Col William S. Baylor; 27th Virginia: Col Andrew J. Grigsby (w), Cpt G.C. Smith; 33rd Virginia: Col John F. Neff; Carpenter's Battery, Allegheny (Virginia) Artillery: Lt John C. Carpenter; Poague's Battery, Rockbridge (Virginia) Artillery: Cpt William T. Poague
Second (Jackson's) Division; MG Thomas J. Jackson	Second Brigade Ltc Richard H. Cunningham, Jr. BG John R. Jones (w - White Oak Swamp)	21st Virginia: Ltc R. H. Cunningham Jr., Maj John B. Moseley; 42nd Virginia: Ltc William Martin; 48th Virginia: Cpt John M. Vermillion; 1st Virginia Battalion: Cpt B. W. Leigh; Caskie's Battery, Hampden (Virginia) Artillery: Cpt William H. Caskie
Second (Jackson's) Division; MG Thomas J. Jackson	Third Brigade Col Samuel V. Fulkerson (mw); Col Edward T. H. Warren; BG Wade Hampton	10th Virginia: Col Edward T. H. Warren; 23rd Virginia: Cpt A. V. Scott; 37th Virginia: Maj Titus V. Williams; Wooding's Battery, Danville (Virginia) Artillery: Cpt George W. Wooding
Second (Jackson's) Division; MG Thomas J. Jackson	Fourth Brigade BG Alexander Lawton	13th Georgia: Col Marcellus Douglass; 26th Georgia: Col Edmund N. Atkinson; 31st Georgia: Col Clement A. Evans (w); 38th Georgia: Ltc L. J. Parr (w), Cpt William H. Battey; 60th Georgia: Ltc W. H. Stiles; 61st Georgia: Col John H. Lamar
Third (Ewell's) Division; MG Richard S. Ewell	Fourth Brigade BG Arnold Elzey (w - Gaines' Mill); Col James A. Walker; BG Jubal Early	12th Georgia: Cpt James G. Rodgers; 13th Virginia: Col James A. Walker; 25th Virginia: Ltc John C. Higginbotham; 31st Virginia: Col John S. Hoffman; 44th Virginia: Ltc Norvell Cobb; 52nd Virginia: Ltc J. H. Skinner; 58th Virginia: Col Francis H. Board
Third (Ewell's) Division; MG Richard S. Ewell	Seventh Brigade BG Isaac R. Trimble	15th Alabama: Col James Cantey; 21st Georgia: Maj T. W. Hooper (w); 16th Mississippi: Col Carnot Posey; 21st North Carolina: Ltc William W. Kirkland; 1st North Carolina Battalion Sharpshooters: Maj Rufus W. Wharton; Courtney's Battery, Henrico (Virginia) Artillery: Cpt A. R. Courtney
Third (Ewell's) Division; MG Richard S. Ewell	Eight Brigade BG Richard Taylor; Col Isaac G. Seymour (k - Gaines' Mill); Col Leroy A. Stafford	6th Louisiana: Col Isaac G. Seymour (k - Gaines' Mill); 7th Louisiana: Ltc Davidson Bradfute Penn; 8th Louisiana: Col Henry B. Kelly; 9th Louisiana: Col Leroy A. Stafford; 1st Louisiana Special Battalion: Maj C.R. Wheat (k - Gaines' Mill); Carrington's Battery, Charlottesville (Virginia) Artillery: Cpt J. McDonald Carrington
Third (Ewell's) Division; MG Richard S. Ewell	Maryland Line Col Bradley T. Johnson	1st Maryland: Col Bradley T. Johnson; Brockenbrough's Battery, Baltimore (Maryland) Artillery: Cpt J. B. Brockenbrough
Unattached	Cavalry	2nd Virginia: Col Thomas T. Munford

=== D. H. Hill's Division ===
Division	Brigade	Regiments and Others
D. H. Hill's Division; MG Daniel H. Hill	First Brigade BG Robert E. Rodes; Col. John B. Gordon	3rd Alabama: Ltc Charles A. Battle; 5th Alabama: Col Charles C. Pegues (mw); 6th Alabama: Col John B. Gordon (w - Malvern Hill); 12th Alabama: Ltc Bristow B. Gayle; 26th Alabama: Col Edward O'Neal
D. H. Hill's Division; MG Daniel H. Hill	Second Brigade BG George B. Anderson (w - Malvern Hill); Col Charles C. Tew	2nd North Carolina: Col Charles C. Tew; 4th North Carolina: Col Bryan Grimes; 14th North Carolina: Col Risden T. Bennett; 30th North Carolina: Col Francis M. Parker
D. H. Hill's Division; MG Daniel H. Hill	Third Brigade BG Samuel Garland	5th North Carolina: Col Duncan K. McRae; 12th North Carolina: Col Benjamin O. Wade; 13th North Carolina: Col Alfred M. Scales; 20th North Carolina: Col Alfred Iverson, Jr. (w - Gaines' Mill), Ltc Franklin J. Faison (k), Maj William H. Toon; 23rd North Carolina: Col Daniel H. Christie (w), Lt I. J. Young (w)
D. H. Hill's Division; MG Daniel H. Hill	Fourth Brigade Col Alfred H. Colquitt	13th Alabama: Col Birkett D. Fry; 6th Georgia: Ltc J .M. Newton; 23rd Georgia: Col Emory F. Best; 27th Georgia: Col Levi B. Smith; 28th Georgia: Col Thomas J. Warthen (mw)
D. H. Hill's Division; MG Daniel H. Hill	Fifth Brigade BG Roswell S. Ripley	44th Georgia: Col Robert A. Smith (mw), Cpt John W. Beck; 48th Georgia: Col William Gibson; 1st North Carolina: Col Montford S. Stokes (mw), Cpt H. A. Brown, Ltc William P. Bynum; 3rd North Carolina: Col Gaston Meares (k), Ltc William L. De Rosset
D. H. Hill's Division; MG Daniel H. Hill	Artillery	Bondurant's Battery, Jeff Davis (Alabama) Artillery: Cpt J. W. Bondurant; Carter's Battery, King William (Virginia) Artillery: Cpt Thomas H. Carter; Nelson's Battery, Hanover (Virginia) Artillery: Cpt G. W. Nelson; Hardaway's (Alabama) Battery: Cpt Robert A. Hardaway
D. H. Hill's Division; MG Daniel H. Hill	Jones' Battalion Maj Hilary P. Jones	Clark's (Virginia) Battery: Cpt P. H. Clark; Peyton's Battery, Orange (Virginia) Artillery: Lt C. W. Fry; Rhett's (South Carolina) Battery: Cpt A. Burnet Rhett

=== Magruder's Command ===
MG John B. Magruder

Division	Brigade	Regiments and Others
First Division; BG David R. Jones	First Brigade BG Robert Toombs	2nd Georgia: Col Edgar M. Butt (w), Ltc William R. Holmes; 15th Georgia: Col William M. McIntosh (mw), Ltc William T. Millican, Maj T. J. Smith, Cpt S. Z. Hearns; 17th Georgia: Col Henry L. Benning; 20th Georgia: Col Jonathan B. Cumming
First Division; BG David R. Jones	Third (Jones') Brigade Col George T. Anderson	1st Georgia Regulars: Col William J. Magill; 7th Georgia: Ltc W. W. White (w), Maj E. W. Hoyle (w), Cpt George H. Carmical; 8th Georgia: Col Lucius M. Lamar (w&c), Cpt George O. Dawson; 9th Georgia: Col Richard A. Turnipseed; 11th Georgia: Ltc William Luffman
First Division; BG David R. Jones	Artillery Maj John J. Garnett	Wise (Virginia) Artillery: Cpt James S. Brown; Hart's Battery, Washington (South Carolina) Artillery: Cpt James F. Hart; Madison Louisiana Light Artillery: Cpt George V. Moody; Lane's Battery: Cpt John Lane; Woolfolk's Battery, Ashland (Virginia) Artillery: Lt James Woolfolk
McLaws' Division; MG Lafayette McLaws	First Brigade BG Paul J. Semmes	10th Georgia: Col Alfred Cumming (w - Malvern Hill), Cpt W. C. Holt; 53rd Georgia: Col Leonard T. Doyal; 5th Louisiana: Col Theodore G. Hunt; 10th Louisiana: Ltc Eugene Waggaman (w&c); 15th Virginia: Col Thomas P. August (w); 32nd Virginia: Ltc William R. Wilis; Manly's (North Carolina) Battery: Cpt Basil C. Manly
McLaws' Division; MG Lafayette McLaws	Fourth Brigade BG Joseph B. Kershaw	2nd South Carolina: Col John D. Kennedy, Maj F. Gaillard; 3rd South Carolina: Col James D. Nance; 7th South Carolina: Col D. Wyatt Aiken; 8th South Carolina: Col John W. Henagan; Kemper's Battery, Alexandria (Virginia) Artillery: Cpt Del Kemper
Magruder's Division; MG John B. Magruder	Second Brigade BG Howell Cobb	16th Georgia: Col Goode Bryan; 24th Georgia: Col Robert McMillan; Cobb's (Georgia) Legion; 2nd Louisiana: Col J. T. Norwood (mw); 15th North Carolina: Col Henry A. Dowd (w); Carlton's Battery, Troup (Georgia) Artillery: Cpt Henry H. Carlton
Magruder's Division; MG John B. Magruder	Third Brigade BG Richard Griffith (mw - Savage's Station); Col William Barksdale	13th Mississippi: Col William Barksdale, Ltc J. W. Carter (w), Maj Kennon McElroy; 17th Mississippi: Col William D. Holder (w), Ltc John C. Fiser; 18th Mississippi: Col Thomas Griffin (w), Ltc William H. Luse; 21st Mississippi: Col Benjamin G. Humphreys, Ltc William L. Brandon (w), Cpt William C. F. Brooks; McCarthy's (Virginia) Battery, 1st Richmond Howitzers: Cpt E. S. McCarthy
Magruder's Division; MG John B. Magruder	Artillery Col Stephen D. Lee	Page's Battery, Magruder (Virginia) Artillery: Cpt Thomas Jefferson Page, Jr.; Read's Battery, Pulaski (Georgia) Artillery: Cpt J. P. W. Read; Richardson's (Virginia) Battery: Cpt L. W. Richardson; Kirkpatrick's Battery, Amherst (Virginia) Artillery: Cpt Thomas H. J. Kirkpatrick

=== Longstreet's Division ===
Division	Brigade	Regiments and Others
Longstreet's Division MG James Longstreet; BG Richard H. Anderson	First Brigade BG James L. Kemper	1st Virginia: Cpt G. F. Norton; 7th Virginia: Col Waller T. Patton; 11th Virginia: Cpt Kirkwood Otey; 17th Virginia: Col Montgomery D. Corse; 24th Virginia: Ltc Peter Hairston; Rogers' (Virginia) Battery: Cpt Arthur L. Rogers
Longstreet's Division MG James Longstreet; BG Richard H. Anderson	Second Brigade BG Richard H. Anderson; Col Micah Jenkins	2nd South Carolina Rifles: Col John V. Moore; 4th South Carolina (Battalion): Maj C. B. Mattison; 5th South Carolina: Ltc Andrew Jackson (w); 6th South Carolina: Ltc John M. Steedman (w); Palmetto (South Carolina) Sharpshooters: Col Micah Jenkins, Ltc Joseph Walker
Longstreet's Division MG James Longstreet; BG Richard H. Anderson	Third Brigade BG George Pickett (w - Gaines' Mill); Col Eppa Hunton; Col John B. Strange	8th Virginia: Col Eppa Hunton; 18th Virginia: Col Robert E. Withers (w); 19th Virginia: Col John B. Strange, Captain Charles S. Peyton; 28th Virginia: Col Robert C. Allen; 56th Virginia: Col William D. Stuart
Longstreet's Division MG James Longstreet; BG Richard H. Anderson	Fourth Brigade BG Cadmus M. Wilcox	8th Alabama: Ltc Y. L. Royston (w); 9th Alabama: Maj J. H. J. Williams, Cpt J. H. King (w); 10th Alabama: Col John J. Woodward (k), Maj J. H. Caldwell (w); 11th Alabama: Ltc S. F. Hale (w), Cpt George Field (w); Anderson's Battery, Thomas (Virginia) Artillery: Cpt Edwin J. Anderson
Longstreet's Division MG James Longstreet; BG Richard H. Anderson	Fifth Brigade BG Roger A. Pryor	14th Alabama: Ltc D. W. Baine (k); 2nd Florida: Col Edward A. Perry (w - Glendale); 14th Louisiana: Col Richard W. Jones; 1st Louisiana Zouave Battalion: Ltc Georges A.G. De Coppens; 3rd Virginia: Ltc Joseph V. Scott (w); Donaldsonville Louisiana Artillery: Cpt Victor Maurin
Longstreet's Division MG James Longstreet; BG Richard H. Anderson	Sixth Brigade BG Winfield S. Featherston (w - Glendale); BG George B. Anderson	12th Mississippi: Maj W. H. Lilly (w), Cpt S. B. Thomas; 19th Mississippi: Maj John Mullins (w); 2nd Mississippi Infantry Battalion: Ltc John G. Taylor (k); Smith's (Virginia) Battery, 3rd Richmond Howitzers: Cpt Benjamin H. Smith, Jr.
Longstreet's Division MG James Longstreet; BG Richard H. Anderson	Artillery	Washington Louisiana (Artillery) Battalion: Col James B. Walton

=== Huger's Division ===
Division	Brigade	Regiments and Others
Huger's Division; MG Benjamin Huger	Second Brigade BG William Mahone	6th Virginia: Col George T. Rogers; 12th Virginia: Col David A. Weisiger; 16th Virginia: Ltc Joseph H. Ham; 41st Virginia: Ltc William A. Parham (w); 49th Virginia: Col William Smith; Grimes' (Virginia) Battery: Cpt Carey F. Grimes; Moorman's (Virginia) Battery: Cpt M. N. Moorman
Huger's Division; MG Benjamin Huger	Third Brigade BG Ambrose R. Wright	44th Alabama: Col James Kent; 3rd Georgia: Maj J. R. Sturges (k), Cpt R. B. Nisbet; 4th Georgia: Col George P. Doles (w - Malvern Hill); 22nd Georgia: Col Robert H. Jones, Maj Joseph Wasden; 1st Louisiana: Ltc W. R. Shivers (w), Cpt M. Nolan; Huger's (Virginia) Battery: Cpt Frank Huger; Ross' Battery: Cpt H. M. Ross
Huger's Division; MG Benjamin Huger	Fourth Brigade BG Lewis A. Armistead	9th Virginia: Ltc James S. Gilliam; 14th Virginia: Col James G. Hodges; 38th Virginia: Col Edward C. Edmonds; 53rd Virginia: Cpt William R. Aylett, Maj George M. Waddill, Cpt R. W. Martin, Col H. B. Tomlin; 57th Virginia: Ltc Waddy T. James; 5th Virginia Battalion: Cpt William E. Alley; Stribling's (Virginia) Battery, Fauquier Artillery: Cpt Robert M. Stribling; Turner's (Virginia) Battery: Cpt William H. Turner
Huger's Division; MG Benjamin Huger	Ransom's Brigade (Second Brigade from the Department of North Carolina) BG Robert Ransom, Jr.	24th North Carolina: Col William J. Clarke; 25th North Carolina: Col Henry M. Rutledge; 26th North Carolina: Col Zebulon B. Vance; 35th North Carolina: Col Matthew W. Ranson (w), Ltc O. C. Petway (k); 48th North Carolina: Col Robert C. Hill; 49th North Carolina: Col Stephen D. Ramseur (w - Malvern Hill)
Huger's Division; MG Benjamin Huger	Walker's Brigade (Fourth Brigade from the Department of North Carolina) BG John G. Walker (w - Malvern Hill); Col Van H. Manning	3rd Arkansas: Col Van H. Manning; 2nd Georgia Battalion: Maj George W. Ross; 27th North Carolina: Col John R. Cooke; 46th North Carolina: Col Edward D. Hall; 30th Virginia: Col Archibald T. Harrison; Goodwyn's (Virginia) Cavalry: Cpt Edward A. Goodwyn

=== A. P. Hill's Light Division ===
Division	Brigade	Regiments and Others
A.P. Hill's Light Division; MG Ambrose P. Hill	First Brigade BG Charles W. Field	40th Virginia: Col John M. Brockenbrough; 47th Virginia: Col Robert M. Mayo; 55th Virginia: Col Francis Mallory; 60th Virginia: Col William E. Starke (w), Ltc B. H. Jones, Maj J. C. Summers
A.P. Hill's Light Division; MG Ambrose P. Hill	Second Brigade BG Maxcy Gregg	1st South Carolina: Col Daniel H. Hamilton; 1st South Carolina Rifles: Col John F. Marshall; 12th South Carolina: Col Dixon Barnes (w); 13th South Carolina: Col Oliver Edwards; 14th South Carolina: Col Samuel McGowan (w)
A.P. Hill's Light Division; MG Ambrose P. Hill	Third Brigade BG Joseph R. Anderson (w - Glendale); Col Edward L. Thomas	14th Georgia: Col Robert W. Folsom (w); 35th Georgia: Col Edward L. Thomas (w - Mechanicsville); 45th Georgia: Col Thomas Hardeman (w); 49th Georgia: Col Andrew J. Lane (w); 3rd Louisiana Battalion: Ltc Edward Pendleton
A.P. Hill's Light Division; MG Ambrose P. Hill	Fourth Brigade BG Lawrence O'Bryan Branch	7th North Carolina: Col Reuben P. Campbell (k), Ltc E. Graham Haywood (w), Maj J. L. Hill; 18th North Carolina: Col Robert H. Cowan; 28th North Carolina: Col James H. Lane (w); 33rd North Carolina: Ltc Robert F. Hoke; 37th North Carolina: Col Charles C. Lee (k), Ltc William Barbour
A.P. Hill's Light Division; MG Ambrose P. Hill	Fifth Brigade BG James J. Archer	5th Alabama Battalion: Maj Albert S. Vandegraaf (w); 19th Georgia: Ltc Thomas C. Johnson (mw); 1st Tennessee (Provisional Army): Ltc James C. Shackelford (mw); 7th Tennessee: Col John F. Goodner (w); 14th Tennessee: Col William A. Forbes
A.P. Hill's Light Division; MG Ambrose P. Hill	Sixth Brigade BG William D. Pender (w - Glendale); Ltc John McElroy	2nd Arkansas Battalion: Maj William N. Bronaugh (k - Mechanicsville); 16th North Carolina: Ltc John McElroy; 22nd North Carolina: Col James Conner (w - Gaines' Mill), Ltc R. H. Gray; 34th North Carolina: Col Richard H. Riddick (w); 38th North Carolina: Col William J. Hoke (w); 22nd Virginia Battalion: Cpt J. C. Johnson
A.P. Hill's Light Division; MG Ambrose P. Hill	Artillery Ltc Lewis M. Coleman	Andrews' (Maryland) Battery: Cpt R. Snowden Andrews; Bachman's (South Carolina) Battery: Cpt William K. Bachman; Braxton's (Virginia) Battery, Fredericksburg Artillery: Cpt Carter M. Braxton; Crenshaw's (Virginia) Battery: Cpt William G. Crenshaw; Johnson's (Virginia) Battery: Cpt Marmaduke Johnson; McIntosh's Battery, Pee Dee (South Carolina) Artillery: Cpt David G. McIntosh; Pegram's (Virginia) Battery: Cpt William J. Pegram

=== Department of North Carolina ===
Division	Brigade	Regiments and Others
Department of North Carolina; MG Theophilus H. Holmes	Third Brigade Col Junius Daniel	43rd North Carolina: Col Thomas S. Kenan; 45th North Carolina: Ltc J. H. Morehead; 50th North Carolina: Col Marshall D. Craton; Burroughs' Cavalry Battalion: Maj Edgar Burroughs
Department of North Carolina; MG Theophilus H. Holmes	Artillery Col James Deshler	Branch's (Virginia) Battery: Cpt James R. Branch; Brem's (North Carolina) Battery: Cpt T. H. Brem; French's (Virginia) Battery: Cpt David A. French; Graham's (Virginia) Battery: Cpt Edward Graham
Department of North Carolina; MG Theophilus H. Holmes	Wise's Command BG Henry A. Wise	26th Virginia: Col Powahtan R. Page; 46th Virginia: Col Richard T.W. Duke; 4th Virginia Heavy Artillery; Andrews' (Virginia) Battery: Cpt W. G. Andrews; Rives' (Virginia) Battery: Cpt J. H. Rives

=== Artillery Reserve ===
Division	Battalions	Batteries
Artillery Reserve; BG William N. Pendleton	1st Virginia Artillery Col J. Thompson Brown	Richmond Fayette Artillery: Lt William I. Clopton; Coke's (Williamsburg) Battery: Cpt John A. Coke; Watson's Battery: Cpt David Watson
Artillery Reserve; BG William N. Pendleton	Nelson's Battalion Maj William Nelson	Huckstep's (Virginia) Battery: Cpt Charles T. Huckstep; Page's Battery: Cpt R. C. M. Page
Artillery Reserve; BG William N. Pendleton	Richardson's Battalion Maj Charles Richardson	Ancell's (Virginia) Battery: Cpt John J. Ancell; Milledge's (Georgia) Battery: Cpt John Milledge Jr.; Davidson's Battery, Letcher (Virginia) Artillery: Cpt Greenlee Davidson; Masters' (Virginia) Battery: Cpt Leander Masters
Artillery Reserve; BG William N. Pendleton	Sumter (Georgia) Artillery Ltc Allen S. Cutts	Blackshear's Battery: Cpt James A. Blackshear; Price's Battery: Cpt John V. Price
Artillery Reserve; BG William N. Pendleton	Miscellaneous	Chapman's Battery, Dixie (Virginia) Artillery: Cpt W. H. Chapman; Dabney's (Virginia) Battery: Cpt W. J. Dabney; Dearing's (Lynchburg) Battery: Cpt James Dearing; Grimes' (Virginia) Portsmouth Battery: Cpt Carey F. Grimes; Hamilton's Battery: Cpt B. P. Hamilton

=== Cavalry ===
Brigade	Regiments and Others
Cavalry BG J.E.B. Stuart	1st North Carolina: Ltc James B. Gordon, Col Lawrence S. Baker; 1st Virginia: Col Fitzhugh Lee; 3rd Virginia: Col Thomas F. Goode; 4th Virginia: Cpt F. W. Chamberlayne; 5th Virginia: Col Thomas L. Rosser (w - Mechanicsville); 9th Virginia: Col William H. F. Lee; 10th Virginia: Col J. Lucius Davis; Cobb's Legion: Col Thomas R. R. Cobb; Critcher's (Virginia) Battalion: Maj J. Critcher; Hampton's (South Carolina) Legion: Cpt Thomas E. Screven; Jeff. Davis Legion: Ltc William T. Martin; Stuart Horse Artillery: Cpt John Pelham
