= Siege of Petersburg order of battle: Confederate =

The following Confederate States Army units and commanders fought in the siege of Petersburg of the American Civil War. The following order of battle is the organization from the Confederate forces near Petersburg of October 27, 1864.

== Abbreviations used ==
=== Military rank ===
- Gen = General
- LTG = Lieutenant General
- MG = Major General
- BG = Brigadier General
- Col = Colonel
- Ltc = Lieutenant Colonel
- Maj = Major
- Cpt = Captain
- Lt = Lieutenant

=== Other ===
- w = wounded
- mw = mortally wounded
- k = killed

== Confederate forces near Petersburg ==
Gen Robert E. Lee

=== Army of Northern Virginia ===
Gen Robert E. Lee

- Provost Guard: Maj. David B. Bridgford
  - 5th Alabama Battalion
  - 1st Virginia Battalion
  - 48th Georgia (1 company)
  - 39th Virginia Cavalry Battalion
- Engineers: MG Jeremy Francis Gilmer
  - 1st Confederate Engineers
  - 2nd Confederate Engineers

==== First Corps ====
LTG James Longstreet

Division	Brigade	Regiments and Others
Kershaw's Division; MG Joseph B. Kershaw (Kershaw's Division was sent to join Early in the Valley on 7 August 1864, left the Valley on 14 September 1864, and then rejoined Early in the Valley 26 September 1864. It finally returned to Petersburg by 21 November 1864.)	Kershaw's Brigade Col John Doby Kennedy	2nd South Carolina; 3rd South Carolina; 7th South Carolina; 8th South Carolina; 15th South Carolina; 20th South Carolina; 3rd South Carolina Battalion
Kershaw's Division; MG Joseph B. Kershaw (Kershaw's Division was sent to join Early in the Valley on 7 August 1864, left the Valley on 14 September 1864, and then rejoined Early in the Valley 26 September 1864. It finally returned to Petersburg by 21 November 1864.)	Wofford's Brigade BG Dudley M. Du Bose	16th Georgia; 18th Georgia; 24th Georgia; Cobb's (Georgia) Legion; Phillips' (Georgia) Legion; 3rd Georgia Sharpshooter Battalion
Kershaw's Division; MG Joseph B. Kershaw (Kershaw's Division was sent to join Early in the Valley on 7 August 1864, left the Valley on 14 September 1864, and then rejoined Early in the Valley 26 September 1864. It finally returned to Petersburg by 21 November 1864.)	Humphreys' Brigade Maj George B. Gerald	13th Mississippi; 17th Mississippi; 18th Mississippi; 21st Mississippi
Kershaw's Division; MG Joseph B. Kershaw (Kershaw's Division was sent to join Early in the Valley on 7 August 1864, left the Valley on 14 September 1864, and then rejoined Early in the Valley 26 September 1864. It finally returned to Petersburg by 21 November 1864.)	Bryan's Brigade Col James P. Simms	10th Georgia; 50th Georgia; 51st Georgia; 53rd Georgia
Field's Division; MG Charles W. Field	Bratton's Brigade BG John Bratton; Col Joseph Walker	1st South Carolina; 2nd South Carolina Rifles; 5th South Carolina; 6th South Carolina; Palmetto Sharpshooters
Field's Division; MG Charles W. Field	Law's Brigade Col William F. Perry	4th Alabama; 15th Alabama; 44th Alabama; 47th Alabama; 48th Alabama
Field's Division; MG Charles W. Field	Anderson's Brigade BG George T. Anderson	7th Georgia; 8th Georgia; 9th Georgia; 11th Georgia; 59th Georgia
Field's Division; MG Charles W. Field	Gregg's Brigade (Gregg was killed 7 October 1864, and Bass was wounded the same day. Winkler commanded after this.) BG John Gregg; Col Frederick S. Bass; Ltc Clinton McK. Winkler	3rd Arkansas; 1st Texas; 4th Texas; 5th Texas
Field's Division; MG Charles W. Field	Benning's Brigade BG Henry L. Benning	2nd Georgia; 15th Georgia; 17th Georgia; 20th Georgia
Pickett's Division; MG George E. Pickett	Terry's Brigade BG William R. Terry	1st Virginia; 3rd Virginia; 7th Virginia; 11th Virginia; 24th Virginia
Pickett's Division; MG George E. Pickett	Hunton's Brigade BG Eppa Hunton	8th Virginia; 18th Virginia; 19th Virginia; 28th Virginia; 56th Virginia
Pickett's Division; MG George E. Pickett	Steuart's Brigade BG George H. Steuart	9th Virginia; 14th Virginia; 38th Virginia; 53rd Virginia; 57th Virginia
Pickett's Division; MG George E. Pickett	Corse's Brigade BG Montgomery D. Corse	15th Virginia; 17th Virginia; 29th Virginia; 30th Virginia; 32nd Virginia
Corps Artillery; BG Edward Porter Alexander	Huger's Battalion Ltc Frank Huger	Fickling's (South Carolina) Battery; Poindexter's (Louisiana) Battery; Parker's (Virginia) Battery; Smith's (Virginia) Battery; Taylor's (Virginia) Battery; Woolfolk's (Virginia) Battery
Corps Artillery; BG Edward Porter Alexander	Haskell's Battalion Maj John C. Haskell	Flanner's (North Carolina) Battery; Garden's (South Carolina) Battery; Lamkin's (Virginia) Battery; Ramsay's (North Carolina) Battery
Corps Artillery; BG Edward Porter Alexander	Cabell's Battalion Col Henry C. Cabell	Callaway's (Georgia) Battery; Carlton's (Georgia) Battery; Anderson's (Virginia) Battery; Manly's (North Carolina) Battery
Corps Artillery; BG Edward Porter Alexander	1st Virginia Artillery Battalion	Dance's (Virginia) Battery; Smith's (Virginia) Battery; Graham's (Virginia) Battery; Griffin's (Virginia) Battery
Corps Artillery; BG Edward Porter Alexander	Johnson's Battalion	Pollock's (Virginia) Battery; Wilkes' (Virginia) Battery
Corps Artillery; BG Edward Porter Alexander	Stark's Battalion	Green's (Virginia) Battery; Armistead's (Virginia) Battery; French's (Virginia) Battery

==== Third Corps ====
LTG A. P. Hill

Division	Brigade	Regiments and Others
Mahone's Division; BG William Mahone	Sander' Brigade Col Joseph H. King	8th Alabama; 9th Alabama; 10th Alabama; 11th Alabama; 14th Alabama
Mahone's Division; BG William Mahone	Harris' Brigade BG Nathaniel H. Harris	12th Mississippi; 16th Mississippi; 19th Mississippi; 48th Mississippi
Mahone's Division; BG William Mahone	Mahone's Brigade BG David A. Weisiger	6th Virginia; 12th Virginia; 16th Virginia; 41st Virginia; 61st Virginia
Mahone's Division; BG William Mahone	Wright's Brigade Col William Gibson	3rd Georgia; 22nd Georgia; 48th Georgia; 64th Georgia; 2nd Georgia Battalion; 10th Georgia Battalion
Mahone's Division; BG William Mahone	Finnegan's Brigade BG Joseph Finegan; Col Theodore W. Brevard, Jr.	2nd Florida; 5th Florida; 8th Florida; 9th Florida; 10th Florida; 11th Florida
Heth's Division; MG Henry Heth	Davis' Brigade BG Joseph R. Davis	1st Confederate Battalion; 2nd Mississippi; 11th Mississippi; 26th Mississippi; 42nd Mississippi; 55th North Carolina
Heth's Division; MG Henry Heth	Cooke's Brigade BG John R. Cooke	15th North Carolina; 27th North Carolina; 46th North Carolina; 48th North Carolina
Heth's Division; MG Henry Heth	MacRae's Brigade BG William MacRae	11th North Carolina; 26th North Carolina; 44th North Carolina; 47th North Carolina; 52nd North Carolina
Heth's Division; MG Henry Heth	Archer's Brigade BG James J. Archer (Archer was in command until 16 October 1864. Mayo then took over. Archer received a furlough and died 24 October 1864.); Col Robert M. Mayo	13th Alabama; 1st Tennessee (Provisional Army); 7th Tennessee; 14th Tennessee; 2nd Maryland; 40th Virginia; 47th Virginia; 55th Virginia; 22nd Virginia Battalion
Wilcox's Division; MG Cadmus M. Wilcox	Lane's Brigade BG James H. Lane	7th North Carolina; 18th North Carolina; 28th North Carolina; 33rd North Carolina; 37th North Carolina
Wilcox's Division; MG Cadmus M. Wilcox	Scales' Brigade BG Alfred M. Scales	13th North Carolina; 16th North Carolina; 22nd North Carolina; 34th North Carolina; 38th North Carolina
Wilcox's Division; MG Cadmus M. Wilcox	McGowan's Brigade BG Samuel McGowan	1st South Carolina (Provisional Army); 1st South Carolina (Orr's Rifles); 12th South Carolina; 13th South Carolina; 14th South Carolina
Wilcox's Division; MG Cadmus M. Wilcox	Thomas's Brigade BG Edward L. Thomas	14th Georgia; 35th Georgia; 45th Georgia; 49th Georgia
Corps Artillery; Col R. Lindsay Walker	Cutts' Battalion Col Allen S. Cutts	Patterson's (Georgia) Battery; Ross's (Georgia) Battery; Wingfield's (Georgia) Battery
Corps Artillery; Col R. Lindsay Walker	McIntosh's Battalion Ltc David G. McIntosh	Dement's (Maryland) Battery; Chesapeake (Maryland) Battery; Hurt's (Alabama) Battery; Price's (Virginia) Battery; Donald's (Virginia) Battery
Corps Artillery; Col R. Lindsay Walker	Pegram's Battalion Ltc William J. Pegram	Brander's (Virginia) Battery; Ellett's (Virginia) Battery; Cayce's (Virginia) Battery; Gregg's (South Carolina) Battery
Corps Artillery; Col R. Lindsay Walker	Poague's Battalion Ltc William T. Poague	Utterback's (Virginia) Battery; Richard's (Mississippi) Battery; William's (North Carolina) Battery; Johnston's (Virginia) Battery; Penick's (Virginia) Battery
Corps Artillery; Col R. Lindsay Walker	Richardson's Battalion Ltc Charles Richardson	Grandy's (Virginia) Battery; Landry's (Louisiana) Battery; Moore's (Virginia) Battery
Corps Artillery; Col R. Lindsay Walker	Washington (Louisiana) Artillery Battalion: Ltc Benjamin F. Eshleman	First Company; Second Company; Third Company; Fourth Company

==== Fourth Corps ====
LTG Richard H. Anderson

Division	Brigade	Regiments and Others
Johnson's Division; MG Bushrod Johnson	Elliott's Brigade BG William Henry Wallace	17th South Carolina; 18th South Carolina; 22nd South Carolina; 23rd South Carolina; 26th South Carolina
Johnson's Division; MG Bushrod Johnson	Gracie's Brigade BG Archibald Gracie, Jr.	41st Alabama; 43rd Alabama; 59th Alabama; 60th Alabama; 23rd Alabama Sharpshooter Battalion
Johnson's Division; MG Bushrod Johnson	Ransom's Brigade BG Matt Whitaker Ransom	24th North Carolina; 25th North Carolina; 35th North Carolina; 49th North Carolina; 56th North Carolina
Johnson's Division; MG Bushrod Johnson	Wise's Brigade Col. J. Thomas Goode	26th Virginia; 34th Virginia; 46th Virginia; 59th Virginia
Hoke's Division; MG Robert F. Hoke	Martin's Brigade BG William Whedbee Kirkland	17th North Carolina; 42nd North Carolina; 66th North Carolina
Hoke's Division; MG Robert F. Hoke	Clingman's Brigade Col. Hector McKethan	8th North Carolina; 31st North Carolina; 51st North Carolina; 61st North Carolina
Hoke's Division; MG Robert F. Hoke	Hagood's Brigade BG Johnson Hagood	11th South Carolina; 21st South Carolina; 25th South Carolina; 27th South Carolina
Hoke's Division; MG Robert F. Hoke	Colquitt's Brigade BG Alfred H. Colquitt	6th Georgia; 19th Georgia; 23rd Georgia; 27th Georgia; 28th Georgia
Corps Artillery; Col Hilary P. Jones	38th Virginia Artillery Battalion Ltc John P.W. Read	Blount's (Virginia) Battery; Sullivan's (Virginia) Battery; Macon's (Virginia) Battery; Marshall's (Virginia) Battery
Corps Artillery; Col Hilary P. Jones	Moseley's Artillery Battalion Ltc Edgar F. Moseley	Young's (Virginia) Battery; Miller's (North Carolina) Battery; Slaten's (Georgia) Battery; Cumming's (North Carolina) Battery
Corps Artillery; Col Hilary P. Jones	Boggs' Artillery Battalion Maj Francis J. Boggs	Darracott's (Virginia) Battery; Martin's (Virginia) Battery
Corps Artillery; Col Hilary P. Jones	Coit's Artillery Battalion Maj James C. Coit	Wright's (Virginia) Battery; Pegram's (Virginia) Battery; Bradford's (Mississippi) Battery; Kelly's (South Carolina) Battery

==== Cavalry Corps ====
MG Wade Hampton III

Division	Brigade	Regiments and Others
Butler's Division; BG Matthew C. Butler	Young's Brigade BG Pierce M. B. Young	10th Georgia Cavalry: Col Valentine H. Taliaferro; Cobb's (Georgia) Legion Cavalry: Col Gilbert J. Wright; Phillips' (Georgia) Legion Cavalry: Col William W. Rich; Jeff. Davis (Mississippi) Legion Cavalry: Ltc J. Fred Waring
Butler's Division; BG Matthew C. Butler	Dunovant's Brigade BG John Dunovant (k); Col Benjamin H. Rutledge	4th South Carolina Cavalry: Col Benjamin H. Rutledge, Ltc William Stokes; 5th South Carolina Cavalry: Ltc Robert J. Jeffords (k), Cpt Zimmerman Davis; 6th South Carolina Cavalry: Col Hugh A. Aiken (k), Ltc Lovick P. Miller
Fitzhugh Lee's Division; BG Thomas L. Rosser	Wickham's Brigade Col Thomas T. Munford	1st Virginia Cavalry: Ltc William A. Morgan; 2nd Virginia Cavalry: Ltc Cary Breckinridge; 3rd Virginia Cavalry: Ltc William R. Carter (mw), Maj Henry Carrington; 4th Virginia Cavalry: Col William H.F. Payne
Fitzhugh Lee's Division; BG Thomas L. Rosser	Rosser's Brigade Col Oliver R. Funsten Sr.	7th Virginia Cavalry: Ltc Thomas C.A. Marshall (w), Maj Samuel B. Myers; 11th Virginia Cavalry: Ltc Mottrom D. Ball; 12th Virginia. Cavalry: Ltc Thomas B. Massie (w), Maj John L. Knott; 35th Virginia Cavalry Battalion: Ltc Elijah V. White
Fitzhugh Lee's Division; BG Thomas L. Rosser	Payne's Brigade BG Lunsford L. Lomax	5th Virginia Cavalry: Col Reuben B. Boston (c), Ltc James H. Allen; 6th Virginia Cavalry: Ltc Daniel T. Richards; 15th Virginia. Cavalry: Ltc John Cooper
W.H.F. Lee's Division; MG W.H.F. Lee	Barringer's Brigade BG Rufus Barringer	1st North Carolina Cavalry: Ltc William H.H. Cowles; 2nd North Carolina Cavalry: Col William P. Roberts; 3rd North Carolina Cavalry: Col John A. Baker (c), Ltc Roger Moore; 5th North Carolina Cavalry: Col James H. McNeill
W.H.F. Lee's Division; MG W.H.F. Lee	Chambliss's Brigade BG John R. Chambliss (k); Col J. Lucius Davis	9th Virginia Cavalry: Ltc Thomas Waller; 10th Virginia Cavalry: Col J. Lucius Davis, Ltc Robert Caskie (w), Maj William R. Clement; 13th Virginia Cavalry: Col Jefferson Phillips
W.H.F. Lee's Division; MG W.H.F. Lee	Dearing's Brigade BG James Dearing	8th Georgia Cavalry: Col Joel R. Griffin; 4th North Carolina Cavalry: Col Dennis D. Ferebee; 16th North Carolina Cavalry Battalion: Col John T. Kennedy
Horse Artillery; Maj R. Preston Chew	Breathed's Battalion Maj James Breathed (w) Cpt William McGregor	Hart's (South Carolina) Battery: Cpt James F. Hart (w), Lt E. Lindsley Halsey; McGregor's (Virginia) Battery: Cpt William McGregor, Lt George W. Brown; Graham's (Virginia) Battery: Cpt Archibald Graham

=== Department of Richmond ===
LTG Richard S. Ewell

Brigade	Regiments and Others
Johnson's Brigade Col John M. Hughs	17th/23rd Tennessee: Col Richard H. Keeble (k), Col Horace Ready; 25th/44th Tennessee: Ltc Robert B. Snowden (w), Cpt Jonathan E. Spencer; 63rd Tennessee: Col Abram Fulkerson (w&c), Ltc William H. Fulkerson
Gary's Cavalry Brigade BG Martin Witherspoon Gary	7th Georgia Cavalry: Ltc Joseph L. McAllister (mw), Maj Edward C. Anderson Jr. (w), Cpt John M. Davies; Infantry Battalion, Hampton's (South Carolina) Legion (Mounted): Col Thomas M. Logan (w), Ltc Robert B. Arnold; 7th South Carolina Cavalry: Col Alexander C. Haskell (w), Maj Edward Boykin; 24th Virginia Cavalry: Col William T. Robins (w), Ltc Theophilus G. Barham

=== Richmond forces ===
MG James L. Kemper

Brigade	Regiments and Others
Local Defense Brigade MG G.W.C. Lee	1st Virginia Battalion, Local Defense Troops: Cpt A.J. Suddith; 2nd Virginia Local Defense Troops: Ltc D.E. Scruggs; 3rd Virginia Local Defense Troops: Ltc John McAnerney Jr.; 4th Virginia Battalion, Local Defense Troops: Cpt Martin W. Curlin; 5th Virginia Battalion, Local Defense Troops: Cpt Philip J. Ennis; 2nd Virginia Battalion, Reserves: Ltc John H. Guy; VMI Cadet Battalion (1 company): Cpt Andrew Pizzini; Richmond Ambulance Company: Maj John Dooley
Barton's Command BG Seth Barton	18th Georgia Battalion: Maj William S. Basinger; 25th Virginia Battalion: Ltc Wyatt M. Elliot; 1st Virginia Battalion, Reserves: Ltc Richard T.W. Duke; 3rd Virginia Battalion, Reserves: Ltc F.H. Archer; 4th Virginia Battalion, Reserves: Maj D.E. Godwin
Independent Richmond Cavalry	1st Virginia Cavalry Battalion, Local Defense Troops: Maj Samuel A. Swann

=== Post of Richmond ===
BG William M. Gardner

Division	Brigade	Regiments and Others
Artillery Defenses; Ltc John C. Pemberton
Artillery Defenses; Ltc John C. Pemberton	First Division (Inner Line) Ltc John W. Atkinson	10th Virginia Heavy Artillery Battalion: Maj James O. Hensley; 19th Virginia Heavy Artillery Battalion: Maj N.R. Cary
Artillery Defenses; Ltc John C. Pemberton	Second Division (Inner Line) Ltc James Howard	18th Virginia Heavy Artillery Battalion: Maj Mark B. Hardin; 20th Virginia Heavy Artillery Battalion: Maj James E. Robertson
Artillery Defenses; Ltc John C. Pemberton	Lightfoot's Artillery Battalion Ltc Charles E. Lightfoot	Hudgins’ (Virginia) Artillery: Cpt Robert E. Hudgins; Rives' (Virginia) Artillery: Cpt J. Henry Rives; Barham's (Virginia) Artillery: Lt William R. Barham
Miscellaneous Artillery
Miscellaneous Artillery	Chaffin's Bluff Maj William S. Basinger	Guerrant's (Virginia) Artillery: Lt John Guerrant; Davis' (Virginia) Artillery: Lt Lemuel T. Davis; Allen's (Virginia) Artillery: Cpt William T. Allen (w); Jones' (Virginia) Artillery: Cpt Andrew J. Jones; Winder's (Virginia) Artillery: Cpt Charles S. Winder
Miscellaneous Artillery	9th Georgia Artillery Battalion Maj. Augustin Leyden	Company A: Cpt William A. Barnes; Company B: Cpt Edwin H. Guess; Company C: Cpt Andrew M. Wolihin; Company D: Cpt Tyler M. Peeples; Company E: Cpt William S. Everett
Miscellaneous Artillery	Naval Batteries Lt Charles W. Hays	Battery Semmes; Battery Brooke; Battery Wood

=== Department of North Carolina and Southern Virginia ===
Gen Pierre Gustave Toutant Beauregard

Division	Brigade	Regiments and Others
1st Military District; BG Henry A. Wise
1st Military District; BG Henry A. Wise	Walker's Brigade BG James A. Walker	1st Virginia Reserves: Col Benjamin L. Farinholt; 3rd Virginia Reserves: Col Richard A. Booker; 5th Virginia Battalion, Reserves: Col Patrick M. Henry; Withers' Virginia Battalion, Reserves: Col Robert E. Withers; Maurin's Artillery: Maj Victor A. Maurin
1st Military District; BG Henry A. Wise	Post of Petersburg	Holcombe (South Carolina) Legion: Col William J. Crawley; 44th Virginia Battalion: Maj Peter V. Batte (c), Cpt Thomas W. Branch; Hood's Virginia Battalion, Reserves: Ltc William H. Hood; Independent Signal Corps: Maj James F. Milligan; Hobson's Company, Second Class Militia: Cpt Owen H. Hobson
1st Military District; BG Henry A. Wise	Fort Clifton ↵Ltc Henry T. Guion	34th Virginia (detachment); Miller's (North Carolina) Artillery (detachment)
1st Military District; BG Henry A. Wise	Garnett's Brigade at Hicksford Ltc John J. Garnett	Confederate States Zouave Battalion: Marie Alfred Coppens; Company H, 62nd Georgia Cavalry: Cpt Thomas R. Janes; Bradford's (Mississippi) Artillery (section): Lt Andrew J. Cochran
1st Military District; BG Henry A. Wise	High Bridge	6th Virginia Battalion, Reserves: Ltc Robert Smith
1st Military District; BG Henry A. Wise	Mattoax Bridge	7th Virginia Battalion, Reserves: Maj George Chrisman
1st Military District; BG Henry A. Wise	Staunton River Bridge	8th Virginia Battalion, Reserves: Maj William A.J. Miller
1st Military District; BG Henry A. Wise	Danville Virginia	4th Virginia Reserves: Maj David B. Godwin; 9th Virginia Battalion, Reserves: Maj Archibald Taylor; 10th Virginia Battalion, Reserves: Maj William W. Byrd; 11th Virginia Battalion, Reserves: Ltc Samuel M. Wallace
1st Military District; BG Henry A. Wise	Drewry's Bluff	Coleman's (Virginia) Heavy Artillery: Cpt Wiley G. Coleman; Drewry's (Virginia) Heavy Artillery: Cpt Augustus Drewry; Marine Battalion (Companies A, B and C): Cpt John R. Tucker
1st Military District; BG Henry A. Wise	Smith's Artillery Battalion	Epes' (Virginia) Artillery: Cpt Branch J. Epes; Kevill's (Virginia) Artillery: Cpt Thomas Kevill; Battery Danztler
