= Appomattox campaign order of battle: Confederate =

The following Confederate States Army units and commanders fought in the final military encounter of the American Civil War, the 1865 Appomattox campaign, which lasted from March 29 to April 9 and resulted in Confederate surrender on April 9 at the Appomattox Court House. Order of battle has been compiled from the army organization during the campaign. The Union order of battle is listed separately.

== Abbreviations used ==
=== Military rank ===
- Gen = General
- LTG = Lieutenant General
- MG = Major General
- BG = Brigadier General
- Col = Colonel
- Ltc = Lieutenant Colonel
- Maj = Major
- Cpt = Captain
- Lt = Lieutenant
- Sgt = Sergeant

=== Other ===
- (w) = wounded
- (mw) = mortally wounded
- (k) = killed in action
- (c) = captured

== Army of Northern Virginia ==
Gen Robert E. Lee, Commanding
Staff:

- Chief of staff: Ltc Walter H. Taylor
- Assistant adjutants general: Col Charles S. Venable, Col Charles Marshall
- Assistant Inspector General: Maj Giles B. Cooke
- Chief of artillery: BG William N. Pendleton

| Division | Brigade | Regiments and others |
|---|---|---|
| Headquarters units | Escort | 39th Virginia Cavalry Battalion: Cpt Samuel B. Brown |
| Headquarters units | Provost Guard Maj D. B. Bridgford | 1st Virginia Battalion; 44th Virginia Battalion, Company B |
| Headquarters units | Engineers Col T. M. R. Talcott | 1st Confederate Engineers; 2nd Confederate Engineers |

=== First Corps ===
LTG James Longstreet
Staff:

- Corps medical director: Surgeon John Cullen

| Division | Brigade | Regiments and others |
|---|---|---|
| Pickett's Division MG George E. Pickett | Steuart's Brigade BG George H. Steuart | 9th Virginia Infantry: Cpt John P. Wilson, Jr.; 14th Virginia Infantry: Maj William D. Shelton; 38th Virginia Infantry: Col George K. Griggs; 53rd Virginia Infantry: Cpt Henry Edmunds; 57th Virginia Infantry: Ltc William H. Ramsey |
| Pickett's Division MG George E. Pickett | Corse's Brigade BG Montgomery D. Corse (c, April 6); Col Arthur Herbert | 15th Virginia Infantry: Maj Charles H. Clarke; 17th Virginia Infantry: Col Arthur Herbert; 29th Virginia Infantry: Lt John A. Coulson; 30th Virginia Infantry: Col Robert S. Chew; 32nd Virginia Infantry: Cpt Samuel W. Armistead |
| Pickett's Division MG George E. Pickett | Hunton's Brigade BG Eppa Hunton (c, April 6); Maj Michael P. Spessard | 8th Virginia Infantry; 18th Virginia Infantry: Lt Charles H. Wilkinson; 19th Virginia Infantry: Maj. Waller M. Boyd (c., April 6), Lt. James Y. Bragg; 28th Virginia Infantry: Maj Michael P. Spessard; 56th Virginia Infantry: Cpt John W. Jones |
| Pickett's Division MG George E. Pickett | Terry's Brigade BG William R. Terry (w, March 31); Col Joseph Mayo, Jr. Maj William W. Bentley | 1st Virginia Infantry: Ltc Francis H. Langley (c, April 6); 3rd Virginia Infantry; 7th Virginia Infantry: Col Charles C. Flowerree (c, April 6); 11th Virginia Infantry; 24th Virginia Infantry: Ltc Richard L. Maury (c, April 7), Maj William W. Bentley |
| Field's Division MG Charles W. Field | Perry's Brigade BG William F. Perry | 4th Alabama Infantry: Ltc Lawrence H. Scruggs; 15th Alabama Infantry: Col Alexander A. Lowther; 44th Alabama Infantry: Ltc John A. Jones; 47th Alabama Infantry: Cpt Eli D. Clower; 48th Alabama Infantry: Maj John W. Wigginton |
| Field's Division MG Charles W. Field | Anderson's Brigade BG George T. Anderson | 7th Georgia Infantry: Col George H. Carmical; 8th Georgia Infantry: Col John R. Towers; 9th Georgia Infantry: Maj John W. Arnold; 11th Georgia Infantry: Cpt William H. Ramsey; 59th Georgia Infantry: Col Jack Brown |
| Field's Division MG Charles W. Field | Benning's Brigade BG Henry L. Benning | 2nd Georgia Infantry: Cpt Thomas Chaffin, Jr.; 15th Georgia Infantry: Maj Peter J. Shannon; 17th Georgia Infantry: Maj James B. Moore; 20th Georgia Infantry |
| Field's Division MG Charles W. Field | Gregg's Brigade Col R. M. Powell | 3rd Arkansas Infantry: Ltc Robert S. Taylor; 1st Texas Infantry: Col Frederick S. Bass; 4th Texas Infantry: Ltc Clinton M. Winkler; 5th Texas Infantry: Cpt W. T. Hill |
| Field's Division MG Charles W. Field | Bratton's Brigade BG John Bratton | 1st South Carolina Infantry: Col James R. Hagood; 5th South Carolina Infantry: Col Asbury Coward; 6th South Carolina Infantry: Col John M. Steedman; 2nd South Carolina Rifles: Col Robert E. Bowen; Palmetto (South Carolina) Sharpshooters |
| Kershaw's Division MG Joseph B. Kershaw (c, April 6) | DuBose's Brigade BG Dudley M. DuBose (c, April 6); Cpt J. F. Espy | 16th Georgia Infantry: Lt William W. Montgomery; 18th Georgia Infantry: Cpt J. F. Espy, Lt Gideon J. Lasseter; 24th Georgia Infantry: Cpt J. A. Jarrard; 3rd Georgia Sharpshooters Battalion; Cobb's (Georgia) Legion: Lt W. G. Steed; Phillips' (Georgia) Legion: Lt A. J. Reese |
| Kershaw's Division MG Joseph B. Kershaw (c, April 6) | Humphreys' Brigade Col William H. Fitzgerald (c, April 6); Cpt Gwin R. Cherry | 13th Mississippi Infantry: Lt W. H. Davis; 17th Mississippi Infantry: Cpt Gwin R. Cherry; 18th Mississippi Infantry: Lt John W. Gower; 21st Mississippi Infantry: Lt Benjamin George |
| Kershaw's Division MG Joseph B. Kershaw (c, April 6) | Simms' Brigade BG James P. Simms (c, April 6); Cpt George W. Waldron | 10th Georgia Infantry: Lt John B. Evans; 50th Georgia Infantry: Cpt George W. Waldron, Lt Hillary W. Cason; 51st Georgia Infantry: Cpt H. R. Thomas; 53rd Georgia Infantry: Cpt R. H. Woods |
| Artillery BG Edward P. Alexander | Cabell's Battalion Maj S. P. Hamilton | Pulaski (Georgia) Artillery; Carlton's (Georgia) Battery; 1st Company Richmond Howitzers (Virginia); Manly's (North Carolina) Battery |
| Artillery BG Edward P. Alexander | Huger's Battalion Maj Tyler C. Jordan | Madison Louisiana Light Artillery: Lt George Poindexter; Fickling's (South Carolina) Battery: Lt E. L. Purse; Parker's (Virginia) Battery: Lt Edwin S. Wooldridge; Virginia Battery: Cpt John Donneli Smith; Taylor's (Virginia) Battery: Lt John H. Weddell; Virginia Battery: Lt James Woolfolk |
| Artillery BG Edward P. Alexander | Haskell's Battalion Maj John C. Haskell | North Carolina Battery: Cpt Henry G. Flanner; Ramsay's (North Carolina) Battery: Lt Jesse F. Woodard; South Carolina Battery: Cpt Hugh R. Garden; Lamkin's (Virginia) Battery: Lt Fletcher T. Massie |

=== Second Corps ===
MG John B. Gordon
Staff:

- Assistant adjutant general: Maj Robert W. Hunter

| Division | Brigade | Regiments and others |
|---|---|---|
| Formerly Ramseur's Division MG Bryan Grimes | Battle's Brigade Col Edwin L. Hobson | 3rd Alabama Infantry: Cpt Cornelius Robinson, Jr.; 5th Alabama Infantry: Col Edwin L. Hobson, Cpt Thomas M. Riley; 6th Alabama Infantry: Maj Isaac F. Culver; 12th Alabama Infantry: Cpt Poleman D. Rose; 61st Alabama Infantry: Cpt Augustus B. Fanin, jr |
| Formerly Ramseur's Division MG Bryan Grimes | Grimes' Brigade Col David G. Cowand | 32nd North Carolina Infantry: Cpt P. C. Shuford; 43rd North Carolina Infantry: Cpt Wiley J. Cobb; 45th North Carolina Infantry: Col John R. Winston; 53rd North Carolina Infantry: Cpt Thomas E. Ashcraft; 2nd North Carolina Battalion |
| Formerly Ramseur's Division MG Bryan Grimes | Cox's Brigade BG William Ruffin Cox | 1st North Carolina Infantry: Maj Louis C. Latham; 2nd North Carolina Infantry: Maj James T. Scales; 3rd North Carolina: Maj William T. Ennett; 4th North Carolina Infantry: Cpt John B. Forcum; 14th North Carolina Infantry: Ltc William A. Johnston.; 30th North Carolina Infantry: Cpt David C. Allen |
| Formerly Ramseur's Division MG Bryan Grimes | Cook's Brigade Ltc Edwin A. Nash | 4th Georgia: Col Edwin A. Nash, Cpt John M. Shiver; 12th Georgia: Cpt Josiah N. Beall; 21st Georgia: Cpt Edward Smith; 44th Georgia: Cpt John A. Tucker; Co.B - Sumter Georgia Artillery |
| Formerly Ramseur's Division MG Bryan Grimes | Archer's Battalion Ltc Fletcher H. Archer | 3rd Battalion Virginia Reserves: Cpt Joseph A. Rogers; 44th Virginia Battalion: Cpt Anson B. Morrison |
| Formerly J. Pegram's Division BG James A. Walker | R.D. Johnston's Brigade Col John W. Lea | 5th North Carolina Infantry: Col John W. Lea, Cpt James M. Taylor; 12th North Carolina Infantry: Cpt P. Durham; 20th North Carolina Infantry: Lt Archibald F. Lawhon; 23rd North Carolina Infantry: Cpt Abner D. Peace; 1st North Carolina Sharpshooters Battalion: Lt R. W. Woodruff |
| Formerly J. Pegram's Division BG James A. Walker | Lewis' Brigade BG William G. Lewis (w, April 7); Cpt John Beard | 6th North Carolina Infantry: Cpt Joseph H. Dickey; 21st North Carolina Infantry: Cpt John H. Miller; 54th North Carolina Infantry; 57th North Carolina Infantry: Cpt John Beard |
| Formerly J. Pegram's Division BG James A. Walker | Walker's Brigade Maj Henry K. Douglas | 13th Virginia Infantry: Cpt George Cullen; 31st Virginia Infantry: Maj William P. Cooper; 49th Virginia Infantry: Cpt William D. Moffett; 52nd Virginia Infantry: Cpt Samuel W. Paxton; 58th Virginia Infantry: Lt Robert L. Waldron |
| Gordon's Division BG Clement A. Evans | Evans' Brigade Col John H. Lowe | 13th Georgia Infantry: Ltc Richard Maltbie; 26th Georgia Infantry: Cpt James Knox; 31st Georgia Infantry: Cpt Edward C. Perry; 38th Georgia Infantry: Ltc Philip E. Davant; 60th Georgia Infantry: Col Waters B. Jones; 61st Georgia Infantry: Col Waters B. Jones; 9th Georgia Artillery Battalion: Sgt. Horace L. Cranford; 12th Georgia Artillery Battalion: Cpt Samuel H. Crump; 18th Georgia Battalion: Cpt George W. Stiles |
| Gordon's Division BG Clement A. Evans | Terry's Brigade Col Titus V. Williams | 2nd Virginia Infantry: Cpt Joseph J. Jenkins; 4th Virginia Infantry: Cpt Hamilton D. Wade; 5th Virginia Infantry: Cpt Peter E. Wilson; 10th Virginia Infantry: Ltc D. H. Lee Martz; 21st Virginia Infantry: Col William A. Witcher; 23rd Virginia Infantry: Ltc John P. Fitzgerald; 25th Virginia Infantry: Maj Wilson Harper; 27th Virginia Infantry: Cpt Franklin C. Wilson; 33rd Virginia Infantry: Cpt Henry A. Herrell; 37th Virginia Infantry: Cpt John A. Preston; 42nd Virginia Infantry: Lt James L. Tompkins; 44th Virginia Infantry: Maj David W. Anderson; 48th Virginia Infantry: Col Robert H. Dunagan |
| Gordon's Division BG Clement A. Evans | York's Brigade Col Eugene Waggaman | 1st Louisiana Infantry; 2nd Louisiana Infantry: Cpt A. S. Blythe; 5th Louisiana Infantry: Lt Hiram Baxter; 6th Louisiana Infantry: Maj William H. Manning; 7th Louisiana Infantry; 8th Louisiana Infantry: Cpt Louis Prados; 9th Louisiana Infantry; 10th Louisiana Infantry; 14th Louisiana Infantry; 15th Louisiana Infantry: Col Edmund Pendleton |
| Artillery BG Armistead L. Long | Nelson's Battalion Ltc William Nelson | Amherst (Virginia) Artillery; Milledge's (Georgia) Artillery; Fluvanna (Virginia) Artillery |
| Artillery BG Armistead L. Long | Braxton's Battalion Ltc Carter M. Braxton | Alleghany (Virginia) Artillery; Lee (Virginia) Battery; Stafford (Virginia) Artillery |
| Artillery BG Armistead L. Long | Cutshaw's Battalion Ltc Wilfred Emory Cutshaw (w, April 6); Cpt C. W. Fry | Jeff Davis (Alabama) Artillery; King William (Virginia) Artillery; Morris (Virginia) Artillery; Orange (Virginia) Artillery; Staunton (Virginia) Artillery; Richmond Howitzers, 2nd Company |
| Artillery BG Armistead L. Long | Hardaway's Battalion Ltc Robert A. Hardaway | Powhatan Artillery (Virginia); 3rd Company, Richmond Howitzers (Virginia); Rockbridge Artillery (Virginia); Salem Flying Artillery (Virginia) |
| Artillery BG Armistead L. Long | Johnson's Battalion Ltc Marmaduke Johnson | Clutter's (Virginia) Battery: Lt Lucas McIntosh.; Fredericksburg Artillery (Virginia): Cpt John G. Pollock |
| Artillery BG Armistead L. Long | Lightfoot's Battalion | Caroline Artillery (Virginia); Nelson Artillery (Virginia); Surry Artillery (Virginia) |
| Artillery BG Armistead L. Long | Stark's Battalion Ltc Alexander W. Stark | Louisiana Guard Battery (Green's); McComas Artillery/French's Battery (Virginia): Cpt David A. French; Armistead's Battery/Matthew's Artillery (Virginia): Cpt Andrew D. Armistead |

=== Third Corps ===
LTG A. P. Hill (k, April 2)

Provost Guard

- 5th Alabama Battalion: Cpt Wade Ritter

| Division | Brigade | Regiments and others |
|---|---|---|
| Mahone's Division MG William Mahone | Forney's Brigade BG William H. Forney | 8th Alabama Infantry: Ltc John P. Emrich; 9th Alabama Infantry: Maj James M. Crow; 10th Alabama Infantry: Maj Louis W. Johnson; 11th Alabama Infantry: Cpt Martin L. Stewart; 13th Alabama Infantry: Cpt Samuel Sellers; 14th Alabama Infantry: Cpt John A. Terrell |
| Mahone's Division MG William Mahone | Weisiger's Brigade BG David A. Weisiger | 6th Virginia Infantry: Col George T. Rogers; 12th Virginia Infantry: Maj Richard W. Jones; 16th Virginia Infantry: Ltc Richard O. Whitehead; 41st Virginia Infantry: Ltc Joseph P. Minetree; 61st Virginia Infantry: Col Virginius D. Groner |
| Mahone's Division MG William Mahone | Harris' Brigade BG Nathaniel H. Harris | 12th Mississippi Infantry: Cpt A. K. Jones; 16th Mississippi Infantry: Ltc James H. Duncan; 19th Mississippi Infantry: Col Richard W. Phipps; 48th Mississippi Infantry: Col Joseph M. Jayne |
| Mahone's Division MG William Mahone | Sorrel's Brigade Col George Edward Tayloe | 3rd Georgia Infantry: Ltc Claiborne Snead; 22nd Georgia Infantry: Cpt George W. Thomas; 48th Georgia Infantry: Cpt Alexander C. Flanders; 64th Georgia Infantry: Cpt James G. Brown; 2nd Georgia Battalion: Maj Charles J. Moffett; 10th Georgia Battalion: Cpt Caleb F. Hill |
| Mahone's Division MG William Mahone | Finegan's Brigade BG Theodore W. Brevard, Jr. (c, April 6); Col David Lang | 2nd Florida Infantry: Col Walter R. Moore; 5th Florida Infantry; 8th Florida Infantry: Maj Thomas E. Clarke; 9th Florida Infantry; 10th Florida Infantry: Col Charles F. Hopkins; 11th Florida Infantry |
| Heth's Division MG Henry Heth | Davis' Brigade BG Joseph R. Davis | 1st Confederate Battalion: Cpt Anthony B. Bartlett; 2nd Mississippi Infantry; 11th Mississippi; 26th Mississippi Infantry; 42nd Mississippi Infantry |
| Heth's Division MG Henry Heth | Cooke's Brigade BG John R. Cooke | 15th North Carolina Infantry: Col William H. Yarborough; 27th North Carolina Infantry: Ltc Joseph C. Webb; 46th North Carolina Infantry: Col William L. Saunders; 48th North Carolina Infantry: Col Samuel H. Walkup; 55th North Carolina Infantry: Cpt Walter A. Whitted |
| Heth's Division MG Henry Heth | MacRae's Brigade BG William MacRae | 11th North Carolina Infantry: Col William J. Martin; 26th North Carolina Infantry: Ltc James T. Adams; 44th North Carolina Infantry: Maj Charles M. Stedman; 47th North Carolina Infantry; 52nd North Carolina Infantry: Ltc Eric Erson |
| Heth's Division MG Henry Heth | McComb's Brigade BG William McComb | 2nd Maryland Battalion: Cpt John W. Torsch; 1st Tennessee Infantry (Provisional Army): Maj Felix G. Buchanan; 7th Tennessee Infantry: Ltc Samuel G. Shepard; 14th Tennessee Infantry: Maj James H. Johnson; 17th Tennessee Infantry: Col Horace Ready; 23rd Tennessee Infantry: Col Horace Ready; 25th Tennessee Infantry; 44th Tennessee Infantry; 63rd Tennessee Infantry |
| Wilcox's Division MG Cadmus M. Wilcox | Thomas' Brigade BG Edward L. Thomas | 14th Georgia Infantry: Col Richard P. Lester; 35th Georgia Infantry: Col Bolling H. Holt; 45th Georgia Infantry: Col Thomas J. Simmons; 49th Georgia Infantry: Maj James B. Duggan |
| Wilcox's Division MG Cadmus M. Wilcox | Lane's Brigade BG James H. Lane | 18th North Carolina Infantry: Maj Thomas J. Wooten; 28th North Carolina Infantry: Cpt T. James Linebarger; 33rd North Carolina Infantry: Col Robert V. Cowan; 37th North Carolina Infantry: Maj Jackson L. Bost |
| Wilcox's Division MG Cadmus M. Wilcox | McGowan's Brigade BG Samuel McGowan | 1st South Carolina Infantry (Provisional Army): Ltc Andrew P. Butler; 12th South Carolina Infantry: Cpt J. C. Bell; 13th South Carolina Infantry: Col Isaac F. Hunt; 14th South Carolina Infantry: Ltc Edward Croft; Orr's (South Carolina) Rifles: Ltc James T. Robertson |
| Wilcox's Division MG Cadmus M. Wilcox | Scales' Brigade Col Joseph H. Hyman | 13th North Carolina Infantry: Ltc E. Benton Withers; 16th North Carolina Infantry: Col William A. Stowe; 22nd North Carolina Infantry: Col Thomas S. Galloway, jr; 34th North Carolina Infantry: Ltc George M. Norment; 38th North Carolina Infantry: Col John Ashford, Ltc George W. Flowers |
| Artillery Col R. Lindsay Walker | McIntosh's Battalion Ltc William M. Owen | Hurt's (Alabama) Battery: Lt George A. Ferrell; 1st Battery, Washington Artillery (Louisiana): Cpt Edward Owen; Chew's (Maryland) Battery; Chamberlayne's (Virginia) Battery; Donald's (Virginia) Battery: Lt William T. Wilson; Rockbridge (Virginia) Artillery, 2nd Battery: Cpt Berryman Z. Price |
| Artillery Col R. Lindsay Walker | Pegram's Battalion Col William J. Pegram (mw, April 2); Ltc Joseph McGraw | South Carolina Battery: Cpt Thomas E. Gregg; Virginia Battery: Cpt George M. Cayce; Virginia Battery: Cpt Thomas Ellett; Brander's (Virginia) Battery: Lt James E. Tyler |
| Artillery Col R. Lindsay Walker | Poague's Battalion Ltc William T. Poague | Richards' (Mississippi) Battery: Lt John W. Yeargain; North Carolina Battery: Cpt Arthur B. Williams; Albemarle (Virginia) Artillery: Cpt Charles F. Johnston; Brooke (Virginia) Artillery: Cpt Addison W. Utterback; Lewis' (Virginia) Battery: Cpt Nathan Penick |
| Artillery Col R. Lindsay Walker | Thirteenth Virginia Battalion no commander listed | Otey Battery: Cpt David N. Walker; Ringgold Battery: Cpt Crispin Dickenson |
| Artillery Col R. Lindsay Walker | Richardson's Battalion Ltc Charles Richardson | Donaldsonville Louisiana Artillery: Cpt R. Prosper Landry; Moore's (Virginia) Battery; Grandy's (Virginia) Battery; Huger Artillery |
| Artillery Col R. Lindsay Walker | Lane's Battalion Maj John Lane | Ross' (Georgia) Battery; Patterson's (Georgia) Battery; Irwin (Georgia) Artillery |
| Artillery Col R. Lindsay Walker | Washington Artillery Ltc Benjamin F. Eshleman | 1st Company (Louisiana); 2nd Company (Louisiana); 3rd Company (Louisiana); 4th Company (Louisiana) |

=== Fourth Corps ===
LTG Richard H. Anderson

| Division | Brigade | Regiments and others |
|---|---|---|
| Johnson's Division MG Bushrod R. Johnson; BG William H. Wallace | Wallace's Brigade BG William H. Wallace | 17th South Carolina Infantry: Cpt E. A. Crawford; 18th South Carolina Infantry: Ltc W. B. Allison; 22nd South Carolina Infantry: Col William G. Burt; 23rd South Carolina Infantry: Ltc John M. Kinloch; 26th South Carolina Infantry: Maj Ceth S. Land; Holcombe (South Carolina) Legion |
| Johnson's Division MG Bushrod R. Johnson; BG William H. Wallace | Moody's Brigade BG Young M. Moody (c, April 8); Col Martin L. Stansel | 41st Alabama Infantry: Col Martin L. Stansel; 43rd Alabama Infantry: Maj William J. Mims; 59th Alabama Infantry: Maj Lewis H. Crumpler; 60th Alabama Infantry: Col John W. A. Sanford; 23rd Alabama Battalion: Maj Nicholas Stallworth |
| Johnson's Division MG Bushrod R. Johnson; BG William H. Wallace | Wise's Brigade BG Henry A. Wise | 26th Virginia Infantry: Maj William K. Perrin; 34th Virginia Infantry: Col John Thomas Goode; 46th Virginia Infantry; 59th Virginia Infantry: Col William B. Tabb |
| Johnson's Division MG Bushrod R. Johnson; BG William H. Wallace | Ransom's Brigade BG Matthew W. Ransom | 24th North Carolina Infantry; 25th North Carolina Infantry: Col Henry M. Rutledge; 35th North Carolina Infantry: Maj Robert E. Petty; 49th North Carolina Infantry: Maj Charles Q. Petty; 56th North Carolina Infantry: Col Paul F. Faison |
| Artillery Col Hilary P. Jones | Coit's Battalion Maj James C. Coit | Wright's (Virginia) Battery; Pegram's (Virginia) Battery; Bradford's (Mississippi) Battery |
| Artillery Col Hilary P. Jones | Blount's Battalion Maj Joseph G. Blount | Georgia Battalion: Cpt C. W. Slaten; Cumming's (North Carolina) Battery: Lt Alexander D. Brown; Miller's (North Carolina) Battery; Young's (Virginia) Battery |
| Artillery Col Hilary P. Jones | Stribling's Battalion Maj Robert M. Stribling | Dickerson's (Virginia) Battery; Marshall's (Virginia) Battery: Lt T. Marshall Archer; Macon's (Virginia) Battery; Sullivan's (Virginia) Battery: Lt William S. Archer |
| Artillery Col Hilary P. Jones | Smith's Battalion Cpt William F. Dement | 1st Maryland Battery: Lt John Gale; Johnston's (Virginia) Battery: Lt Thomas R. Adams; Neblett's (Virginia) Battery: Lt Robert J. Braswell; Virginia Battery: Cpt John W. Drewry; Virginia Battery: Cpt Thomas Kevill |
| Artillery Col Hilary P. Jones | Sturdivant's Battalion Cpt N. A. Sturdivant | Martin's (Virginia) Battery; Sturdivant's (Virginia) Battery |

=== Cavalry Corps ===
MG Fitzhugh Lee

| Division | Brigade | Regiments and others |
|---|---|---|
| Fitzhugh Lee's Division Col Thomas T. Munford | Munford's Brigade | 1st Virginia Cavalry: Col William A. Morgan; 2nd Virginia Cavalry: Ltc Cary Breckinridge; 3rd Virginia Cavalry; 4th Virginia Cavalry: Col William B. Wooldridge |
| Fitzhugh Lee's Division Col Thomas T. Munford | Payne's Brigade BG William H. F. Payne (w, March 30); Col Reuben B. Boston (k, April 6) | 5th Virginia Cavalry: Col Reuben B. Boston; 6th Virginia Cavalry; 8th Virginia Cavalry; 36th Virginia Cavalry Battalion |
| Fitzhugh Lee's Division Col Thomas T. Munford | Gary's Brigade BG Martin W. Gary | 7th Georgia Cavalry: Cpt William H. Burroughs; 7th South Carolina Cavalry: Col Alexander C. Haskell; Hampton Legion (South Carolina): Ltc Robert B. Arnold; 24th Virginia Cavalry: Col William T. Robins |
| W. H. F. Lee's Division MG William. H. F. Lee | Barringer's Brigade BG Rufus Barringer (c, April 3) | 1st North Carolina Cavalry; 2nd North Carolina Cavalry; 3rd North Carolina Cavalry; 5th North Carolina Cavalry |
| W. H. F. Lee's Division MG William. H. F. Lee | Beale's Brigade Cpt Samuel H. Burt | 9th Virginia Cavalry; 10th Virginia Cavalry; 13th Virginia Cavalry; 14th Virginia Cavalry |
| W. H. F. Lee's Division MG William. H. F. Lee | Robert's Brigade BG William P. Roberts | 4th North Carolina Cavalry; 16th North Carolina Cavalry Battalion |
| Rosser's Division MG Thomas L. Rosser | Dearing's Brigade BG James Dearing (mw, April 6); Lt. Col. Elijah V. White | 7th Virginia Cavalry; 11th Virginia Cavalry; 12th Virginia Cavalry: Col Asher W. Harman; 35th Virginia Cavalry Battalion: Lt. Col. Elijah V. White |
| Rosser's Division MG Thomas L. Rosser | McCausland's Brigade | 16th Virginia Cavalry; 17th Virginia Cavalry; 21st Virginia Cavalry; 22nd Virginia Cavalry |
| Horse Artillery Ltc R. Preston Chew | Breathed's Battalion Maj James Breathed | Johnston's (Virginia) Battery; Shoemaker's (Virginia) Battery; Thomson's (Virginia) Battery |
| Horse Artillery Ltc R. Preston Chew | Chew's Battalion | Graham's (Virginia) Battery; McGregor's (Virginia) Battery |

=== Department of Richmond ===
LTG Richard S. Ewell (c, April 6)
Ltc Thomas J. Spencer

| Division | Brigade | Regiments and others |
|---|---|---|
| G. W. C. Lee's Division; MG G.W.C. Lee (c, April 6) | Barton's Brigade BG Seth M. Barton (c, April 6) | 40th Virginia Infantry; 47th and 50th Virginia Infantry; 22nd Virginia Infantry Battalion; 25th Virginia Infantry Battalion |
| G. W. C. Lee's Division; MG G.W.C. Lee (c, April 6) | Moore's Brigade BG Patrick T. Moore | 2nd Virginia Local Defense Troops; 3rd Virginia Local Defense Troops; 1st Virginia Reserves; 2nd Virginia Reserves; 1st Virginia Reserves Battalion: Ltc Richard T.W. Duke (c, April 6); 2nd Virginia Reserves Battalion |
| G. W. C. Lee's Division; MG G.W.C. Lee (c, April 6) | Artillery Brigade Col Stapleton Crutchfield (k, April 6); 2nd Lt Kena K. Chapman | 10th Virginia Heavy Artillery Battalion; 18th Virginia Heavy Artillery Battalion; 19th Virginia Heavy Artillery Battalion; 20th Virginia Heavy Artillery Battalion; 18th Georgia Heavy Artillery Battalion |
| Other units | Drewry's Bluff garrison Maj F. W. Smith (k, April 5) | Young's Howitzers (Virginia); Johnston (Eppes) Heavy Artillery (Virginia); Neblett's Artillery (Virginia); Lunenburg Heavy Artillery (Virginia); Pamunkey Heavy Artillery (Virginia); Southside Heavy Artillery (Virginia); United Artillery/Kevill's Company (Virginia) |
| Other units | Naval Brigade Commodore John R. Tucker (c, April 6), Lt Washington Gwathmey | Composed of sailors from the James River Squadron |
| Other units | Unattached units | Chaffin's Bluff: Ltc J. M. Maury; Marines: Cpt John D. Simms (c, April 6) |

=== Department of North Carolina and Southern Virginia ===
| Division | Brigade | Regiments and others |
|---|---|---|
| First Military District BG Henry A. Wise | Petersburg Maj W. H. Ker | 3rd Virginia Reserves Battalion; 44th Virginia Battalion |
| First Military District BG Henry A. Wise | Unattached units | Hood's Battalion, Virginia Militia; Second-class militia; Independent Signal Corps |
