= Seven Days Battles order of battle =

The order of battle for the Seven Days Battles includes:

- Seven Days Battles order of battle: Confederate
- Seven Days Battles order of battle: Union
