= Kirkwood Otey =

Kirkwood Otey (October 18, 1832 – June 1, 1897) served as the commanding officer of the 11th Virginia Infantry in the Confederate Army of Northern Virginia during the American Civil War.

== Early life ==
Otey was a cadet at the Virginia Military Institute in 1849.

== Civil War service ==
Otey commanded the regiment first as a major, then as a colonel in the years 1864–1865, until General Robert E. Lee's surrender to General Ulysses S. Grant at Appomattox Court House, Virginia, on April 9, 1865. While still a major in command of the 11th Virginia, Otey was wounded in the shoulder by shrapnel during the unsuccessful frontal assault known as Pickett's Charge near Gettysburg, Pennsylvania. This occurred on the third and final day of the Battle of Gettysburg (the bloodiest and probably most decisive engagement of the conflict), on July 3, 1863. Otey survived, however, and would serve as commanding colonel of the unit until the war ended.

== Postbellum ==
Otey died in 1897 and is buried in Lynchburg, Virginia's Spring Hill Cemetery next to his wife.
