= Pee Dee Light Artillery =

- Active: August 1861 - April 26, 1865
- Country: Confederate States of America
- Allegiance: Confederate
- Branch: Confederate States Army
- Type: Artillery battery
- Part of: Army of Northern Virginia, Army of Tennessee
- Engagements: Seven Days Battles; Battle of Antietam; Battle of Fredericksburg; Battle of Gettysburg; Battle of Rivers' Bridge

The Pee Dee Light Artillery was a distinguished Confederate light artillery battery during the American Civil War. The origins of the battery began as the Darlington Guards, a local militia of Darlington, South Carolina. The Darlington Guards volunteered their service to South Carolina on January 4, 1861, for a period of six months. These men were the very first soldiers to volunteer to fight in Civil War. They became Company B, First South Carolina Volunteers, commanded by Captain F.F. Warley and Lieutenant David Gregg McIntosh. After six months on the Charleston, South Carolina, coast and a short campaign in Virginia, the unit was released. Half the unit remained with Captain Warley and served the remainder of the war as the Darlington Guards. The other half reformed in Darlington, South Carolina, under McIntosh. The unit called themselves the Pee Dee Rifles and in August 1861 rendered their service as an infantry unit to the Confederate States of America for the duration of the war. While in training in Suffolk, Virginia, in the winter of 1861-62, the unit was reorganized as Company D, First South Carolina Regiment, a light artillery battery, and became the Pee Dee Light Artillery.

In 1862, the battery was assigned to General A.P. Hill’s Light Artillery Division and fought in the Seven Days Battles. During that battle, two horses were shot from beneath Captain McIntosh in a single day. Afterwards, the battery was reorganized under General Stonewall Jackson’s famous Second Corps. The battery fought with General Jackson at the Battles of Cedar Mountain, Second Manassas, Chantilly, Harpers Ferry, Sharpsburg and the Fredericksburg. In 1863, the battery fought in the Battle of Chancellorsville and the Battle of Gettysburg. In 1864, the battery did not have enough men and horses to effectively operate in battle. In June 1864, the battery exchanged service with Charles Battery serving in the Charleston Harbor. In 1864 the Pee Dee Light Artillery served around Charleston Harbor until they were utilized in an effort to slow down Sherman’s March to the Sea. In 1865, the Pee Dee Light Artillery continued as part of the Confederate forces under General Johnston. On April 26, 1865, General Johnston surrendered his forces. The battle flag of the Pee Dee Light Artillery was never surrendered. Instead, it was wrapped around the body of the battery guidon bearer, Private R.C. Nettles who returned to South Carolina. The battle flag remained in the hands of the members of the Pee Dee Light Artillery in the Darlington area until 1905, when it was turned over to the South Carolina Legislature by surviving veterans. The flag has recently been preserved and remains today in the South Carolina Confederate Relic Room and Military Museum in Columbia, South Carolina.

== See also ==
- List of South Carolina Confederate Civil War units
