= Young Lea Royston =

Confederate officer

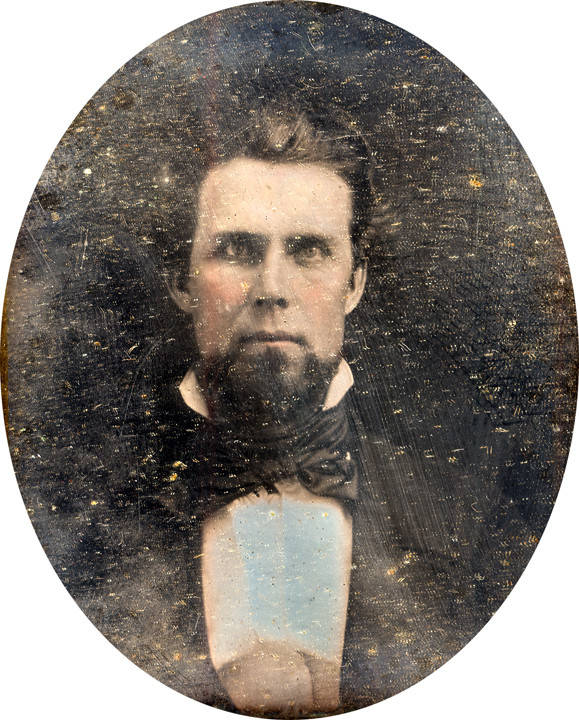
- Born: April 23, 1819; Perry County, Alabama, US
- Died: December 19, 1884 (aged 65); Selma, Alabama, US
- Military career
- Allegiance: Confederate States
- Branch: Confederate States Army
- Rank: Colonel
- Unit: 8th Alabama Infantry Regiment
- Battles: American Civil War; Battle of Williamsburg; Battle of Seven Pines; Battle of Gaines' Mill (WIA); Battle of Salem Church (WIA)

Young Lea Royston (1819 – 1884) was an officer, rising to the rank of colonel, in the Confederate States Army during the American Civil War.

== Early life ==
Young Lea Royston was a native of Perry county, Alabama. His parents came to the county from Georgia, and he was born on April 3, 1819. He was educated at the state University, and graduated with honors. Afterwards he read law and began his practice in Marion. In 1855 he became solicitor for the judicial circuit, and held the office for nine or ten years.

== Civil War ==
In the Civil War, he entered the military service of the Confederacy as captain of a company in the 8th Alabama Infantry Regiment, and soon rose to the rank of colonel. He was conspicuous for courage at Williamsburg, Seven Pines, Gaines' Mill and Salem Church, and was dangerously wounded in the two latter battles. The severity of his wounds severed his connection with the 8th, and he was for some time on post duty at Selma.

== Later life ==
After the war, he took little part in public affairs, but gave his attention to business, much of the time in Dallas. For several years prior to his death he had been engaged in the warehouse and cotton brokerage business in Selma. He died at his home in Selma on December 19, 1884, and was buried the following afternoon. In life, he was 6 ft 7½ (2.2 m) in stature and spare.

== Sources ==
- "Death of Col. Y. L. Royston". The Morning Times. December 20, 1884, p. 4.
- "The Late Col. Y. L. Royston". Montgomery Daily Advertiser. December 23, 1884. p. 2.
- "Two Good Men Gone". The Bibb Blade. December 24, 1884. p. 2.
