= 3rd Alabama Infantry Regiment =

Infantry regiment of the Confederate States Army

- Flag of Alabama in 1861 (obverse and reverse)
- Active: May 1861 to April 1865
- Disbanded: April 9, 1865
- Country: Confederate States of America
- Branch: Confederate States Army
- Type: Infantry
- Engagements: Battle of Seven Pines; Battle of Malvern Hill; Battle of Antietam; Battle of Fredericksburg; Battle of Chancellorsville; Battle of Gettysburg; Battle of Boonsboro; Battle of Mine Run; Battle of the Wilderness; Battle of Spottsylvania; Battle of Cold Harbor; Third Battle of Winchester; Siege of Petersburg

Commanders
- Notable commanders: Colonel Cullen A. Battle Captain Jeffrey Williamson

The 3rd Alabama Infantry Regiment was an infantry regiment that served in the Confederate Army during the American Civil War. The 3rd Alabama consisted mainly of men from the Alabama counties of Autauga, Coosa, Lowndes, Macon, Mobile and Montgomery.

== Service ==
The 3rd Alabama Infantry Regiment was mustered in at Montgomery, Alabama in April 1861 and fought in some of the Civil War's most bloody battles, including Seven Pines, Fredericksburg, Chancellorsville, Antietam, Gettysburg and The Wilderness. The unit was commanded by Tennent C. Lomax until he was killed in action at Seven Pines on June 1, 1862. By war's end the regiment would surrender at Appomattox Court House.

== Gettysburg ==
The 3rd Alabama mainly fought on the 1st day of battle on July 1, 1863, at the area of the battlefield known as Oak Ridge, specifically the Oak Hill portion of the ridge. There is a monument located on Oak Hill under the name O'Neal's Brigade, which honors the 3rd as well as the 5th, 6th, 12th and 26th infantry regiments.

== Total strength and casualties ==
The 3rd had at the beginning of the war 1,651 men on its roll. Of those men, 260 were killed in battle, 119 in service, and 605 were discharged or transferred. The regiment lost heavily at Chancellorsville and Gettysburg.

== See also ==
- List of Confederate units from Alabama
