= 15th Virginia Cavalry Regiment =

- Flag of Virginia, 1861
- Active: May 1862 – April 1865
- Disbanded: April 1865
- Country: Confederacy
- Allegiance: Confederate States of America
- Branch: Confederate States Army
- Type: Cavalry
- Engagements: American Civil War: Seven Days' Battles; Second Battle of Bull Run; Battle of Antietam; Battle of Fredericksburg; Battle of Chancellorsville; Battle of Brandy Station; Battle of Gettysburg; Bristoe Campaign; Overland Campaign; Siege of Petersburg; Valley Campaigns of 1864; Appomattox Campaign

The 15th Virginia Volunteer Cavalry Regiment was a cavalry regiment raised in Virginia for service in the Confederate States Army during the American Civil War. It fought mostly with the Army of Northern Virginia.

Virginia's 15th Cavalry Regiment was formed in September 1862, by consolidating the 14th and 15th Battalions, Virginia Cavalry. The 14th Battalion, Virginia Cavalry (also called the Chesapeake Battalion) was organized in May 1862, with four companies. It included three companies from the 5th Regiment Virginia Cavalry in the Provisional Confederate Army. The unit served under General Daniel at Malvern Hill, then was assigned to Robert Ransom's Brigade. Major Edgar Burroughs was in command when it was consolidated. The 15th Battalion, Virginia Cavalry (also called the Northern Neck Rangers) was also organized during the spring of 1862 with four companies. Attached to the Army of Northern Virginia, the unit served under J.E.B. Stuart. Major John Critcher was in command when it was consolidated.

The consolidated unit served in W.H.F. Lee's, Lomax's, and Payne's Brigade, Army of Northern Virginia. It was active in the Chancellorsville Campaign and later reported 2 killed and 14 wounded during the operations around Bristoe. The regiment continued the fight at Mine Run and The Wilderness, then saw action about Cold Harbor.

It moved with Early to the Shenandoah Valley and on November 8, 1864, was absorbed by the 5th Virginia Cavalry. The field officers were Colonels William B. Ball and Charles R. Collins, Lieutenant Colonel John Critcher, and Major Edgar Burroughs.

== See also ==
- List of Virginia Civil War units
