= 34th Virginia Infantry Regiment =

- Flag of Virginia, 1861
- Active: May 1862 – April 1865
- Disbanded: April 1865
- Country: Confederacy
- Allegiance: Confederate States of America
- Branch: Confederate States Army
- Type: Infantry
- Engagements: American Civil War: Siege of Petersburg; Battle of Sayler's Creek; Appomattox Campaign

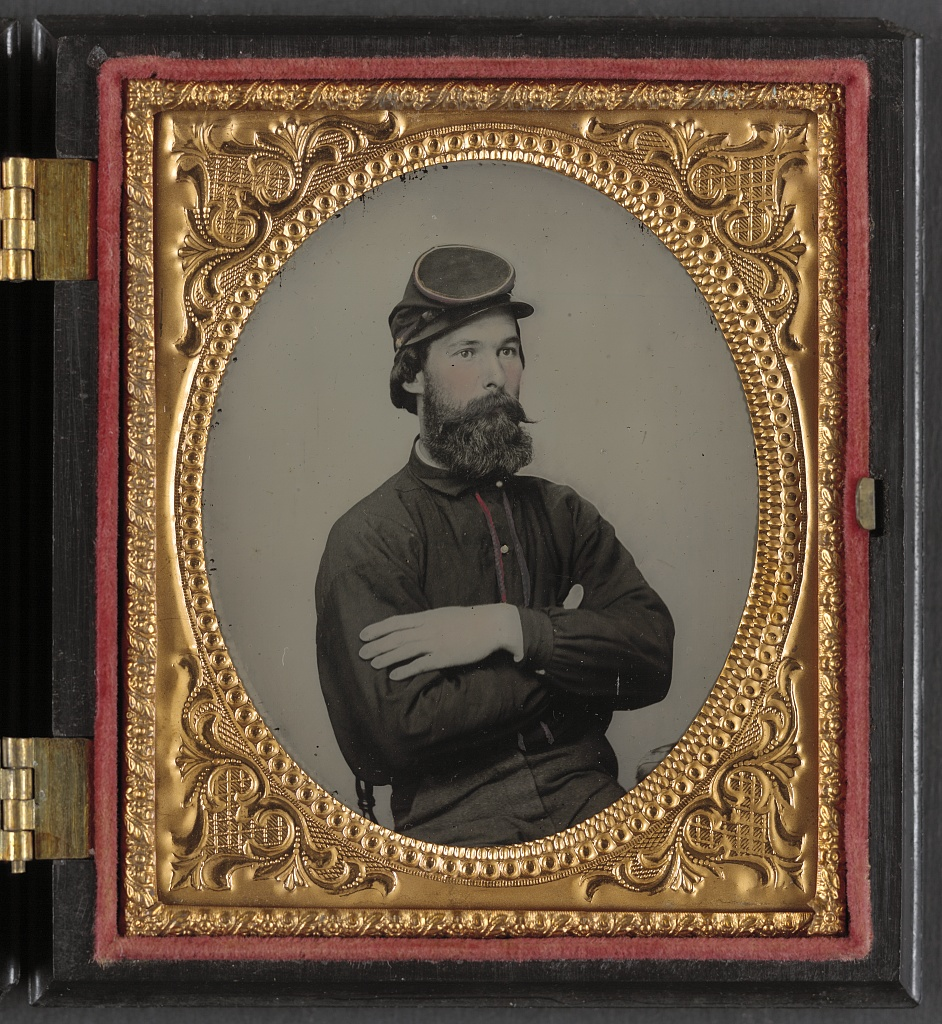
Private Tomley(?) Lumpkin of 34th Virginia Infantry Regiment

The 34th Virginia Infantry Regiment was an infantry regiment raised in Virginia for service in the Confederate States Army during the American Civil War. It fought mostly with the Army of Northern Virginia.

The 34th Virginia was organized in May 1862, with men from Norfolk, Richmond, and Yorktown, and the counties of Gloucester, Mecklenburg, Bedford, Greene, and King and Queen. For almost two years the unit served as heavy artillery attached to the Department of Richmond and was known as the 4th Heavy Artillery.

In May, 1864, it was assigned to Wise's Brigade as infantry. It participated in the long Petersburg siege south of the James River, and saw action in various conflicts around Appomattox.

It contained 466 effectives in June, 1862, and surrendered 14 officers and 210 men.

The field officers were Colonel John T. Goode, Lieutenant Colonel Randolph Harrison, and Major John R. Bagby.

== See also ==
- List of Virginia Civil War units
