= James B. Walton =

Confederate Army officer (1813–1885)

James Burdge Walton
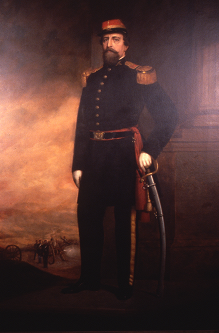
- Born: c. 1813; New Jersey, United States
- Died: 1885 (aged 71–72); New Orleans
- Military career
- Allegiance: United States of America; Confederate States of America
- Branch: United States Army (Militia); Confederate States Army
- Service years: 1839–61 (USA); 1861–64 (CSA)
- Rank: Colonel; Colonel
- Unit: Washington Artillery
- Conflicts: Mexican–American War; American Civil War

James Burdge Walton (c. 1813–1885) was a Confederate military officer who was recognized for serving in the famed Washington Artillery for two decades. He was most prominent in the Confederate service in the American Civil War as commander of the Washington Artillery out of New Orleans and as Inspector-General of Field Artillery of the Confederate States, the highest position an artillery officer could achieve.

== Early life ==
Born in New Jersey, Walton attended college in Louisiana and owned a New Orleans grocery store.

== Military service ==
=== Mexican American War ===
Walton joined the Washington Artillery as an adjutant when the unit was formed in 1839. In the Mexican War, Walton commanded the 1st Louisiana Artillery as a Major and by 1857 he was Colonel Commanding of the battalion.

=== Civil War ===
At the outbreak of the Civil War, Walton and four of five batteries went East to serve in Virginia. After fighting at the First Battle of Manassas, Walton and his command were assigned to James Longstreet's forces. These batteries served in the Peninsula Campaign, at Second Manassas, and Antietam. Walton commanded the batteries on Marye's Heights during the Battle of Fredericksburg and the Chancellorsville Campaign. He commanded the artillery reserve of the First Corps artillery and was offended when at Gettysburg a subordinate Colonel E. Porter Alexander was placed in charge of the artillery preparation for Pickett's Charge on July 3, 1863.

When the bulk of Longstreet's First Corps were sent to Georgia, only a portion of the artillery was sent with it. Walton held several positions in southern Virginia during the absence of his guns. Walton worked to improve artillery formations and drills, it was during this time that he rose to the rank of Colonel after an act was passed through the congress of the Confederacy, making him the highest ranking artillery officer in the Confederacy. A prominent accomplishment of his was the design for the Hanging Tigers Head used as a badge by the Washington Artillery. He resigned on July 18, 1864 and returned to his business as a merchant.

== Family life ==
Walton's son, James B. Jr., was a student at Virginia Military Institute class of 1865 who resigned to join the Confederacy in 1861.
