= James D. Nance =

Confederate colonel (1837–1864)

James Drayton Nance
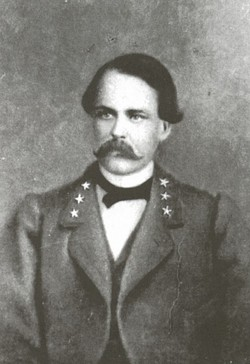
- Born: October 10, 1837; Newberry, South Carolina, U.S.
- Died: May 6, 1864 (aged 26); Chancellorsville, Virginia, U.S.
- Burial place: Rosemont Cemetery, Newberry, South Carolina, U.S.
- Military career
- Allegiance: Confederate States
- Branch: Confederate States Army
- Service years: 1861–1864
- Rank: Colonel
- Commands: Quitman Rifles; 3rd South Carolina Infantry Regiment
- Battles: List: American Civil War; Battle of Seven Pines; Battle of Savage's Station; Battle of Malvern Hill; Battle of Harpers Ferry; Battle of Antietam; Battle of Fredericksburg (WIA); Battle of Gettysburg; Battle of Chickamauga; Battle of the Wilderness †

James Drayton Nance (1837-1864) was a Confederate Colonel of the American Civil War. He was known for commanding the 3rd South Carolina Infantry Regiment throughout the war, primarily serving in the Peninsula campaign, the Maryland campaign and the Gettysburg campaign but was killed at the Battle of the Wilderness.

== Early life ==
Nance was born on October 10, 1837, at Newberry, South Carolina, as the son of Drayton and Lucy (née Williams) Nance. His maternal great grandfather, James Williams was a commander of the Battle of Kings Mountain and was killed in the battle. During his childhood, Nance was attributed as being extremely truthful and obedient to anyone in a higher authority. Despite this however, he wasn't a pushover as he frequently asserted his rights among his classmates and manifested a spirit of justice and fairness.

Before the American Civil War, he graduated from the Citadel Military Academy of Charleston and was practicing law in 1859. Around the same time, Nance was elected to be the Captain of the Quitman Rifles which was a military formation originating from Newberry. He was also a practicing Baptist Christian, joining since the age of 17.

== American Civil War ==
After the American Civil War broke out, Nance enlisted as the Captain of Company E within the 3rd South Carolina Infantry Regiment on April 14, 1861, as the Quitman Rifles was incorporated within the Regiment and briefly saw service at the First Battle of Bull Run. He was promoted to Colonel on May 16, 1862. During his service within Joseph B. Kershaw's brigade, he was described as a thorough tactician and disciplinarian, notably earning the respect from General James Conner.

Nance saw his first notable action at the Peninsula campaign, taking part in the battles of Seven Pines, Savage's Station and Malvern Hill. He was then transferred over to the Maryland campaign to participate in the Battle of Harpers Ferry and later at the bigger Battle of Antietam. After getting wounded at the Battle of Fredericksburg, he later returned to participate at the Battle of Gettysburg and the Battle of Chickamauga. During the war, Nance was described as being "dauntless but discreet, buoyant and hopeful, yet fully alive to the stern duties of life: with a clear head and great self-possession, he was in every way reliable." Nance was killed during the Battle of the Wilderness as William D. Rutherford reported by telegram "that Col. Nance fell in battle today - - pierced by five balls." At the time of his death, his superior officers were already prepared for his promotion to Brigadier general.
