= Joseph A. Walker (colonel) =

American Civil War officer (1835–1902)

Joseph Allen Walker
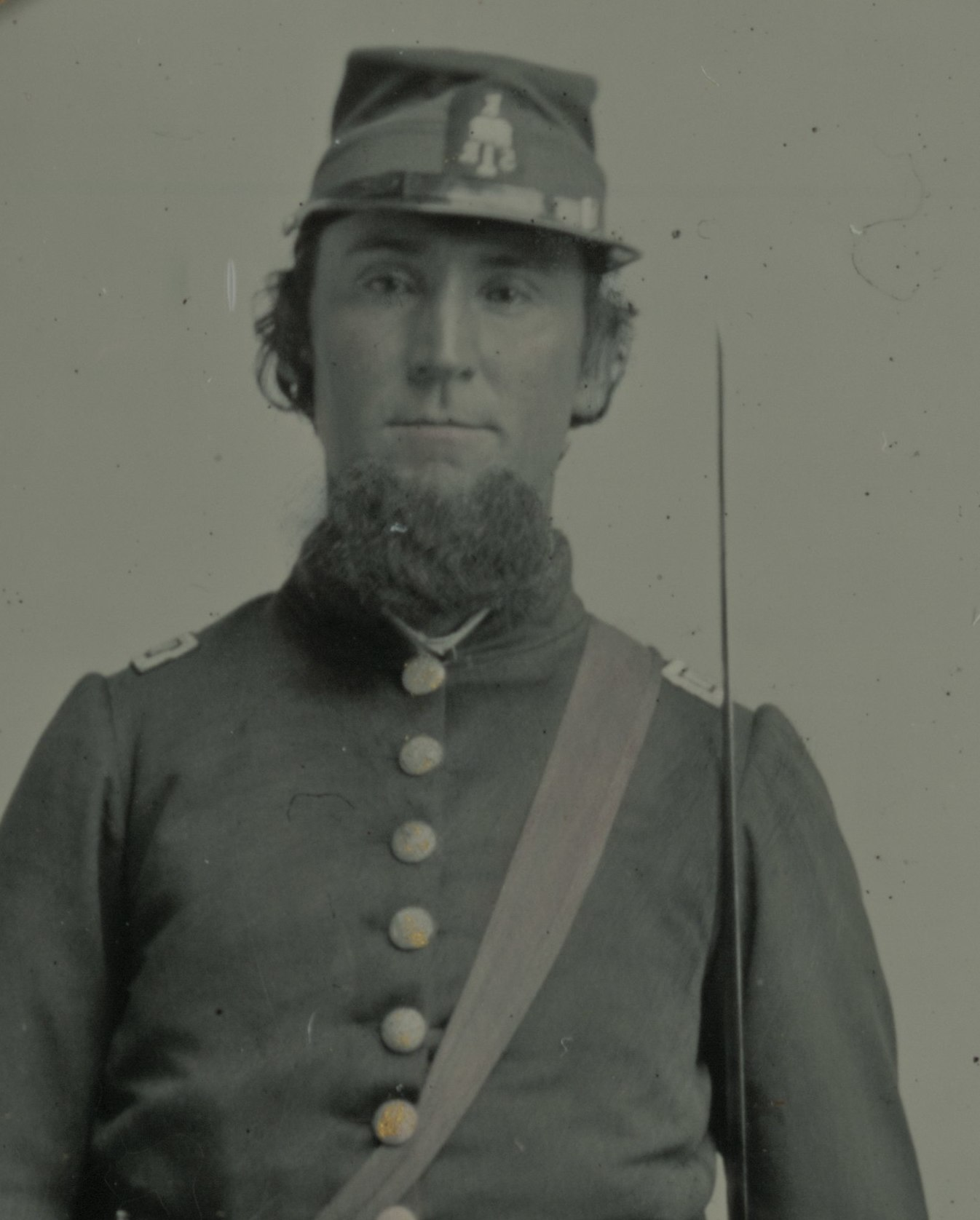
- Born: May 18, 1835; Spartanburg, South Carolina, U.S.
- Died: January 27, 1902 (aged 66); Spartanburg, South Carolina, U.S.
- Burial place: Oakwood Cemetery, Spartanburg, South Carolina
- Military career
- Allegiance: Confederate States
- Branch: Confederate States Army
- Service years: 1861–1865
- Rank: Colonel
- Commands: 5th South Carolina Infantry Regiment
- Conflicts: American Civil War: Maryland campaign; Battle of South Mountain; Battle of Antietam

Joseph Allen Walker (May 18, 1835 – January 27, 1902) was a Confederate colonel who commanded the 5th South Carolina Infantry Regiment and the main colonel of Jenkins' Brigade of the Army of Northern Virginia during the American Civil War.

== Biography ==
=== Origin ===
Joseph was born on May 18, 1835, at Spartanburg, South Carolina. His prewar life consisted of being a clerk and a merchant as well as marrying Susan Elizabeth Walker at one point. A few months before the outbreak of the American Civil War, Walker raised the Spartan Rifles at Spartanburg and was elected captain of the rifles.

=== American Civil War ===
When the American Civil War broke out, the Spartan Rifles were integrated into the 5th South Carolina Infantry Regiment as Company K on April 13, 1861, and Walker would command the company for a year until he was transferred to the Palmetto Sharpshooters where he would be a lieutenant colonel on April 15, 1862. He was then fully promoted to colonel on July 22 of the same year. Walker was then a part of Robert E. Lee's Army of the Potomac as the main colonel of Micah Jenkins' brigade. Walker would then serve at the Battle of South Mountain and the Battle of Antietam. Parham would then serve as a state representative of South Carolina in 1864 before surrendering around the end of the American Civil War.

=== Post-War Life ===
After the war, Walker returned to becoming a merchant until 1875. He would then be in the cotton and fertilizer trade until 1885. After that, he reorganized the Merchants and Farmers Bank and became president of the bank. He would also be Mayor of Spartanburg for around 10 years. Walker died on January 27, 1902, and would be buried on Oakwood Cemetery at Spartanburg.

James L. Kemper considered Walker to be a "A capital soldier, a good disciplinarian, and peculiarly adapted to command our citizen soldiers."
