= 22nd Virginia Infantry Battalion =

22nd Battalion, Virginia Infantry Regulars
- Flag of Virginia, 1861
- Active: Summer 1861 – April 1865
- Disbanded: December 22, 1864
- Country: Confederacy
- Allegiance: Confederate States of America
- Branch: Confederate States Army
- Type: Infantry
- Engagements: American Civil War: Battle of Cedar Mountain; Second Battle of Bull Run; Battle of Antietam; Battle of Fredericksburg; Battle of Chancellorsville; Battle of Gettysburg; Overland Campaign; Siege of Petersburg

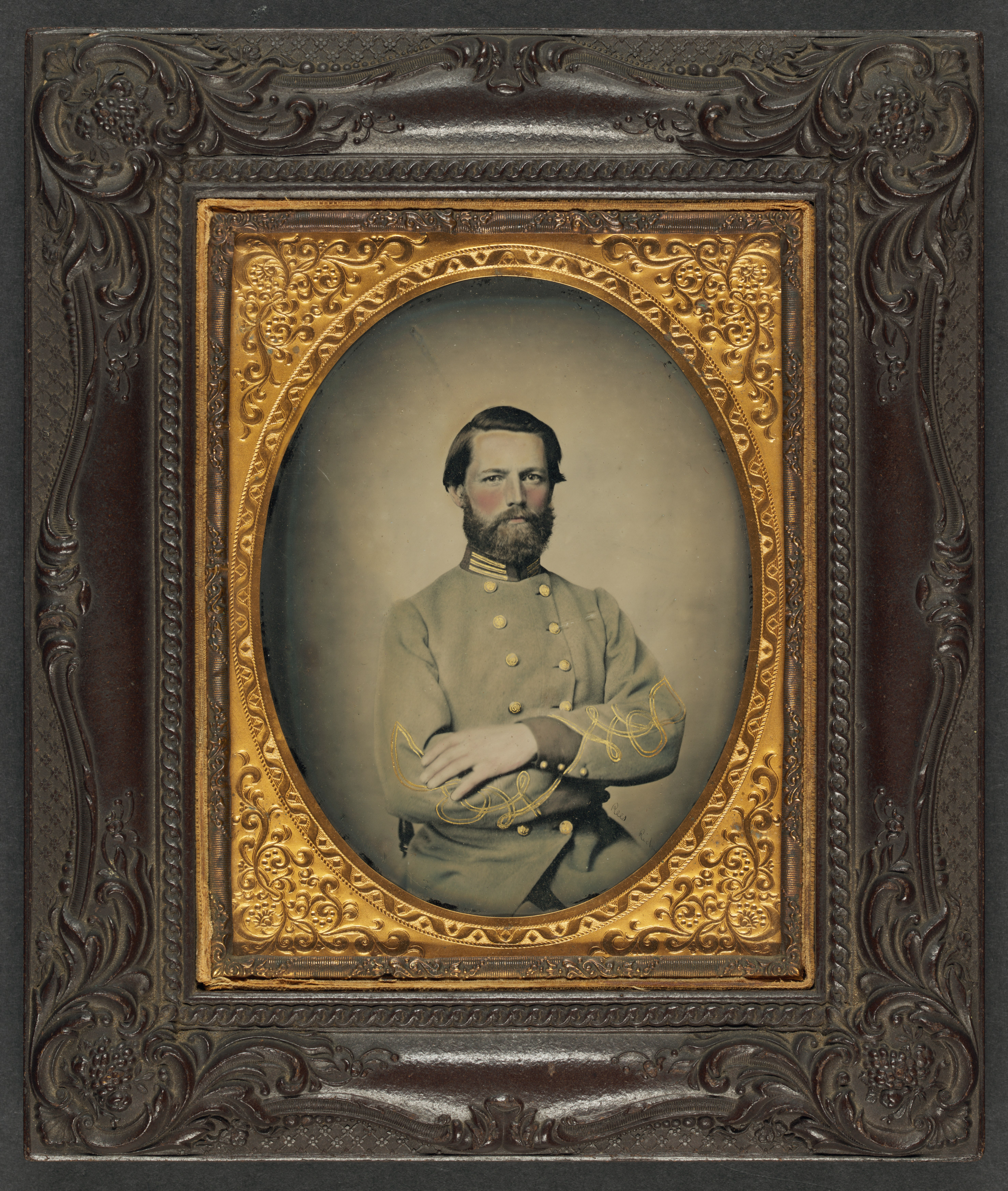
Captain William W. Cosby of H Company, 2nd Virginia Light Artillery Regiment

The 22nd Battalion, Virginia Infantry Regulars was raised in Virginia for service in the Confederate States Army during the American Civil War and, served as infantry. It fought mostly with the Army of Northern Virginia.

22nd Infantry Battalion was organized with six companies of the 2nd Regiment, Virginia Artillery. Converted to an Infantry Battalion in May 1862. It served in Field's, Heth's, and H.H. Walker's Brigade, and fought with the Army of Northern Virginia from Cedar Mountain to Cold Harbor, then was involved in the Petersburg siege south of the James River.

On December 22, 1864, the battalion was ordered to disband and its members distributed among other Virginia commands. The order was not carried out and most of the battalion was captured at Saylors Creek on April 6, 1865 as part Barton's Brigade, G. W. C. Lee's Division, Department of Richmond (Ewell's Corps), while the remaining 13 men, all privates, surrendered and received their paroles at Appomattox on April 9.

It reported 7 casualties at Cedar Mountain, 22 at Second Manassas, 27 at Fredericksburg, and 29 at Chancellorsville. Ten percent of the 237 engaged at Gettysburg were disabled.

The field officers were Lieutenant Colonels James C. Johnson and Edward P. Tayloe, and Major John S. Bowles.

== See also ==
- List of Virginia Civil War units
