= 7th North Carolina Infantry Regiment =

Infantry regiment of the Confederate States Army

- Active: August 1861 – April 26, 1865
- Disbanded: April 26, 1865
- Country: Confederate States
- Allegiance: Confederate States Army
- Branch: Infantry
- Engagements: American Civil War

The 7th North Carolina Infantry was an infantry regiment that served in the Confederate States Army during the American Civil War.

== History ==
The regiment was mustered into the army at Camp Mason in Alamance County, North Carolina in August 1861. Its companies were raised in Iredell, Alexander, Cabarrus, Rowan, New Hanover, Mecklenburg, Nash, and Wake counties. It initially served in garrison duties in North Carolina, where it fought in its first engagement at the Battle of New Bern on March 14, 1862. The regiment then transferred to the Army of Northern Virginia, where it became part of A. P. Hill's Light Division. It fought with the Army of Northern Virginia throughout the war until February 1865, when it was transferred back to North Carolina. It surrendered as part of D.H. Hill's division at the Bennett Place on 26 April 1865.

== See also ==
- List of North Carolina Confederate Civil War units

== Sources ==
- National Park Service
- Reenactor group of Company F
