= 9th Georgia Infantry Regiment =

Infantry regiment of the Confederate States Army

- Unofficial Georgia flag prior to 1879
- Active: June, 1861–1865
- Country: Confederate States of America
- Allegiance: Georgia
- Branch: Confederate States Army
- Type: Infantry
- Engagements: American Civil War * Antietam * Gettysburg * Siege of Knoxville * Wilderness Campaign

The 9th Georgia Infantry Regiment was an infantry regiment in the Confederate States Army during the American Civil War.

== History ==
The 9th Georgia Volunteer Infantry formed in June 1861 and contained men from around the State of Georgia. The regiment fought at Gettysburg, Siege of Knoxville, and participated in the Wilderness Campaign while serving under General James Longstreet. For their actions at Gettysburg, they received the Confederate Roll of Honor. Aside from a brief stint in the Army of Tennessee, the 9th spent most of its time during the war with Longstreet in the Army of Northern Virginia and ended their service with that corps. Future Atlanta mayor, George Hillyer served with the 9th and wrote a book about their action at Gettysburg entitled My Gettysburg Battle Experiences.

=== Companies of the 9th Georgia Volunteer Infantry ===
1. A - Wilkes County, Ga. (The "Irvin Guards")
2. B - Chattooga County, Ga. (The "Chattooga Volunteers")
3. C - Walton County, Ga. (The "Hillyer Rifles")
4. D - Clay County, Ga. (The "Fort Gaines Guards")
5. E - Talbot County, Ga. (The "Talbot Guards")
6. F - Baldwin County, Ga. (The "Baldwin County Volunteers")
7. G - Walker County, Ga. (The "Lafayette Volunteers")
8. H - Brooks County, Ga. (The "Brooks County Rifles")
9. I - Bulloch County, Ga. (The "Toombs Guards")
10. K - Sumter County, Ga. (The "Americus Volunteer Rifles")

== See also ==
- List of Civil War regiments from Georgia
