= 56th Virginia Infantry Regiment =

- Flag of Virginia, 1861
- Active: September 1861 – April 1865
- Disbanded: April 1865
- Country: Confederacy
- Allegiance: Confederate States of America
- Branch: Confederate States Army
- Type: Infantry
- Engagements: Battle of Fort Donelson; Peninsula Campaign; Seven Days' Battles; Second Battle of Bull Run; Battle of Antietam; Battle of Fredericksburg; Siege of Suffolk; Battle of Gettysburg; Overland Campaign; Siege of Petersburg; Battle of Five Forks; Battle of Sailor's Creek; Appomattox Campaign

The 56th Virginia Infantry Regiment was an infantry regiment raised in Virginia for service in the Confederate States Army during the American Civil War. It fought mostly with the Army of Northern Virginia.

The 56th Virginia completed its organization in September 1861, with men from Louisa, Mecklenburg, Buckingham, Nelson and Charlotte counties. It moved to Tennessee and was attached to Floyd's Brigade, and was captured in the fight at Fort Donelson. After being exchanged, the unit returned to Virginia and was assigned to Pickett's, Garnett's, and Hunton's Brigade, Army of Northern Virginia.

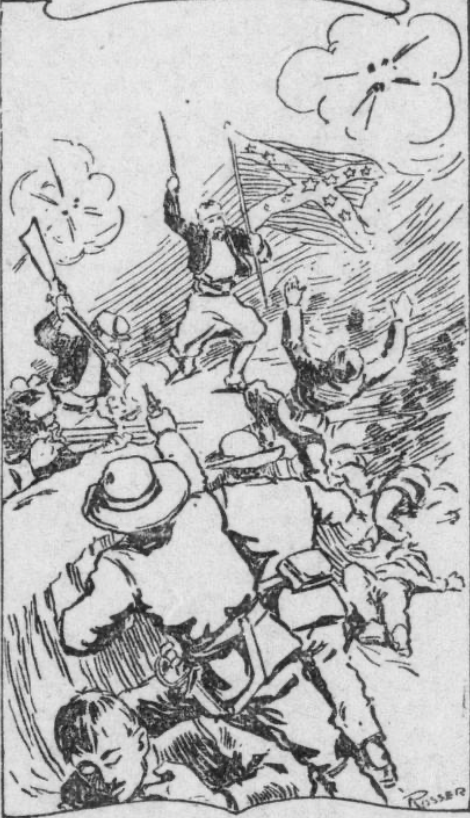
Illustration of the regimental flag being captured by the 11th New York Infantry

It fought with the army from the Seven Days' Battles in 1862 to Cold Harbor in 1864, except when it served under Lt. Gen. James Longstreet at Suffolk. The 56th then endured the hardships of the Petersburg trenches north and south of the James River and saw action around Appomattox.

In June 1862, it contained 466 effectives and reported 100 casualties during the Seven Days' Battles. This regiment carried only 40 men into action at Sharpsburg and eight were wounded. Of the 289 engaged at Gettysburg, more than 65 percent were disabled. Many were captured at Sayler's Creek, and only three officers and 26 men surrendered on April 9, 1865.

The field officers were Colonels William E. Green, Philip P. Slaughter and William D. Stuart; Lieutenant Colonel Timoleon Smith; and Major John B. McPhail.

== See also ==
- List of Virginia Civil War units
