= 1st Virginia Infantry Battalion =

Confederate States Army unit

1st Battalion, Virginia Volunteer Infantry
- Flag of Virginia, 1861
- Active: May 1861 – April 1865
- Disbanded: April 1865
- Country: Confederacy
- Allegiance: Confederate States of America
- Branch: Confederate States Army
- Role: Infantry
- Nickname: Irish Battalion
- Engagements: American Civil War: Battle of Cheat Mountain; Jackson's Valley Campaign; Seven Days' Battles; Second Battle of Bull Run; Battle of Antietam; Battle of Fredericksburg

The 1st Battalion, Virginia Infantry Regulars, also known as the Irish Battalion, was raised in Virginia for service in the Confederate States Army during the American Civil War and, served as infantry. It fought mostly with the Army of Northern Virginia.

The battalion was organized in May 1861, with men from the city of Richmond and Hanover County in five companies. It moved to western Virginia and participated in Lee's Cheat Mountain Campaign, then fought at First Kernstown, McDowell, and in Jackson's Valley Campaign. The unit was then assigned to General J.R. Jones' Brigade and was involved in many conflicts of the Army of Northern Virginia from the Seven Day's Battles to Fredericksburg. Later it was assigned to General Headquarters and in November 1864, Provost Guard.

It lost twenty-five percent of the 187 engaged at First Kernstown, had 3 wounded during the Seven Days' Battles and 3 killed and 19 wounded at Second Manassas. The unit surrendered 18 officers and 120 men.

Majors D.B. Bridgford, John D. Munford, and John Seddon were in command.

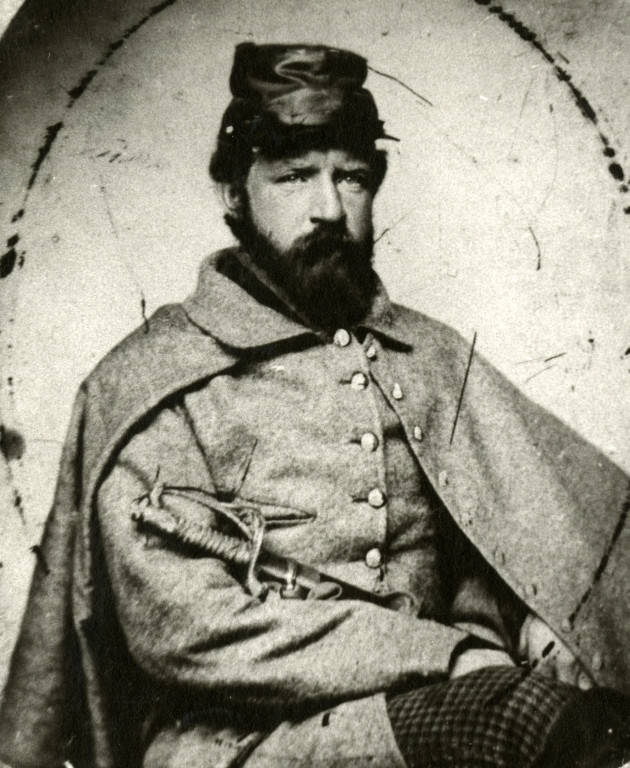
Capt. George Baylor Horner, 1st Virginia Battalion

== See also ==
- List of Virginia Civil War units
