= 14th Virginia Infantry Regiment =

- Flag of Virginia, 1861
- Active: May 1861 – Spring 1865
- Disbanded: April 1865
- Country: Confederacy
- Allegiance: Confederate States of America
- Branch: Confederate States Army
- Type: Infantry
- Engagements: Seven Days' Battles; Second Battle of Manassas; Sharpsburg; Battle of Fredericksburg; Battle of Gettysburg; Battle of Proctor's Creek; Siege of Petersburg; Battle of Five Forks; Battle of Sailor's Creek

The 14th Virginia Infantry Regiment was an infantry regiment raised in Virginia for service in the Confederate States Army during the American Civil War. It fought mostly with the Army of Northern Virginia.

14th Virginia was organized in May 1861, and entered the Confederate service at Richmond in July. Its companies were recruited in the counties of Amelia, Bedford, Fluvanna, Chesterfield, Halifax, and Mecklenburg.

The regiment was brigaded under Generals Armistead, Barton, and Steuart. It fought with the Army of Northern Virginia from Seven Pines to Gettysburg, served in North Carolina, then saw action in Drewry's Bluff. The 14th participated in the long Petersburg siege north of the James River and ended the war at Appomattox.

In June, 1862, it contained 449 men. It reported 12 killed, 57 wounded, and 6 missing at Malvern Hill, and 7 wounded during the Maryland Campaign. Of the 422 engaged at Gettysburg, more than twenty-five percent were disabled. The regiment sustained 71 casualties at Drewry's Bluff and lost many at Five Forks and Sayler's Creek. Only 7 officers and 49 men surrendered on April 9, 1865.

The field officers were Colonels James G. Hodges and William White; Lieutenant Colonels Moses F.T. Evans, David J. Godwin, Parke Poindexter, and William W. Wood; and Majors Robert H. Poore and William D. Shelton.

== See also ==
- List of Virginia Civil War units
