= 14th Alabama Infantry Regiment =

Infantry regiment of the Confederate States Army

- Flag of Alabama in 1861 (obverse and reverse)
- Active: August 1, 1861, to April 1865
- Country: Confederate States of America
- Branch: Confederate States Army
- Type: Infantry
- Engagements: Battle of Glendale; Battle of Mechanicsville; Battle of Malvern Hill; Second Battle of Bull Run; Battle of Antietam; Battle of Fredericksburg; Battle of Gettysburg; Siege of Petersburg

The 14th Alabama Infantry Regiment was an infantry regiment that served in the Confederate Army during the American Civil War.

== Service ==
The 14th Alabama Infantry Regiment was mustered in at Richmond, Virginia, on August 1, 1861.

During one of the first battles that the 14th fought in, at Glendale, the unit was sent in as a vanguard against Union positions and suffered considerable casualties.

The regiment surrendered at Appomattox Court House.

== Total strength and casualties ==
The 14th mustered 1,317 men during its existence. It suffered approximately 250 killed in action or mortally wounded and 350 men who died of disease, for a total of approximately 600 fatalities. An additional 159 men were discharged or transferred from the regiment.

== Commanders ==
- Colonel Thomas J. Judge
- Colonel Alfred Campbell Wood
- Colonel Lucius Pinkard

== See also ==
- List of Confederate units from Alabama
