= 5th Virginia Cavalry Regiment =

Confederate States Army unit

5th Virginia Cavalry Regiment 5th Virginia Consolidated Cavalry Regiment
- Flag of Virginia, 1861
- Active: June 1862 – April 1865
- Disbanded: April 1865
- Country: Confederacy
- Allegiance: Confederate States of America
- Branch: Confederate States Army
- Role: Cavalry
- Engagements: First Battle of Manassas; Peninsula Campaign; Seven Days' Battles; Second Battle of Bull Run; Battle of Antietam; Battle of Fredericksburg; Battle of Chancellorsville; Battle of Brandy Station; Battle of Gettysburg; Bristoe Campaign; Overland Campaign; Siege of Petersburg; Valley Campaigns of 1864; Battle of Five Forks; Appomattox Campaign

Commanders
- Notable commanders: Colonel Thomas L. Rosser

The 5th Virginia Cavalry Regiment was a cavalry regiment raised in Virginia for service in the Confederate States Army during the American Civil War. It fought mostly with the Army of Northern Virginia.

The Virginia 5th Cavalry was organized in June, 1862, using six companies of scouts under Lieutenant Colonel H. Clay Pate known as the 2nd Battalion Virginia Cavalry as its nucleus. These men who had been serving since May and the additional four companies added in June were from Petersburg and Fairfax, Gloucester (Co. F, the Mathews Light Dragoons), King and Queen, Mathews, Randolph, and James City counties.

It was assigned to W.H.F. Lee's, F. Lee's, Lomax's, and Payne's Brigade, Army of Northern Virginia. The unit participated in the Seven Days' Battles, the Second Bull Run and Maryland campaigns, and the conflicts at Fredericksburg, Brandy Station, Upperville, Gettysburg, Bristoe, and Mine Run. Later it was involved at The Wilderness and Cold Harbor, and in Early's Shenandoah Valley operations.

On November 8, 1864, it was consolidated with the 15th Virginia Cavalry and redesignated the 5th Consolidated Regiment Virginia Cavalry. This command took part in the defense of Petersburg and saw action around Appomattox.

Only 150 men were engaged at Gettysburg and 2 surrendered at Appomattox as most cut through the Federal lines and disbanded. The field officers were Colonels Reuben B. Boston, H. Clay Pate, and Thomas L. Rosser; Lieutenant Colonel James H. Allen; and Majors Beverly B. Douglas, John Eells, Cyrus Harding, Jr., and John W. Puller.

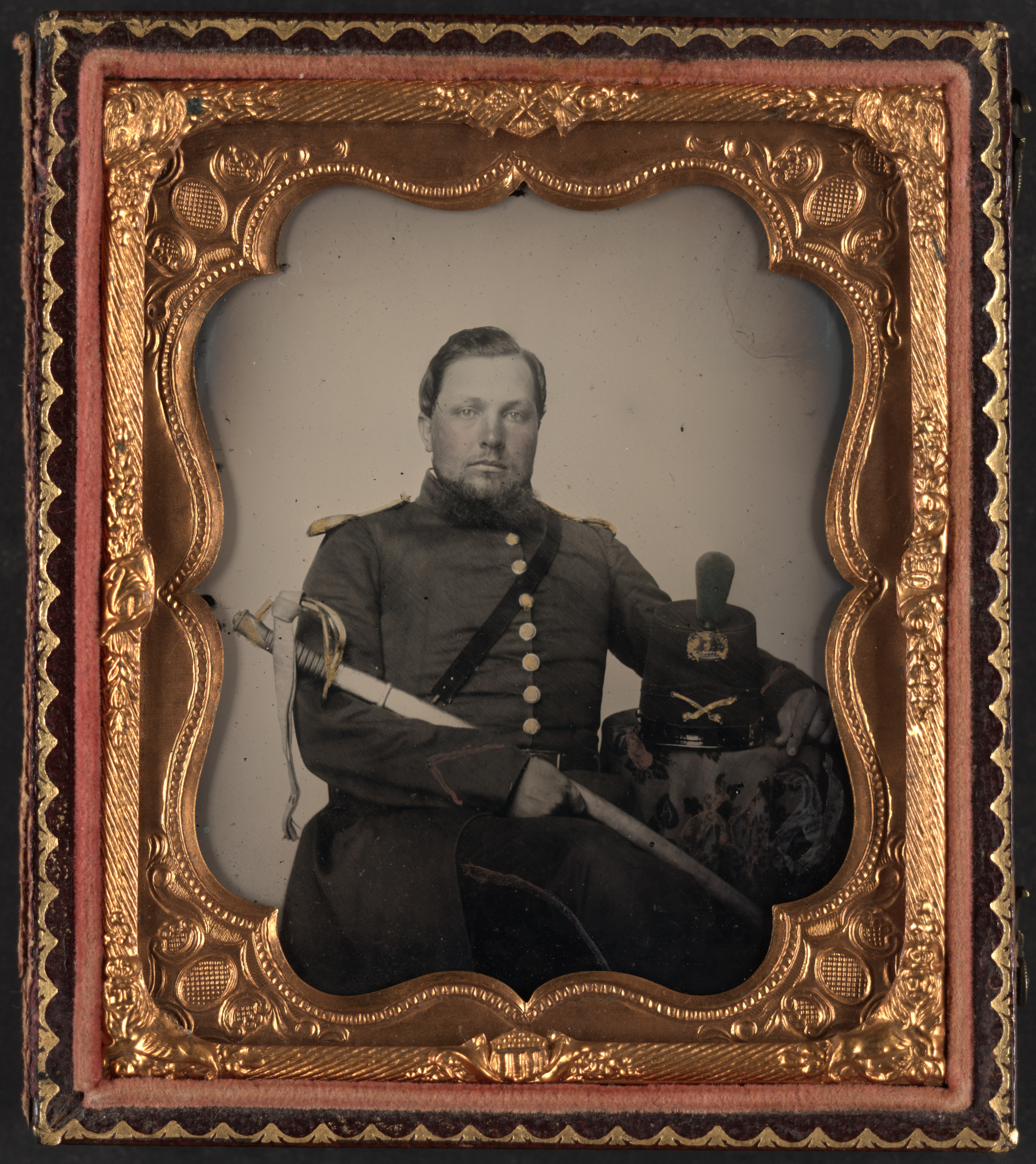
Captain Robert Emmet Robinson of Petersburg Light Dragoons, later assigned to Co. D, 5th Virginia Cavalry Regiment, in uniform with Virginia state seal swordbelt plate and sword

== See also ==
- List of Virginia Civil War units
