= 30th Virginia Infantry Regiment =

- Flag of Virginia, 1861
- Active: June 1861 – April 1865
- Disbanded: April 1865
- Country: Confederacy
- Allegiance: Confederate States of America
- Branch: Confederate States Army
- Type: Infantry
- Engagements: Seven Days' Battles; Second Battle of Bull Run; Battle of Antietam; Battle of Fredericksburg; Siege of Suffolk; Siege of Petersburg; Battle of Five Forks; Battle of Sailor's Creek; Appomattox Campaign

Major Robert Olin Peatross of Co. E, 30th Virginia Infantry Regiment

The 30th Virginia Infantry Regiment was an infantry regiment raised in Virginia for service in the Confederate States Army during the American Civil War. It fought mostly in western Virginia, Kentucky, North Carolina, and Virginia.

The 30th Virginia completed its organization at Fredericksburg, Virginia, in June 1861. Men of this unit were from Fredericksburg and the counties of Spotsylvania, Caroline, Stafford, and King George.

It was assigned to General J.G. Walker's and Corse's Brigade and fought with the Army of Northern Virginia from the Seven Days' Battles to Fredericksburg. After serving with Longstreet at Suffolk, it was on detached duty in Tennessee and North Carolina. During the spring of 1864, the 30th returned to Virginia and saw action at Drewry's Bluff and Cold Harbor. Later, it endured the hardships of the Petersburg trenches north and south of the James River and ended the war at Appomattox.

It reported one killed and four wounded at Malvern Hill and 39 killed and 121 wounded in the Maryland Campaign. Many were lost at Five Forks and Sayler's Creek, and on April 9, 1865, it surrendered with eight officers and 82 men.

The field officers were Colonels R.M. Cary and Robert S. Chew, Lieutenant Colonels John M. Gouldin and Archibald T. Harrison, and Majors William S. Barton and Robert O. Peatross.

== See also ==
- List of Virginia Civil War units
