= Battle of Cross Keys order of battle: Union =

The following United States Army units and commanders fought in the Battle of Cross Keys of the American Civil War. The Confederate order of battle is listed separately.

== Abbreviations used ==
=== Military rank ===
- MG = Major General
- BG = Brigadier General
- Col = Colonel
- Ltc = Lieutenant Colonel
- Maj = Major
- Cpt = Captain

== Union Forces Near Cross Keys ==
MG John C. Frémont

=== Mountain Department ===
MG John C. Frémont

Division	Brigade	Regiment or other
Blenker's Division; BG Louis Blenker	First (Stahel's) Brigade BG Julius Stahel	8th New York: Col Francis Wutschel; 39th New York: 41st New York: Col Leopold von Gilsa; 45th New York: Col George von Amsberg; 27th Pennsylvania: Col Adolphus Buschbeck; 2nd Battery, New York Light Artillery: Cpt Louis Schirmer; Battery C, West Virginia Light Artillery: Cpt Frank Buel; Howitzer battery:
Blenker's Division; BG Louis Blenker	Second (Steinwehr's) Brigade Col John A. Koltes	29th New York Infantry: Ltc Clemens Soest; 68th New York Infantry: 73rd Pennsylvania: Ltc Gustavus A. Muhleck; 13th Battery, New York Light Artillery: Cpt Julius Dieckmann
Blenker's Division; BG Louis Blenker	Third (Bohlen's) Brigade BG Henry Bohlen	54th New York: Col Eugene A. Kozlay; 58th New York: Col Włodzimierz Krzyżanowski; 74th Pennsylvania: Ltc John Hamm; 75th Pennsylvania: Ltc Francis Mahler; Battery I, 1st New York Light Artillery: Cpt Michael Wiedrich
Blenker's Division; BG Louis Blenker	Cavalry Attachment Col Christian F. Dickel	4th New York Cavalry: Col Christian F. Dickel
Attached Independent Units	Cluseret's Brigade Col Gustave Paul Cluseret	8th West Virginia: Maj John H. Oley; 60th Ohio: Col William H. Trimble
Attached Independent Units	Milroy's Brigade BG Robert H. Milroy	2nd West Virginia: Maj James D. Owens; 3rd West Virginia: Ltc F. W. Thompson; 5th West Virginia: Col John L. Ziegler; 25th Ohio: Ltc William P. Richardson; 1st West Virginia Cavalry (detachment): Maj John A. Krepps; Battery G, West Virginia Light Artillery: Cpt Chatham T. Ewing; Battery I, 1st Ohio Light Artillery: Cpt Henry F. Hayman; 12th Battery, Ohio Light Artillery: Cpt Aaron C. Johnson
Attached Independent Units	Schenck's Brigade BG Robert C. Schenck	32nd Ohio: Ltc Ebenezer H. Swinney; 55th Ohio: Col John C. Lee; 73rd Ohio: Col Orland Smith; 75th Ohio: Col Nathaniel McLean; 82nd Ohio: Col James Cantwell; 1st Battalion, Connecticut Cavalry: Cpt Erastus Blakeslee; Battery K, 1st Ohio Light Artillery: Cpt William L. De Beck; Rigby's Battery, Indiana Light Artillery: Cpt Silas F. Rigby
Attached Independent Units	Attached Cavalry	3rd West Virginia Cavalry: Cpt Everton J. Conger; 6th Ohio Cavalry: Col William P. Lloyd

=== Department of the Rappahannock (formerly I Corps, Army of the Potomac) ===
MG Irvin McDowell (not present)

Division	Brigade	Regiments and Others
Shields Division; BG James Shields (not present)	Bayard's Brigade [Temporarily assigned to Fremont's command beginning May 30.] BG George Dashiell Bayard	1st New Jersey Cavalry: Ltc Joseph Kargé; 1st Pennsylvania Cavalry: Col Owen Jones; 13th Pennsylvania Reserves (1st Rifles) Battalion: Ltc Thomas L. Kane; 2nd Battery, Maine Light Artillery: Cpt James A. Hall
