= Battle of Cross Keys order of battle =

The order of battle for the Battle of Cross Keys includes:

- Battle of Cross Keys order of battle: Confederate
- Battle of Cross Keys order of battle: Union
