= 58th New York Infantry Regiment =

- Active: August 27, 1861–October 1, 1865
- Country: United States
- Allegiance: Union
- Branch: United States Army
- Type: Infantry
- Size: Regiment
- Nickname: Polish Legion
- Engagements: American Civil War: Battle of Cross Keys; Battle of Port Republic; First Battle of Rappahannock Station; Second Battle of Bull Run; Battle of Chancellorsville; Battle of Gettysburg; Battle of Boonsboro; Battle of Funkstown; Battle of Wauhatchie; Battle of Missionary Ridge

Commanders
- Notable commanders: Włodzimierz Krzyżanowski

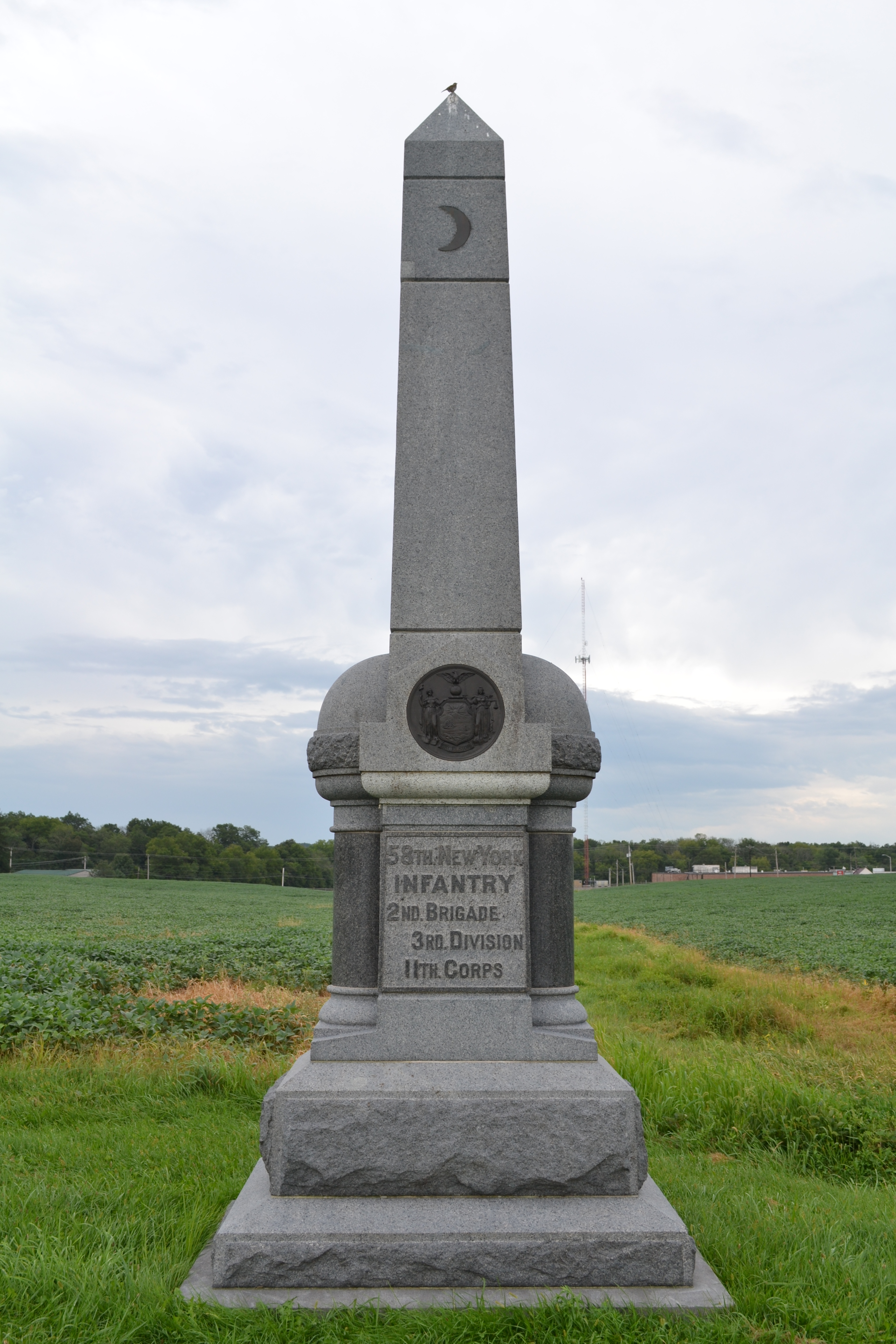
Monument to the 58th New York Volunteer Infantry at Gettysburg

The 58th New York Infantry Regiment, also called the Polish Legion, was an infantry regiment of United States Volunteers in Union Army service during the American Civil War. The regiment was composed almost entirely of immigrant volunteers: Poles, Germans, Danes, Italians, Russians, and Frenchmen, most of whom were recruited in New York City in 1861.

== Formation ==
In August 1861, Włodzimierz Krzyżanowski, a Polish officer who had fought in the Greater Poland Uprising (1848), was authorized by United States Secretary of War Simon Cameron to recruit a regiment. Krzyżanowski recruited about 400 men, whom Krzyżanowski called the United States Rifles. Cameron also authorized Frederick Gellman to recruit a regiment. Gellman recruited men, whom Gellman called the Morgan Rifles, (Note: Not to be confused with the 93rd New York Volunteer Infantry which was also called the Morgan Rifles.) in honor of Edwin D. Morgan, the governor of New York State. The Morgan Rifles was formed largely by consolidating with three other groups of volunteers: the Polish Legion, the Gallatin Rifles and the Humboldt Yaegers, which had been recruited by Colonel Julian Allen, Col. Theodore Lichtenstein and Col. Andrew Lutz, respectively. Separately, neither Krzyżanowski nor Gellman recruited enough volunteers to form a ten company regiment.

The regiment was constituted October 19, 1861, by consolidating four companies recruited by Krzyżanowski and six companies previously consolidated by Gellman. Krzyzanowski was commissioned a colonel, and Gellman a lieutenant colonel. The regiment recruits had mustered into United States service at New York City between August 27 and November 5. The regiment deployed from New York State on November 7 and proceeded to Washington, D.C. where it was attached to Brigadier General Henry Bohlen's Brigade of General Ludwig Blenker's Division, a division containing three brigades, whose regiments were composed almost entirely of immigrants.

== Eastern Theater ==
The regiment left Washington, crossed the Potomac River on November 13, 1861, into Virginia, and marched to Hunter's Crossroads, where it joined its division. It remained encamped here during the winter, except for one month in December and January, when it was placed on picket duty at Annandale Church.

Blenker's Division broke camp with the Army of the Potomac on March 18, 1862. The regiment marched in bitterly inclement weather which lasted 38 days, during which the men suffered because they lacked tents and rations. The division marched through Virginia from Hunter's Crossroads, to Burke, Fairfax Court House, Manassas Junction, Warrenton, Salem, Paris, Millwood, and arrived at Winchester, on April 20. After resting for two weeks at Winchester, the division started, on May 2, under command of General William Rosecrans, and after crossing the Allegheny Mountains marched into western Virginia through Romney, and joined General John C. Frémont's Mountain Department forces. On May 24, Frémont forces started for the Shenandoah Valley to pursue Confederate Major General Stonewall Jackson's campaign through the Shenandoah Valley.

The regiment's first engagement occurred on June 8 at the Battle of Cross Keys, Virginia, in which Frémont's forces were defeated by a Confederate corps under command of Jackson. The regiment made a bayonet charge in which the Confederate line was driven back about 100 yards (90 m), their gallantry on the battlefield was noted in Bohlen's official report. Captain Louis Schirmer, 2nd Independent Battery, New York Light Artillery, reported of the "great gallantry" with which the regiment supported his battery during some of the battle. The regiment suffered 29 casualties at Cross Keys: 7 killed, 18 wounded, and 4 missing. The Union forces pursued Jackson, were defeated on June 9 at the Battle of Port Republic, went down the Shenandoah Valley to Middletown, Virginia, where General Franz Sigel relieved Frémont of command. The regiment was assigned to the 2nd Brigade of Carl Schurz's Division, and Krzyżanowski was assigned command of the brigade.

Sigel's forces, had been designated I Corps, Army of Virginia, left Middletown on July 8, and marched via Front Royal and Luray to Sperryville, where they encamped until August 8, 1862, when they marched to assist Nathaniel P. Banks' II Corps, Army of Virginia, at the Battle of Cedar Mountain.

I Corps formed a part of General John Pope's Army of Virginia, and with it the regiment participated in the Northern Virginia Campaign's First Battle of Rappahannock Station, August 22–24. Under command of Major William Henkel, the regiment actively engaged in the Second Battle of Bull Run, August 29–30, and suffered 57 casualties: 14 killed, 32 wounded (including those mortally), and 11 missing. Henkel was severely wounded, but remained on the field for three hours after he was hit. The command of the regiment devolved to Captain Frederick Braun.

After the Manassas Campaign, the Army of the Potomac marched through Maryland to Battle of Antietam, leaving III Corps and I Corps — now the XI Corps — in the defences of Washington. XI Corps remained encamped near Fairfax and Centreville, Virginia, until the Battle of Fredericksburg, December 13, 1862, when it marched to Falmouth, Virginia, and back to winter quarters near Stafford Courthouse, Virginia. In the meantime Gellman and Henkel resigned their commissions and left the regiment.

The regiment, commanded of Captain Frederick Braun, left Stafford Courthouse camp, April 29, 1863, and marched to Chancellorsville, Virginia, where it engaged in the Battle of Chancellorsville. On the evening of May 2, when Jackson made his famous attack on XI Corps, he found that corps in no position to repel a flank attack, although repeated warnings of the impending danger had been transmitted from the Union pickets to XI Corps headquarters. When the Confederates attacked the right of XI Corps, about 5:15 pm, they encountered enough resistance from Charles Devens' 1st Division to check their advance long enough for Schurz's Division to change front and meet them. Schurz's regiments held the ground for a half hour or more, and then finding that the Confederate overlapped their line on either flank fell back. The regiment engaged in fighting, during which Braun, who was in command, was shot and mortally wounded on his horse. Captain Emil Koenig then assumed command. In this fighting, on the evening of May 2, the regiment suffered 31 casualties out of 238 officers and men engaged. The regiment was not engaged during the succeeding days of the battle, after which it recrossed the Rappahannock River with the army, and, marching in a rain storm, accompanied XI Corps back to the vacant Stafford Courthouse camp, which was reoccupied by the soldiers.

Leaving from the Stafford Courthouse camp on June 12 through Loudoun County, Virginia, to Gettysburg, Pennsylvania, the regiment, under command of Lieutenant Colonel August Otto, marched that day to Hartwood Church; then to Centreville; then to Goose Creek, where it encamped a week; it crossed the Potomac River at Edwards Ferry on the 25th, the column arrived at Jefferson, Maryland, late that night; next day, it marched to Middletown, where it rested two days; and then to Emmitsburg, Maryland, where General Oliver O. Howard's XI Corps was resting on the morning of July 1, 1863, the Battle of Gettysburg, First Day. At this time the regiment numbered 11 officers and 211 enlisted men.

=== Battle of Gettysburg ===
During the night of June 30 — the night before the Battle of Gettysburg — Koenig was ordered to take a 100-man detachment from the regiment, and make a reconnaissance in the direction of Creagerstown, Maryland, where Confederate cavalry had been seen. After marching about 5 miles (8.0 km), and not seeing any signs of Confederates, Koenig halted his detachment and gave his men an opportunity for rest and sleep. But he soon received a despatch ordering him to return with his detachment immediately, as the corps had already started on a march to Gettysburg. Koenig and his detachment returned to the regiment's vacant camp near Emmitsburg on July 1. Here he was joined by a squad of men belonging to the regiment who had been on picket during the night. With this squad and detachment, Koenig had more than half of the regiment with him. He started promptly to overtake the corps, pushing on with all possible speed, but was unable to do so, as he was ordered to march with the wagon train. A passing shower of rain drenched the men and damaged the roads; but although the water came down in torrents the shower did not extend to Gettysburg. About 4 miles (6.4 km) from Gettysburg heavy cannonade was heard, and Koenig and his detachment, left the wagon train and pressed forward at a fast pace, arriving at Gettysburg about 3:30 pm. After some delay in finding the corps, the detachment rejoined the regiment and brigade on Cemetery Hill. In the meantime the remainder of the regiment, composed of two companies, engaged in the battle of the First Day on the north side of the town, and had fallen back through the streets to Cemetery Hill, with the rest of the army. In the evening, Otto was detailed by Schurz, the division commander, to act as his chief of staff, leaving Koenig in command of the regiment.

During the Battle of Gettysburg, Second Day, the regiment supported artillery on Cemetery Hill, which began counter-battery fire against Confederate batteries on Benner's Hill in the afternoon. Confederate artillery barrage against the position of XI Corps, the exploding fragments dealing death and wounds throughout the ranks of every regiment. First Lieutenant Louis Dietrich, regimental adjutant, was struck by one of these missiles and killed, while several others in the regiment were killed or wounded during this artillery fire. Among the mortally wounded were Captains Edward Antonieski and Gustave Stoldt.

At dusk Harry T. Hays's Louisiana Brigade (Louisiana Tigers) and Robert Hoke's North Carolina Brigade assaulted the Union position on East Cemetery Hill, and attaining a temporary success charged up the slope and through the line of cannon in Captain Michael Wiedrich's Battery I, New York Light Artillery, driving the gun crews from their weapons. Led by Schurz in person, the regiment and 119th New York Volunteer Infantry Regiment hastened to rescue the artillery, but the Confederates were repulsed without their assistance. As another attack was momentarily expected, the regiment was ordered to remain, one of its companies, under Lieutenant Schwartz, being sent out as skirmishers to ascertain the direction in which the Confederates had moved.

On the morning of July 3 the regiment moved to the right of the Baltimore Pike leading into Gettysburg, and into a position behind a stone fence on the left of Wiedrich's Battery. Schwartz with one company was sent forward to take possession of the houses on the outskirts of Gettysburg. He did so. During the day, Confederate sharpshooters kept up a continuous fire on these houses.

The Confederates began retreat from Gettysburg during the night of July 3 and Schwartz sent out a reconnaissance patrol. The citizens indicated the houses in which Confederates might be found. The patrol entered the houses and captured several Confederate sharpshooters who were not notified to retreat. Shortly after, two squads from the patrol were sent into Gettysburg and returned with about 200 prisoners of war in custody.

The regiment joined the pursuit of General Robert E. Lee's defeated Army of Northern Virginia, and crossing the Potomac River returned to Virginia on July 19.

== Western Theater ==
In September, 1863, XI Corps and XII Corps were ordered to Western Theater to assist General Rosecrans' Army of the Cumberland which was shut up in Chattanooga, Tennessee. The troops were transported by railroad from Virginia, through Washington, Maryland, West Virginia, Ohio, Indiana, Kentucky, and into Tennessee. Krzyżanowski retained command of the brigade and the regiment was commanded by Captain Michael Esembaux. While encamped near Chattanooga, about 200 of the original members re-enlisted, received the customary sixty-day veteran's furlough, and returned to New York City, January 26, 1864, where they received a grand reception and ovation from the mayor, city officials, and the German citizens.

Prior to this furlough, the regiment, commanded by Esembaux, was present at the night combat Battle of Wauhatchie, Tennessee, on October 28, 1863, and at the Battle of Missionary Ridge, November 23, 1863, and suffering slight casualties.

During 1864 and 1865, the regiment was stationed at Bridgeport, Tennessee, and along the Nashville and Chattanooga Railroad, on garrison duty and guarded the railroad communications of the army. After XI Corps was merged into the new XX Corps, in April, 1864, Krzyzanowski was left without a brigade command and returned as the regiment commander. During the conclusion of the American Civil War, the regiment proceeded to Nashville, Tennessee, in September, 1865, where it was paid and discharged on October 1, 1865.
