= 19th Mississippi Infantry Regiment =

Infantry regiment of the Confederate States Army

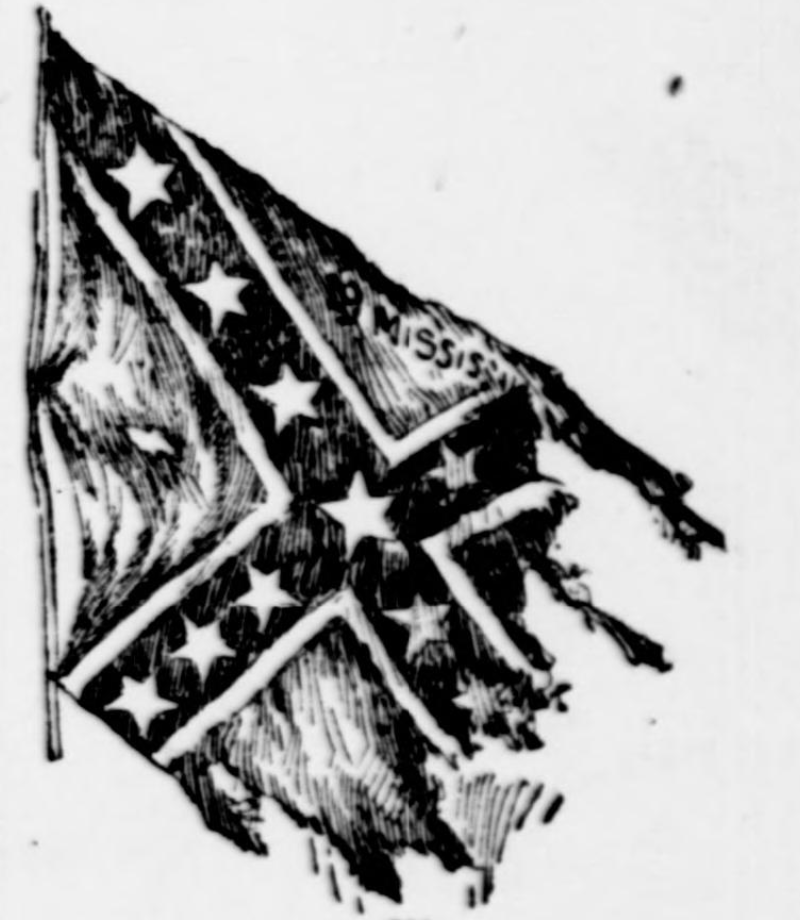
- Regimental flag
- Active: 1861–1865
- Disbanded: April 12, 1865
- Country: Confederate States
- Allegiance: Mississippi
- Branch: Army
- Type: Infantry
- Size: Regiment
- Part of: Harris' Brigade
- Facings: Light blue
- Arms: Enfield rifled muskets
- Battles: American Civil War; Peninsula Campaign; Northern Virginia Campaign; Maryland Campaign; Battle of Fredericksburg; Battle of Chancellorsville; Gettysburg campaign; Battle of the Wilderness; Battle of Spotsylvania Court House; Battle of Cold Harbor; Siege of Petersburg; Appomattox Campaign
- Battle honors: Williamsburg; Seven Pines

Commanders
- Commanding officers: Col. Christopher Mott †; Col. Lucius Lamar; Col. Nathaniel Harris; Col. Thomas Hardin †; Col. Richard Phipps

The 19th Mississippi Infantry Regiment was an infantry formation of the Confederate States Army in the Eastern Theater of the American Civil War. It was successively commanded by Colonels Christopher Mott, Lucius Lamar, Nathaniel Harris, Thomas Hardin, and Richard Phipps.

== History ==
The Nineteenth Mississippi was organized on June 1, 1861, at Richmond, Virginia from volunteer companies organized from the counties of Noxubee, Lafayette, Warren, Jefferson, Tippah, Marshall, and Itawamba. The regiment was organized by law partners Lucius Q. C. Lamar, a professor at the University of Mississippi, and Christopher Mott, a veteran of the Mexican War. Mott and Lamar were then elected as Colonel and Lieutenant Colonel of the regiment, respectively.

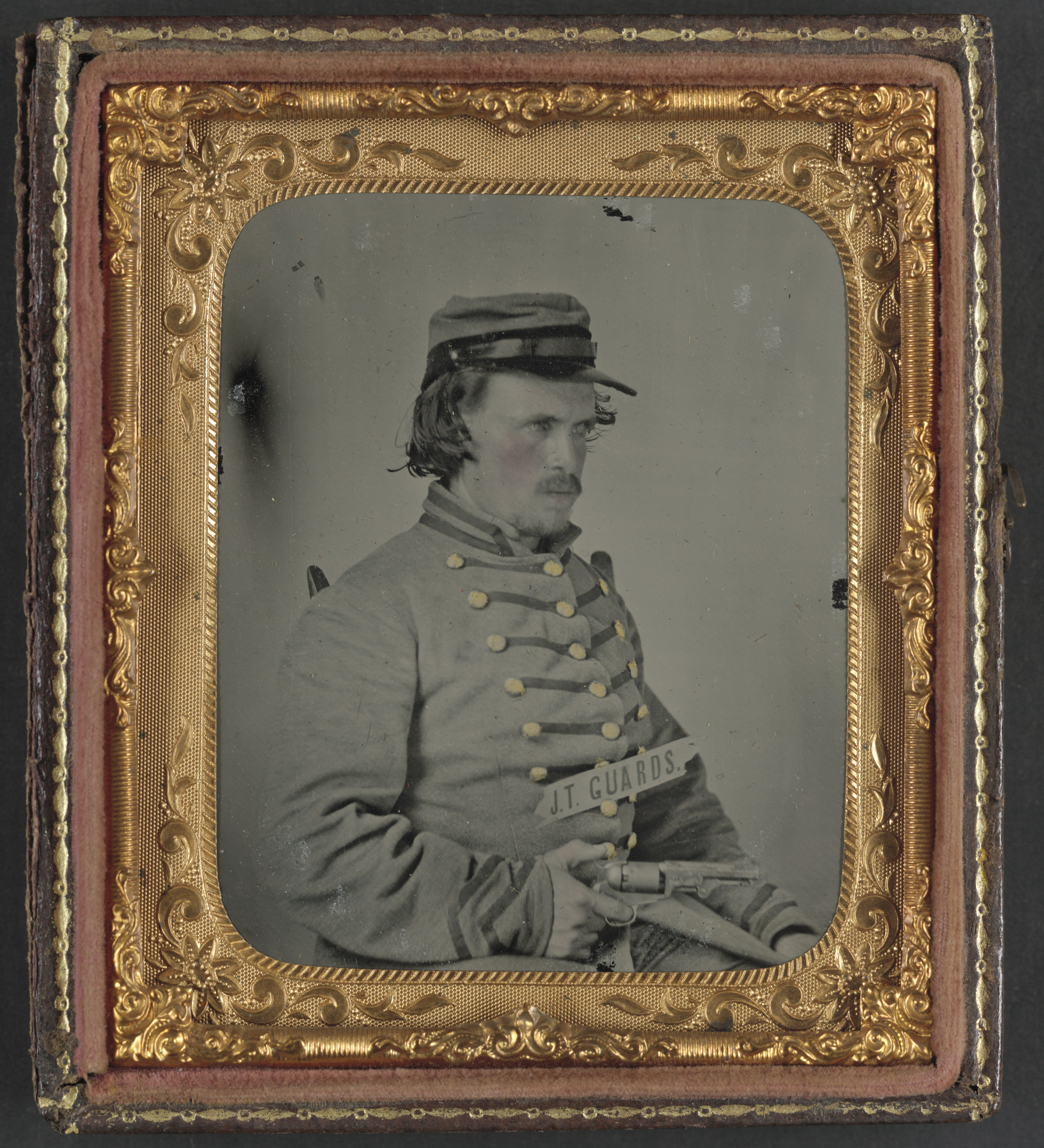
Unidentified member of the "Jake Thompson Guards;" mustered into service as Company K, 19th Mississippi Infantry Regiment, c. 1861.

As part of the Army of Northern Virginia, the 19th Mississippi first fought at the Battle of Williamsburg in May, 1862, where Colonel Mott was killed. The regiment then fought at Seven Pines, and shortly afterward Col. Lamar had to resign due to disability. During the Seven Days Battles, the 19th Regiment fought at Gaines' Mill and Glendale. Later in 1862 the Regiment was heavily engaged at the battles of Second Manassas, Harpers Ferry, Antietam, and Fredericksburg.

In 1863, the 19th Regiment fought at the Battle of Chancellorsville, and was then assigned to A.P. Hill's corps prior to the Gettysburg campaign. Under General Carnot Posey, the Regiment arrived at Gettysburg to join the second day of the battle, participating in heavy fighting before retreating with the rest of Lee's army to Virginia. In the fall of 1863 the Regiment fought at Bristoe Station, where General Posey was killed. Col. Nathaniel H. Harris of the 19th Mississippi was then promoted to Brigadier General and Posey's former brigade, including the 19th, was placed under his command.

In the spring of 1864, the 19th Mississippi was engaged at the Battle of the Wilderness and took part in heavy fighting at the Battle of Spotsylvania Court House while opposing Ulysses S. Grant's advance into Virginia. The Regiment held a supporting position at the Battle of Cold Harbor and afterward they were moved to Petersburg, Virginia to join the defensive line there. During the 9-month long Siege of Petersburg, the Regiment participated in many actions against the Federal line, including heavy fighting during the Breakthrough at Petersburg on April 2nd. The regiment retreated with the remainder of the Confederate forces before surrendering at the conclusion of the Appomattox campaign.

Overall, the 19th Regiment lost 15 killed and 85 wounded of the 501 engaged at Williamsburg, had 58 killed, 264 wounded, and three missing at Gaines' Mill and Frayser's Farm, and had six killed and 52 wounded in the Maryland Campaign. Its casualties were six killed and 40 wounded at Chancellorsville and seven percent of the 372 at Gettysburg disabled. On April 9, 1865, it surrendered with eight officers and 129 men.

== Regimental order of battle ==
Companies of the Nineteenth Mississippi Regiment:

- Company A, "President Davis Guards" of Noxubee County.
- Company B, "Mott Guards" of Lafayette County.
- Company C, "Warren Rifles" of Vicksburg.
- Company D, "Thomas Hinds Guards" of Jefferson County.
- Company E, "McClung Riflemen" of Lafayette County.
- Company F, "Avant Southrons" of Lafayette County.
- Company G, "Springport Invincibles" of Panola County.
- Company H, "Salem Cavalry" of Benton County.
- Company I, of Marshall County.
- Company K, "Jake Thompson Guards" of Tishomingo and Itawamba counties.

== Commanding officers ==
- Col. Christopher H. Mott, killed at Williamsburg, Virginia, 1862.
- Col. L.Q.C. Lamar, resigned 1862 due to disability.
- Col. Nathaniel H. Harris
- Col. Thomas J. Hardin, killed at Spotsylvania, Virginia, 1864
- Col. Richard W. Phipps
- Lt. Col. W.G. Vaughn
- Lt. Col. James H. Duncan

== See also ==
- List of Mississippi Civil War Confederate units

== Bibliography ==
- Allardice, Bruce S. (2008). Confederate Colonels: A Biographical Register. Columbia: University of Missouri Press. ISBN 978-0-8262-1809-4.
- Davis, Mathew Jack (1934). Reminiscence of the War for Secession and of Fort Delaware. Unpublished manuscript. Briscoe Center for American History.
- Gottfried, Bradley M. (2002). Brigades of Gettysburg: The Union and Confederate Brigades at the Battle of Gettysburg. New York: Skyhorse Publishing, Inc. ISBN 978-1-61608-401-1.
- Roberts, Bobby; Moneyhon, Carl (1993). Portraits of Conflict: A Photographic History of Mississippi in the Civil War. Fayetteville: The University of Arkansas Press. ISBN 1-55728-260-9.
- "U.S. Army Campaigns: Civil War". Center of Military History. United States Army.
- Wheeler, Maj.-Gen. Joseph; Hooker, Col. Charles E. (1899). Evans, Brig.-Gen. Clement A. (ed.). Confederate Military History. Vol. XII. Atlanta: Confederate Publishing.
