= 45th New York Infantry Regiment =

- Active: September 9, 1861, to October 1, 1865
- Country: United States
- Allegiance: Union
- Branch: Infantry
- Engagements: Battle of Cross Keys; Second Battle of Bull Run; Battle of Chancellorsville; Battle of Gettysburg; Battle of Wauhatchie; Battle of Chattanooga; Battle of Missionary Ridge; Battle of Resaca; Battle of Dallas; Battle of Kennesaw Mountain

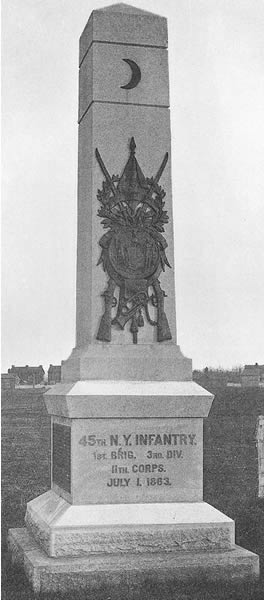
45th N. Y. Volunteer Infantry Regiment monument at Gettysburg

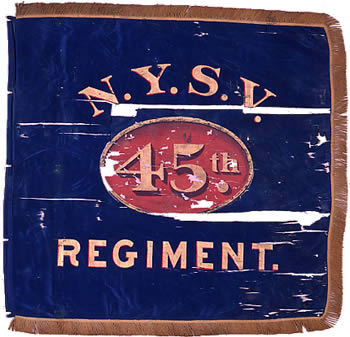
Flank marker

The 45th New York Infantry Regiment, also known as the 5th German Rifles, was an infantry regiment that served in the Union Army during the American Civil War. It was composed almost entirely of German immigrants. Formed approximately five months after the start of hostilities, the unit's service spanned almost the entirety of the war, and it saw action in several of the war's noteworthy battles, in both the Eastern and Western Theaters.

== Service ==
=== Muster and Deployment ===
The regiment was organized in New York City by Colonel George von Amsberg, a veteran Austrian cavalry officer and revolutionary in the Hungarian revolution of 1848. The unit was mustered in for a three-year enlistment on September 9, 1861. On September 14, 1861, it received its numerical unit designation from New York State. For the next month it encamped at the Landmann's Park section of Jones's Wood, at 3rd Avenue and 69th Street in Manhattan, and continued to recruit. Since 1991 this intersection on the east side of 3rd Avenue has been the location of Trump Palace Condominiums, but in the second half of the 1800s it was wooded, and a popular recreation area frequented by German immigrants.

At the time of its State inspection for muster into United States service the regiment consisted of 743 troops, organized in 10 companies and a band. By October 1861 it numbered 860, plus the accompanying band at 24 pieces. The regiment left New York for Washington DC on October 9, 1861.

On October 12, 1861, the 45th was assigned to 1st Brigade of Louis Blenker's division of German immigrants (5th Division, Army of the Potomac). It encamped for the winter at Hunter's Chapel, Virginia. This camp is believed to have been located in what is today Arlington, Virginia, at the intersection of Glebe Road and Columbia Pike, at that time the site of the Hunter's Chapel Methodist Church.

=== Eastern Theater ===
On December 2, 1861, while stationed in winter quarters at Hunter's Chapel, the regiment saw its first action of the war in a skirmish several miles to the south-west at Annandale, Virginia. Pickets of Company A were surprised by Confederate cavalry, who had been mistaken for Union forces. It was during this engagement that the regiment also received its first casualties, all from Company A, with private Carsten Huhnenberg killed in action and 12 others missing.

In April 1862 Blenker's Division was transferred to the Mountain Department under Major General John C. Frémont, in response to the threat to Washington posed by Stonewall Jackson's Valley Campaign. The 45th Regiment arrived at Winchester, Virginia, on the Northern end of the Shenandoah Valley, on April 19, 1862. On May 1, 1862, the 45th left Winchester for Fremont's camp near Petersburg, approximately 70 miles west through mountainous terrain. It arrived in Petersburg between May 9 and 11, 1862. According to Fremont, much of Blenker's division arrived late, exhausted, exposed to hardship, and severely lacking in equipment, with particular need of shoes, blankets, and overcoats. One statement in his report illustrates their state of supply; "In the important matter of arms there was great deficiency, Belgian or Austrian muskets of old and indifferent patterns being carried by many of the regiments."

Despite the condition of Blenker's troops and the arrival of the last of them in Petersburg less than 24 hours prior, reaction to Jackson's movements prompted Fremont to immediately redeploy the division to Franklin, 30 miles to the south. At 4am on May 12, 1862, the division forded the Shenandoah and started for Franklin. It arrived before noon on May 14, 1862, having camped only one night on the way. Provisions during this time were in short supply. On May 25, 1862, Blenker's division was again on the march for Petersburg, arriving the next day, and on May 27, 1862, proceeded through storms and night marches to Strasburg, 60 miles east. The troops were allowed one day's rest en route, as demanded by Fremont's medical director, allowing "hundreds of stragglers and broken down men from the Blenker division" to catch up.

On June 8, 1862, it was engaged in the Battle of Cross Keys, in which it suffered a total of 19 casualties. During this battle the regiment took part in a three-hour assault on a Confederate position in the woods on the road to Port Republic, which included hand-to-hand fighting with Bayonets. It subsequently retired to Middletown, Virginia. At this time many of the men were on the sick list due to constant and severe marches with insufficient food during May and early June.

On June 26, 1862, Abraham Lincoln created the Army of Virginia, commanded by Major General John Pope, and the Mountain Department was redesignated as I Corps of this army. The 45th was assigned to 1st Division (under Brigadier General Robert C. Schenck), 1st Brigade (Brigadier General Julius Stahel) of this new corps. Fremont resigned rather than serve under Pope, and on June 29, 1862, Major General Franz Sigel, a commander politically calculated to be popular with German troops, assumed command of the corps. In July and August the regiment was ordered to Sperryville, Madison Court House, Gordonsville, Cuylersville, Cedar Mountain and White Sulphur Springs. The regiment was engaged in skirmishing at Freeman's Ford and White Sulphur Springs in what is collectively referred to as the First Battle of Rappahannock Station.

At the end of August 1862 it was engaged in the Second Battle of Bull Run. During this battle the 45th was commanded by Lieutenant Colonel Wratislaw. In the course of Pope's campaign between August 16, 1862, through Second Bull Run the regiment suffered 47 casualties. From September 3–21, 1862, the regiment was encamped at Lewinsville, Virginia. It was then stationed at Centreville, Virginia, through November 3, 1862.

While the 45th was at Centreville, pursuant to General Orders No. 129 of September 12, 1862, the I Corps's designation was changed to XI Army Corps, and it was reassigned to the Army of the Potomac. In subsequent weeks 1st Division was successively posted at Thoroughfare Gap, Aldie and Chantilly.

The 45th arrived at Falmouth on December 11, 1862, as part of General Sigel's reserves for the Battle of Fredericksburg, though it did not see action in that engagement. Subsequent to the battle it was withdrawn to Stafford Court House where it entered winter quarters.

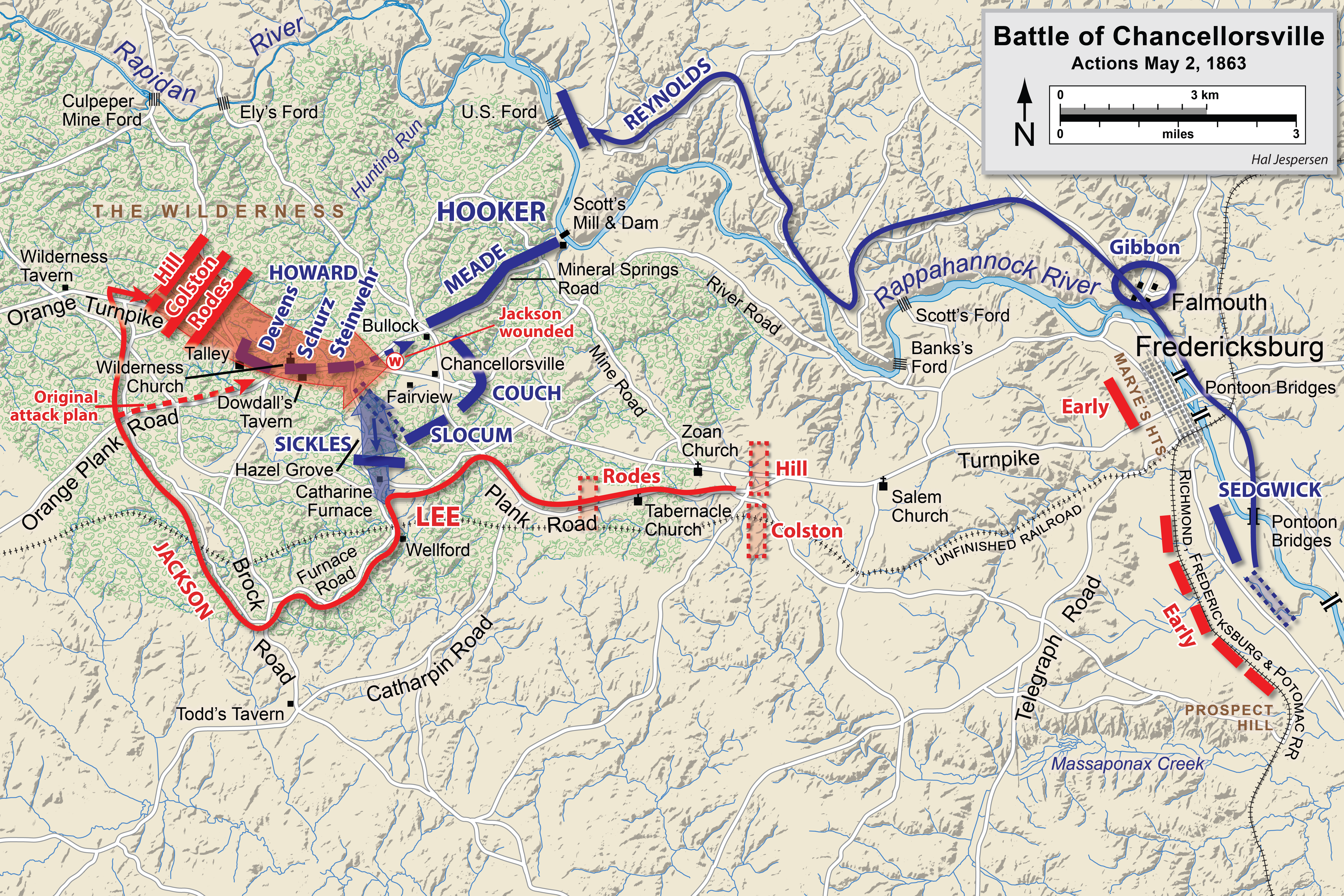
Chancellorsville, actions on May 2. The 45th, with 1st Division under Devens, was in the angled formation on the Union far right flank (left of map).

Maj. Gen Oliver Otis Howard replaced Sigel in command of XI Corps, and, in the spring of 1863, was in command during the Battle of Chancellorsville. Howard, despite having been ordered to do so, failed to take action to protect his flank. The 45th Regiment, under Colonel George von Amsberg, was assigned to 1st Division, General Charles Devens commanding. This division bore the brunt of a concentrated Confederate attack to the exposed Union right flank on May 2, 1863. Devons' division collapsed under the onslaught of over 20,000 men under the command of Stonewall Jackson. The 45th suffered 76 casualties (killed, wounded, and missing) during the battle.

In June 1863 the regiment, still with XI Corps under Howard, was assigned to 3rd Division, 1st Brigade, and was deployed to Gettysburg.

On July 1, 1863, the first day of battle at Gettysburg, the 45th Regiment was among some of the earliest Union units to arrive on the field, XI Corps following shortly after I Corps. Sometime between 10:00 and 11:00 Maj. Gen. John F. Reynolds, in command of the left wing of the Army of the Potomac, was killed. This elevated XI Corps commander Howard to command of all Union forces on the field, which had a cascading effect on the command structure down to the 45th Regiment; command of XI Corps devolved to division commander Carl Schurz, command of 1st Division fell to Brigadier General Alexander Schimmelfennig, regimental commander Col George von Amsberg assumed command of 1st Brigade, and Lieutenant Colonel Adolphus Dobke took command of the regiment.

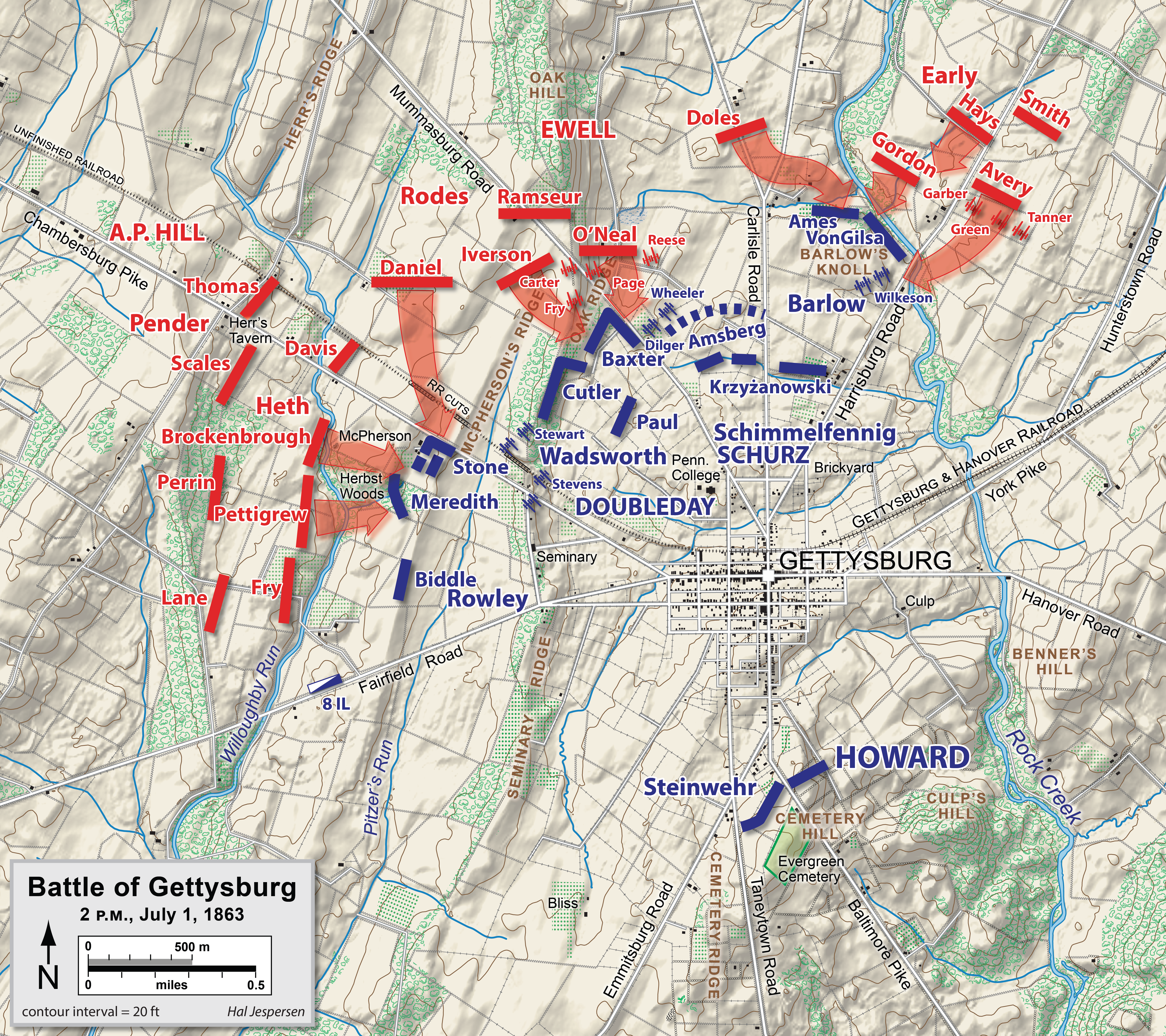
von Amsberg's position, 2pm July 1, 1863. The 45th was on the far left of the skirmish line, in advance of Dilger's battery, along Mummasberg Road.

XI Corps arrived before noon, 1st Division leading. The division was sent north to deploy to Oak Ridge to the right of the I Corps. However, finding that the movement of Confederate forces prevented this action, they were forced to take position in a broad plain east of the ridge and north of the town.

In order to cover the necessary territory with limited forces, the 45th deployed as skirmishers in this location at about 11:00. They were immediately subject to heavy fire of grape, canister, solid shot, and shell from Confederate batteries on the hill. At 1:30 a Confederate movement on the extreme left of the 45th and right of I Corps exposed its flank to the 45th at very short range and was the target of a withering crossfire between the 45th and I Corps. This formation suffered heavy casualties, with survivors taken prisoner and sent rear.

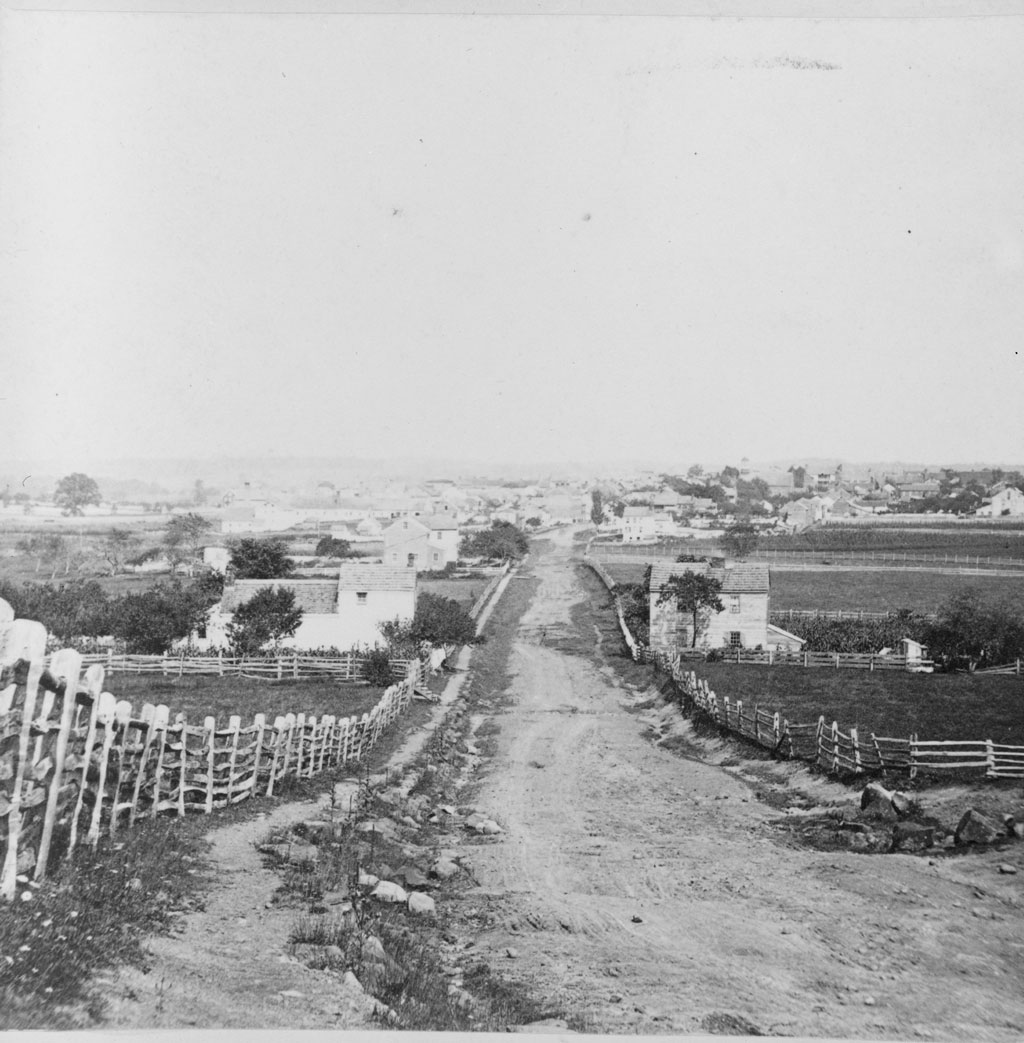
Gettysburg viewed from the area of the Lutheran Seminary

At 4:00 pm a weakening of the lines in this area precipitated an order for the 45th to retreat, and it fell back to the Seminary with orders to cover the retreat of I and XI Corps through the town. After they had passed the regiment was ordered to follow, and a running battle through the streets of Gettysburg ensued. Eventually the regiment turned down an alley and emerged into an enclosed square, the only exit of which had been blockaded by Confederate sharpshooters with the bodies of dead Union soldiers. Only about 100 men, one third of the regiment, escaped this situation to assemble behind a stone fence on Cemetery Hill. The rest were killed, captured, or missing.

The regiment remained in relative quiet in this position until 4:00 pm the next day, when Confederate batteries opened a heavy fire on Cemetery Hill. The regiment was ordered to the relief of XII Corps on Culp's Hill that evening and returned to Cemetery Hill at daylight. On July 3, 1863, volunteer sharpshooters from the regiment were employed against Confederate artillery and assisted in repelling Pickett's charge.

In total, the regiment suffered 224 casualties at Gettysburg. Captain Francis Irsch was awarded the Medal of Honor for "Gallantry in flanking the enemy and capturing a number of prisoners and in holding a part of the town against heavy odds while the Army was rallying on Cemetery Hill" on July 1.

=== Western Theater ===
An overview of the Chattanooga area. Actions in the Battle of Wauhatchie occurred on the West of the Tennessee River and Lookout Mountain, between Brown's Ferry and roughly Geary's position. The 45th was involved in taking Orchard Knob (center of map), from which Grant later commanded the assault on Missionary Ridge. The unit was not heavily involved in the Battle of Missionary Ridge, taking a position on Sherman's left flank on the north-east side of the ridge, near the Tunnel Hill and the South Chickamauga.

After Gettysburg, the remaining ranks of the 45th were gathered together and the XI (and XII) Corps of the Army of the Potomac, under the command of Major General Joseph Hooker, were moved to the Western Theater to reinforce the Army of the Cumberland around Chattanooga, Tennessee.

To avoid consuming the limited rations available in Chattanooga, Hooker's troops were at first held to the railroad, where they could be supplied, and later staged at Bridgeport, Alabama, to await deployment. On October 26, Hooker crossed the Tennessee River. As of this time 3rd Division was commanded by Major General Carl Schurz, and 1st Brigade by Brigadier General Hector Tyndale.

From October 27–28, 1863, the regiment was engaged in the Battle of Wauhatchie, just outside Chattanooga to the west and north of Lookout Mountain. These actions were initiated to protect the "cracker line" – the recently established supply line by which Union troops, effectively under siege in and about Chattanooga, were supported. Subsequent movements were intended to reinforce Geary. The regiment suffered two casualties.

The 45th played a primarily support role in the movements of Sherman's army, including actions at Dallas, Resaca, and Kennesaw Mountain.

After Wauhatchie and Lookout valley Schurz's Division (3rd) was temporarily put under the command of William Tecumseh Sherman in support of his assault on the Confederate right on Missionary Ridge. The main movement of Hooker's XI Corps was to push across Lookout Mountain toward the south end of Missionary Ridge. 3rd Division played a supporting role on the Union left in the Battle of Missionary Ridge. It was not heavily engaged, however, and suffered no casualties.

This ended major operations for the 45th for the 1863 season. On February 2, 1864, it was granted 30 days veteran furlough.

In April 1864 the XI and XII Divisions were consolidated and designated XX Corps. The 45th was assigned to the 2d Brigade, 1st Division, 20th Corps, with which it served in the Atlanta Campaign through July 1864. It was present for the battles of Dallas, Resaca, and Kennesaw Mountain, however, it did not perform a major role in these engagements. It suffered no casualties in the campaign.

=== Post Duty and Muster Out ===
In July 1864 the 45th was attached to the Department of the Cumberland at Nashville, Tennessee. It remained there until the close of the war. Original members who did not reenlist were mustered out October 8, 1864. Enough reenlisted, however, that the unit was retained as a veteran regiment. It was present for the Battle of Nashville on December 15–16, 1864, as part of the Post of Nashville (2nd Brigade, 4th Division, XX Corps). On June 30, 1865, it was consolidated with the 58th Regiment New York Volunteer Infantry and with it mustered out of service on October 1, 1865.

== Casualties ==
Killed in action: 4 officers, 31 enlisted
Died of wounds received in action: 1 officer, 17 enlisted
Died of disease and other causes: 2 officers, 106 enlisted
In aggregate 161, of whom 3 officers, 19 enlisted men, died in the hands of the enemy.

== Commanders ==
- George von Amsberg
- Edward C. Wratislaw
- Charles Koch
- Adolphus Dobke

== Significant locations ==
Date	Point	Coordinates (links to map & photo sources)
1861-09-09	Jones's Wood Encampment	40.767653°N 73.961912°W
1861–1862 (Winter)	Camp Hunter's Chapel	38.861269°N 77.091982°W
1862-04-19	Winchester, VA	39.199411°N 78.199424°W
1862-06-08	Battle of Cross Keys	38.357900°N 78.843800°W
1862-08-28	2nd Battle of Bull Run	38.818382°N 77.526758°W
1863-05-02	Battle of Chancellorsville	38.311830°N 77.674917°W
1863-07-01	Gettysburg Monument	39.840527°N 77.235692°W
1863-07-01	Gettysburg Advance Position Marker	39.844687°N 77.239925°W
1863-10-28	Battle of Wauhatchie	35.028037°N 85.359982°W
1863-11-23	Battle of Chattanooga NY Monument	35.039852°N 85.273942°W
1864-05-13	Battle of Resaca	34.581500°N 84.938500°W
1864-05-26 – 1864-06-04	Battle of Dallas	33.912700°N 84.828000°W
1864-06-27	Battle of Kennesaw Mountain	33.919252°N 84.605995°W
July 1864 – October 1865	Post of Nashville	36.145092°N 86.774701°W

== See also ==
- German Americans in the Civil War
- Infantry in the American Civil War
- New York in the Civil War
- List of New York Civil War regiments
