= 16th Mississippi Infantry Regiment =

- Active: 1861–1865
- Disbanded: April 9, 1865
- Country: Confederate States
- Allegiance: Mississippi
- Branch: Confederate States Army
- Type: Infantry
- Size: Regiment
- Battles: American Civil War: Jackson's Valley campaign; Seven Days Battles; Second Battle of Bull Run; Battle of Antietam; Battle of Fredericksburg; Battle of Chancellorsville; Battle of the Wilderness; Battle of Spotsylvania Court House; Battle of Cold Harbor; Siege of Petersburg

Commanders
- Notable commanders: Carnot Posey

The 16th Mississippi Infantry Regiment was a unit of the Confederate States Army from southern Mississippi that participated in the Eastern theater of the American Civil War as part of the Army of Northern Virginia. The 16th Regiment fought in numerous battles, taking heavy casualties at Antietam and Spotsylvania Court House before surrendering after Union troops broke through the defenses of Petersburg, Virginia, on April 2, 1865.

== Formation ==
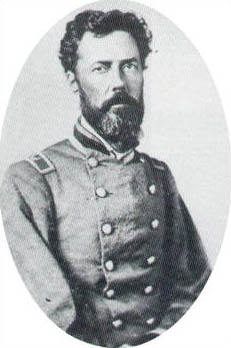
Carnot Posey, Colonel of the 16th Regiment from 1861 to 1863, promoted to brigadier general.

The 16th Regiment was assembled from volunteer companies formed across southern Mississippi from March–May 1861. The companies were assembled at Corinth, initially for state service, and then mustered into Confederate service on June 17. Carnot Posey, who had served in the 1st Mississippi Rifles alongside Jefferson Davis during the Mexican-American War, was chosen as the Regiment's colonel. The Regiment left for Richmond, Virginia, on July 26, with a total original strength of 950 men and officers.

== Virginia and Maryland, 1861-1862 ==
In Virginia, the 16th was initially assigned to George B. Crittenden's brigade, before being moved under Stonewall Jackson's command in May, 1862. During Jackson's Valley campaign, the Regiment fought at Cross Keys and Port Republic. The regiment was the only Mississippi unit to participate in the valley campaign, and their performance under fire at Port Republic earned them praise from General Richard S. Ewell.

The 16th then moved to the Virginia Peninsula to join the Seven Days Battles against Union General George B. McClellan's forces. At the Battle of Gaines' Mill on June 27, the 16th Mississippi alongside the 21st North Carolina charged a fortified Union position, forcing the Federal troops to retreat. General Isaac R. Trimble praised the regiment in his official report, writing that "the charge of the Sixteenth Mississippi and Twenty-first North Carolina, sustained from the first movement without a falter, could not be surpassed for intrepid bravery and high resolve." The regiment also fought in the last battle of the Seven Days, at Malvern Hill, and then afterward was transferred to General Winfield S. Featherston's Mississippi brigade.

The 16th fought at Second Manassas in late August and the Battle of Harpers Ferry in September. The Regiment then moved north into Maryland to participate in the Battle of Antietam, with Col. Posey of the 16th commanding the brigade. At Antietam, Captain A.M. Feltus reported that the Regiment was hit by a "a murderous fire of grape, canister, shell, and small-arms." Of the 228 men of the regiment engaged, 144 were killed or wounded. Afterwards the Regiment fought at the Battle of Fredericksburg in December. The 16th Regiment was moved to a defensive position along the Rappahannock River.

== Virginia, Maryland, and Pennsylvania, 1863 ==
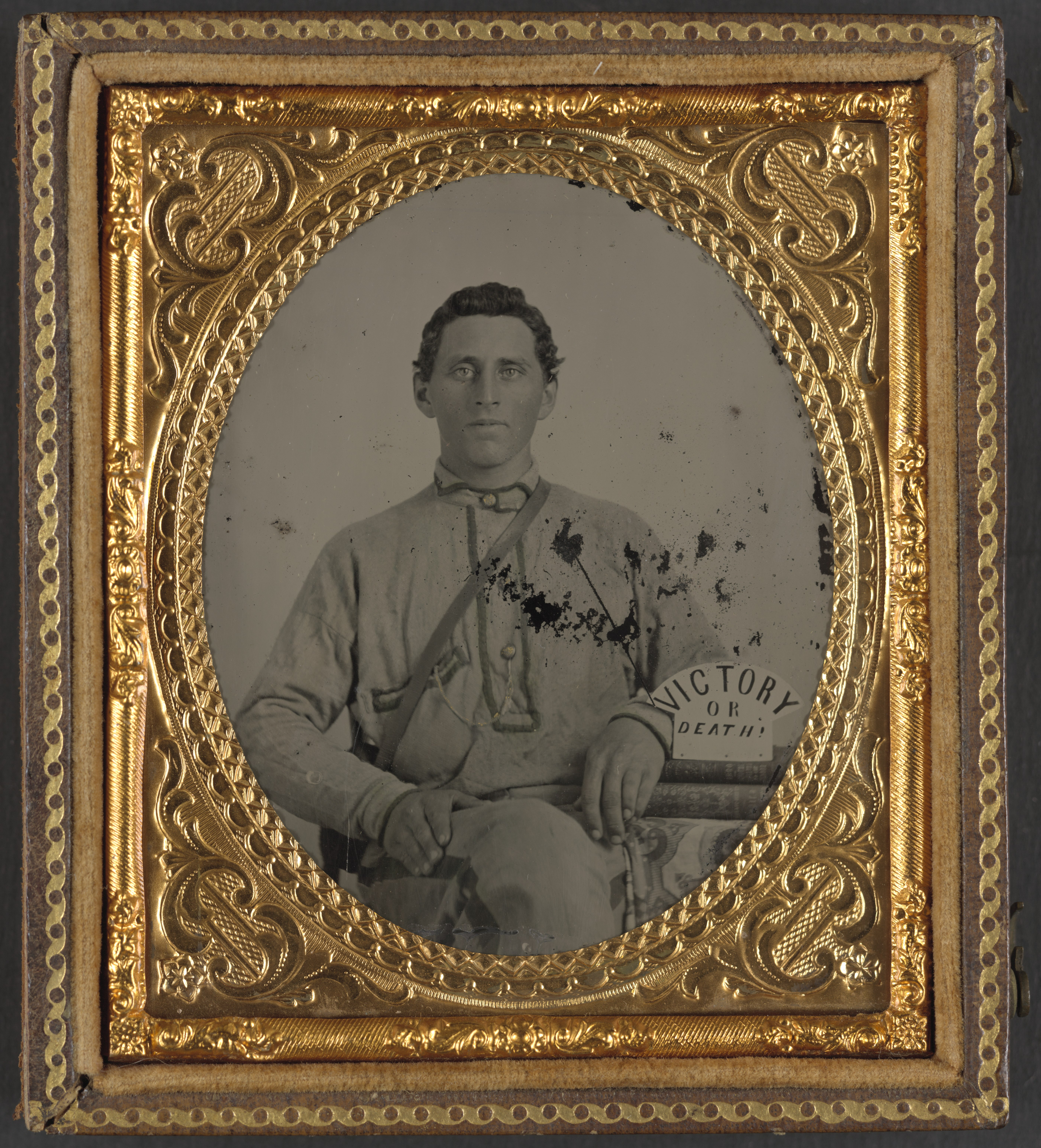
Private Silas H. Shirley, Company H, 16th Mississippi Infantry Regiment, 1861.

Commanding officer Colonel Carnot Posey was promoted to brigadier general in January 1863, and Samuel Baker was promoted to take command of the Regiment. In the spring of 1863, the regiment fought at the Battle of Chancellorsville, losing their regimental colors during a charge against Union fortifications.

The 16th then moved north to participate in the Gettysburg campaign, but was held in reserve until late in the evening of July 2, seeing limited action during the second day of the battle. During the retreat from Gettysburg, the Regiment fought at Hagerstown before withdrawing to Virginia. On October 14, the 16th fought at the Battle of Bristoe Station, and General Posey died after being wounded by artillery fire. Col. Samuel E. Baker of the 16th took command of Posey's brigade temporarily, before General Nathaniel H. Harris took over, leading the Mississippians at Mine Run in November.

== Overland campaign and Petersburg, 1864-1865 ==
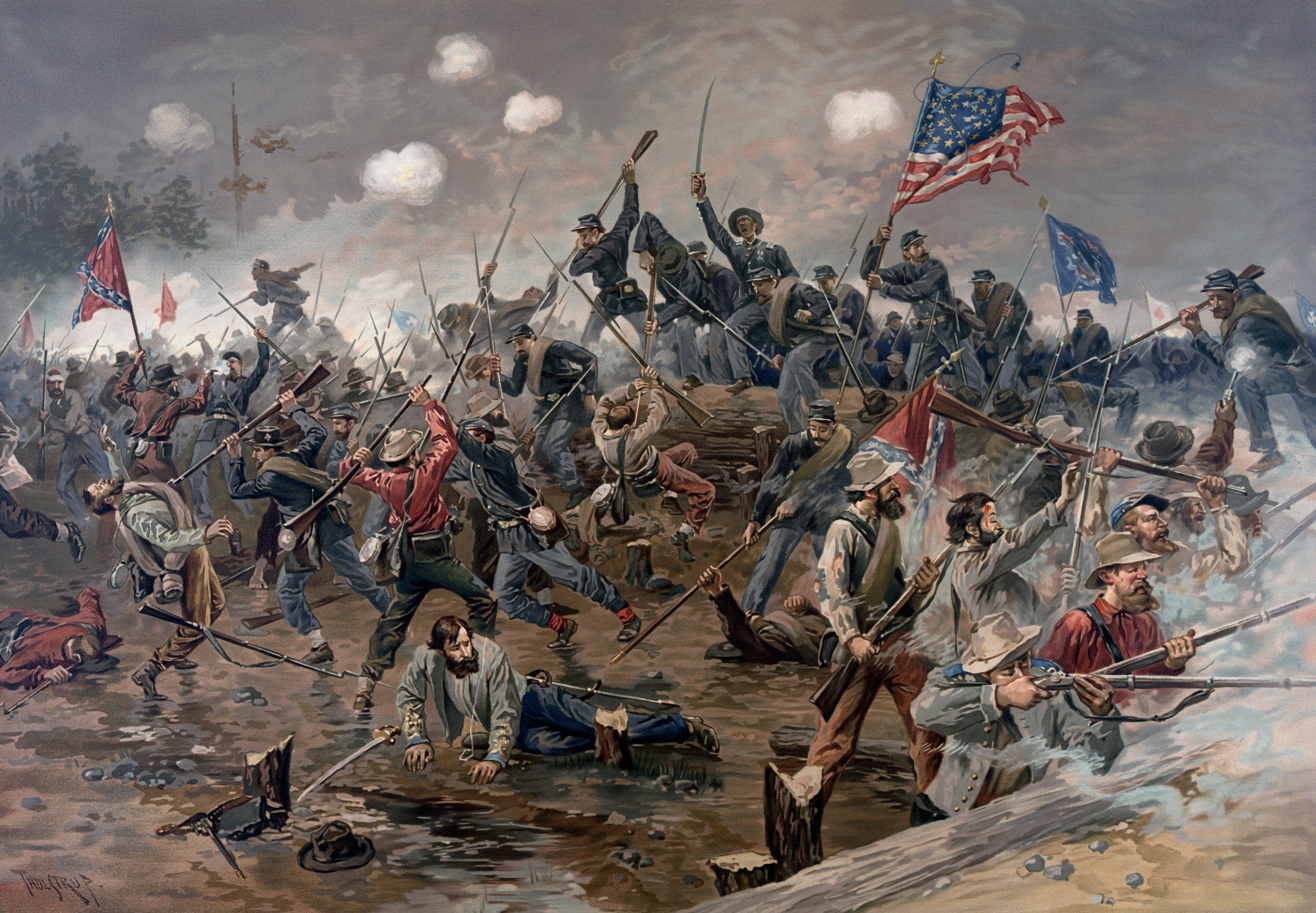
The Battle of Spotsylvania Court House, at which the regiment engaged in fierce hand-to-hand combat

The men and officers of the Regiment re-enlisted for the duration of the war in the winter of 1864, and the Confederate Congress passed a joint resolution thanking them for "their patriotic resolution."

In May 1864, the Regiment under Harris' command fought at the Battle of the Wilderness, and then the Battle of Spotsylvania Court House, taking part in heavy fighting at the so-called "Bloody Angle". This location was the site of some of the fiercest combat of the civil war, as Union and Confederate troops made desperate attacks and counter-attacks over nearly 24 hours of continuous battle. General Harris described the intensity of the battle his brigade was engaged in: "Thus from 7 a.m. of the 12th to 3.30 a.m. on May 13 (twenty hours) my men were exposed to a constant and destructive fire, both from front and flank, and during the hours of day to a heavy artillery fire, in which mortars were used by the enemy for the first time during the campaign. A cold, drenching rain fell during the greater portion of the day and night and the trenches were filled with water. Great difficulty was experienced in procuring supplies of ammunition, man after man being shot down while bringing it in... As an instance of the terrible nature of the fire, trees 22 inches in diameter were hewn to splinters and felled by the musketry." Col. Samuel E. Baker and Lt. Col. Abram M. Feltus of the 16th were both killed at the Bloody Angle, along with many soldiers of the Regiment. Edward C. Councill was promoted to colonel to take the place of the commanders killed at Spotsylvania.

After fighting at the Battle of Cold Harbor, Harris's brigade was sent to the defensive lines of Petersburg, Virginia, in June. During the Siege of Petersburg, the 16th Regiment fought in numerous battles in an attempt to cut railroad lines bringing Union troops to the front lines. During the Battle of Globe Tavern, Harris' brigade charged the Union trenches, taking heavy fire and suffering numerous casualties, including Col. E.C. Councill, commander of the 16th Regiment, who died of his wounds. The 16th continued to fight along the Petersburg lines until the final Union breakthrough on April 2, 1865. The 16th Mississippi was among the last defenders of Fort Gregg that day, holding the fortifications against superior numbers to allow the remnants of Robert E. Lee's army to retreat until they were overwhelmed by Union forces. 4 officers and 68 surviving men of the 16th Regiment surrendered after the Union breakthrough at Petersburg. The fall of Petersburg would lead to the final surrender of the Army of Northern Virginia at Appomattox Court House on April 9, 1865.

== Commanders ==
Commanders of the 16th Mississippi Infantry:

- Col. Carnot Posey, promoted to Brigadier General, died of wounds received at Bristoe Station, 1863.
- Col. Samuel E. Baker, killed at Spotsylvania Court House, 1864.
- Col. Edward C. Councill, died of wounds received at Globe Tavern, 1864.
- Lt. Col. Robert Clark
- Lt. Col. J.H. Duncan
- Lt. Col. James J. Shannon
- Lt. Col. Abram M. Feltus, killed at Spotsylvania Court House, 1864.
- Lt. Col. Seneca McNeil Bain, captured at Globe Tavern, 1864.

== Organization ==
Companies of the 16th Mississippi Infantry:

- Company A, "Summit Rifles" of Pike County.
- Company B, "Westville Guards" of Simpson County
- Company C, "Crystal Springs Southern Rights" of Copiah County.
- Company D, "Adams Light Guard (second company)" of Adams County.
- Company E, "Quitman Guards" of Pike County.
- Company F, "Jasper Grays" of Jasper County.
- Company G "Fairview Rifles" of Claiborne County.
- Company H, "Defenders" of Smith County.
- Company I, "Adams Light Guard (first company)" of Adams County.
- Company K, "Wilkinson Rifles" of Wilkinson County

== See also ==
- List of Mississippi Civil War Confederate units
