= St. John's Church at Creagerstown Historic District =

Historic buildings in Maryland, US

- U.S. National Register of Historic Places
- U.S. Historic district
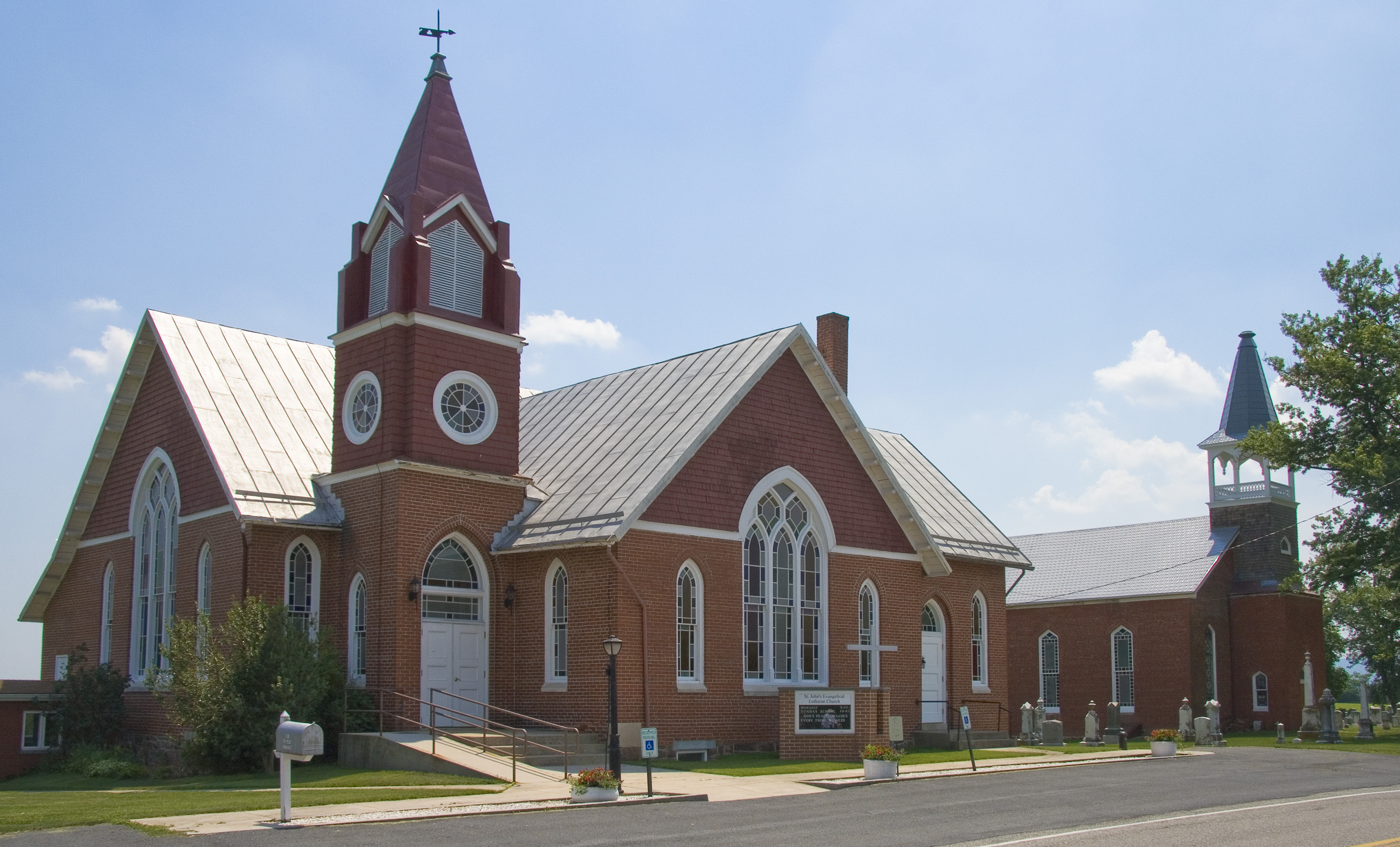

- Location within Maryland Location within the United States
- Location: 8619 Blacks Mill Rd., Thurmont, Maryland
- Coordinates: 39°34′35″N 77°21′49″W
- Area: 3 acres (1.2 ha)
- Built: 1834
- Architectural style: Late Gothic Revival
- NRHP reference No.: 07000862
- Added to NRHP: August 28, 2007

The St. John's Church at Creagerstown Historic District is a national historic district located at Creagerstown, Frederick County, Maryland The district encompasses four contributing buildings and one contributing site, namely:

- Creagerstown School Number 2, now the parish house for St. John's Church (1880) and concrete block privy / shed (c. 1930)
- St. John's Reformed Church (now vacant) (1834)
- St. John's Evangelical Lutheran Church (1908)
- Creagerstown Cemetery

The St. John's Church at Creagerstown Historic District was listed on the National Register of Historic Places in 2007.
