= Strawberry Hill (Creagerstown, Maryland) =

Historic house in Maryland, United States

- U.S. National Register of Historic Places
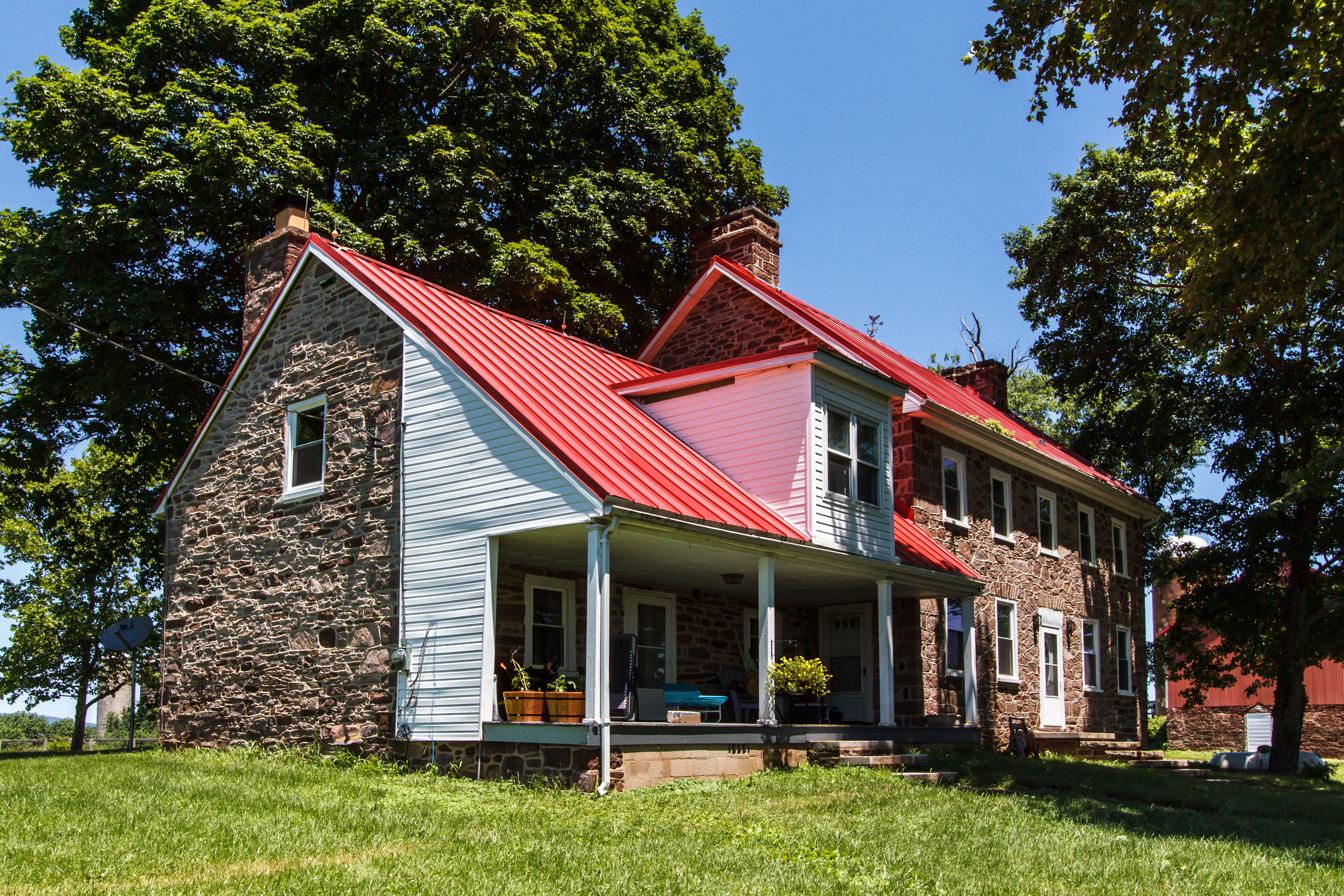

- Location within Maryland Location within the United States
- Location: 12155 Creagerstown Road (MD 550), Creagerstown, Maryland
- Coordinates: 39°34′16″N 77°21′14″W
- Area: 9 acres (3.6 ha)
- Built: 1783
- Architectural style: Georgian
- NRHP reference No.: 76000993
- Added to NRHP: January 30, 1976

Strawberry Hill is a Georgian style farmhouse near Thurmont, Frederick County, Maryland, built in 1783. The house is substantially similar in plan to nearby Pennterra, but lacks Pennterra's later Victorian additions. The locally quarried stone includes an unusual diamond pattern on the southeast side of the house.

Strawberry Hill was listed on the National Register of Historic Places in 1976.
