= Rożnowo, Greater Poland Voivodeship =

Rożnowo
- Village
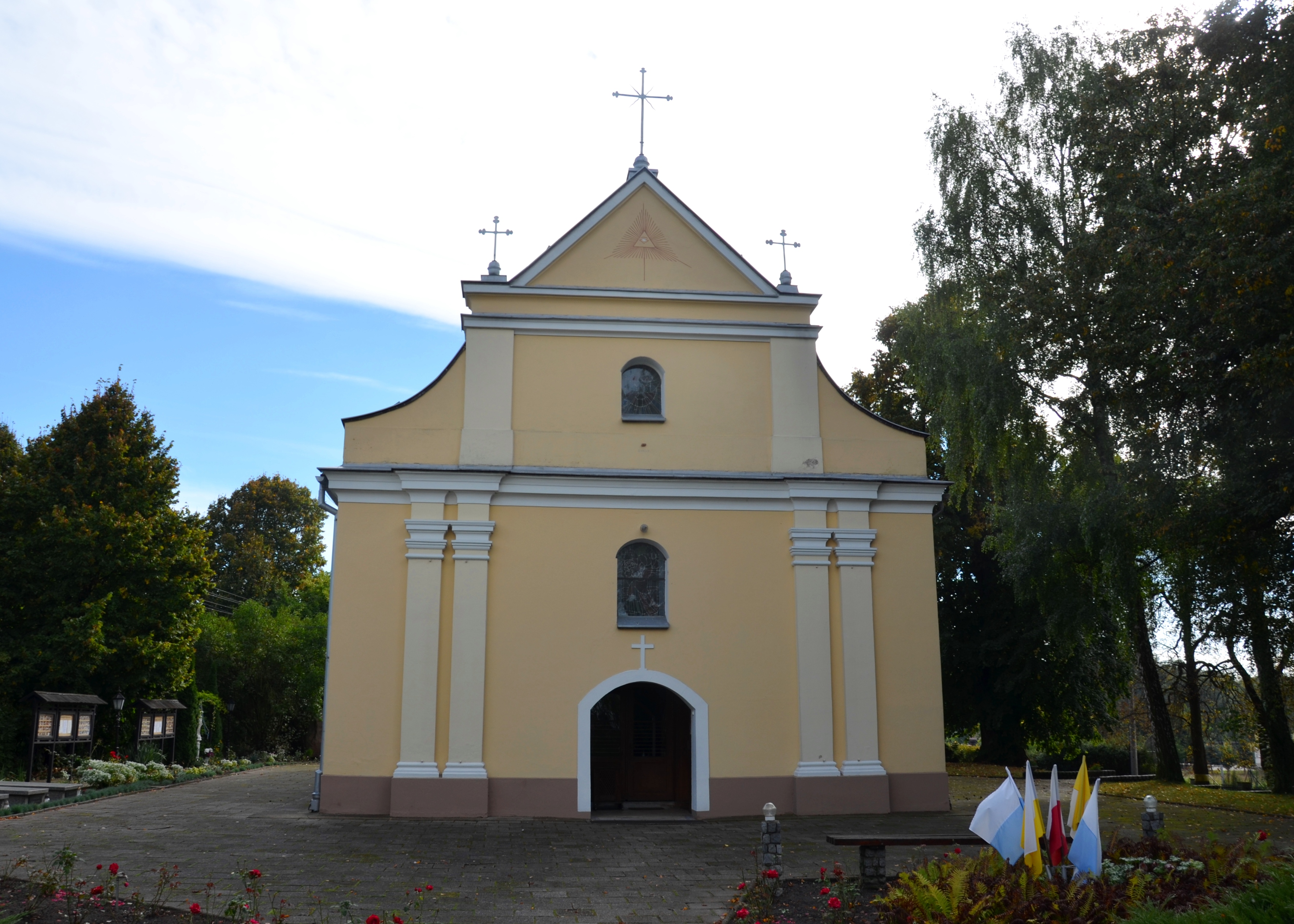
- Saint Catherine church in Rożnowo

- Location within Poland
- Coordinates: 52°40′52″N 16°52′4″E
- Country: Poland
- Voivodeship: Greater Poland
- County: Oborniki
- Gmina: Oborniki
- Population: 1,500

Rożnowo ([rɔʐˈnɔvɔ]; German: Ruschdorf) is a village in the administrative district of Gmina Oborniki, within Oborniki County, Greater Poland Voivodeship, in west-central Poland.

Rożnowo is best known as the birthplace of Włodzimierz Krzyżanowski, a military leader and brigade commander in the Union Army during the American Civil War. He was a first cousin to composer Frédéric Chopin.
