= Nathaniel H. Harris =

Confederate States Army general

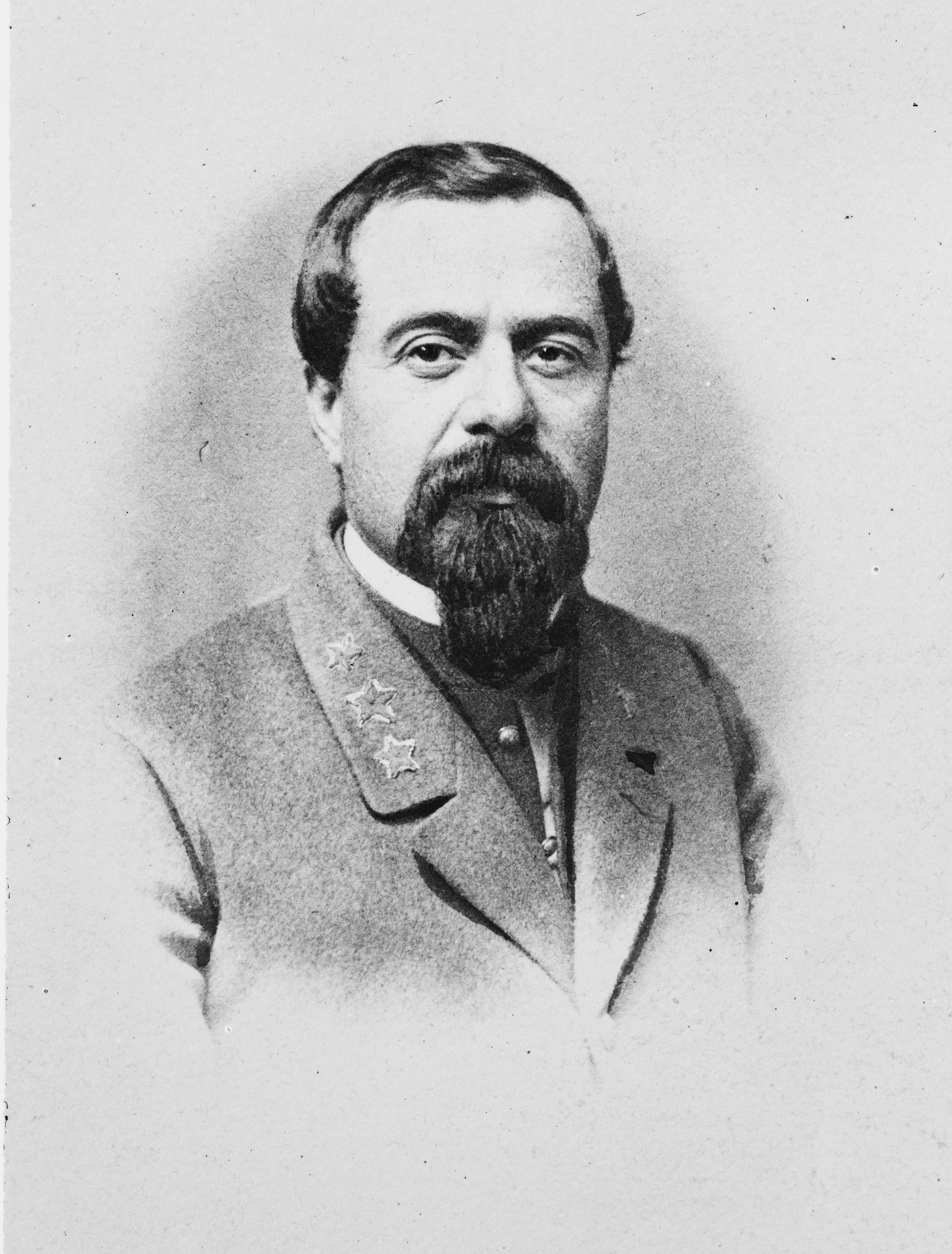
- Harris in uniform, c. 1863
- Born: Nathaniel Harrison Harris; August 22, 1834; Natchez, Mississippi, U.S.
- Died: August 23, 1900 (aged 66); Malvern, England, U.K.
- Burial place: Green-Wood Cemetery, Brooklyn, New York, U.S. 40°39′09.2″N 73°59′27.8″W
- Military career
- Allegiance: Confederate States
- Branch: Army
- Service years: 1861–1865
- Rank: Brigadier-General
- Commands: 19th Mississippi Infantry Regiment; Harris's Brigade; Mahone's Division
- Wars: American Civil War

Brigadier-General Nathaniel Harrison Harris (August 22, 1834 – August 23, 1900) was a senior officer of the Confederate States Army who commanded infantry in the Eastern theater of the American Civil War.

== Early life and education ==
Nathaniel Harrison Harris was born on August 22, 1834, at Natchez, Mississippi. Harris graduated from the University of Louisiana law school (present-day Tulane University Law School) and practiced his profession in Vicksburg, Mississippi. He never married. His brother J. W. N. Harris became a lawyer in Vicksburg, Mississippi in 1852, and Nathaniel Harris joined him in partnership in 1856.

== American Civil War ==
In early 1861, Harris organized a Mississippi militia company called the "Warren Rifles" and was captain of the company on April 25, 1861. On June 1, 1861, the company became Company C of the 19th Mississippi Infantry Regiment. The regiment soon was sent to Virginia, but did not engage in the First Battle of Bull Run or other significant action until the Battle of Williamsburg in the Peninsula Campaign. He was promoted to major on March 5, 1862. His regiment went on to fight in the Battle of Seven Pines and the Seven Days Battles. He was wounded on May 5, 1862, at the Battle of Glendale (Frayser's Farm) on June 30, 1862, and the Second Battle of Bull Run on August 30, 1862. After the Antietam Campaign, He was promoted to lieutenant colonel.

Harris was promoted to colonel and assumed command of the regiment on April 2, 1863. He led the regiment at the Battle of Chancellorsville and the Battle of Gettysburg. He assumed command of Brigadier General Carnot Posey's brigade after Posey was mortally wounded at the Battle of Bristoe Station. Harris was promoted to brigadier general on January 20, 1864. His brigade was assigned to Major General Richard H. Anderson's division, then Major General William Mahone's division in III Corps of the Army of Northern Virginia. Harris's brigade delivered a powerful counterattack in the "Mule Shoe" salient at the Battle of Spotsylvania. He performed distinguished service during the Siege of Petersburg. At the Battle of Globe Tavern, August 21, 1864, over half of Harris's brigade were casualties. In late 1864 and early 1865, Harris's brigade fought along the Weldon Railroad. He again was especially distinguished at the Battles of Fort Gregg and Whitworth at the end of the siege. In March 1865, he commanded the inner defenses of Richmond, Virginia.

Harris was paroled at Appomattox, Virginia on April 9, 1865, where he was in command of Mahone's division and was pardoned on October 19, 1865.

== Later life ==
After the Civil War, Harris resumed his law practice at Vicksburg, Mississippi. He became president of the Mississippi Valley and Ship Island Railroad. For a time, he was register of the U.S. Land Office in Aberdeen, South Dakota. In 1890, he moved to California, where he became a successful businessman in partnership with mining engineer, John Hays Hammond. He died on August 23, 1900, in Malvern, Worcestershire, England, while on a business trip. His remains were cremated and later buried at Green-Wood Cemetery, Brooklyn, New York.

== Legacy ==
The unincorporated community of Harriston in Jefferson County, Mississippi, is named for Harris.

== See also ==
- List of Confederate States Army generals
