= Pennterra (Creagerstown, Maryland) =

Historic house in Maryland, United States

- U.S. National Register of Historic Places
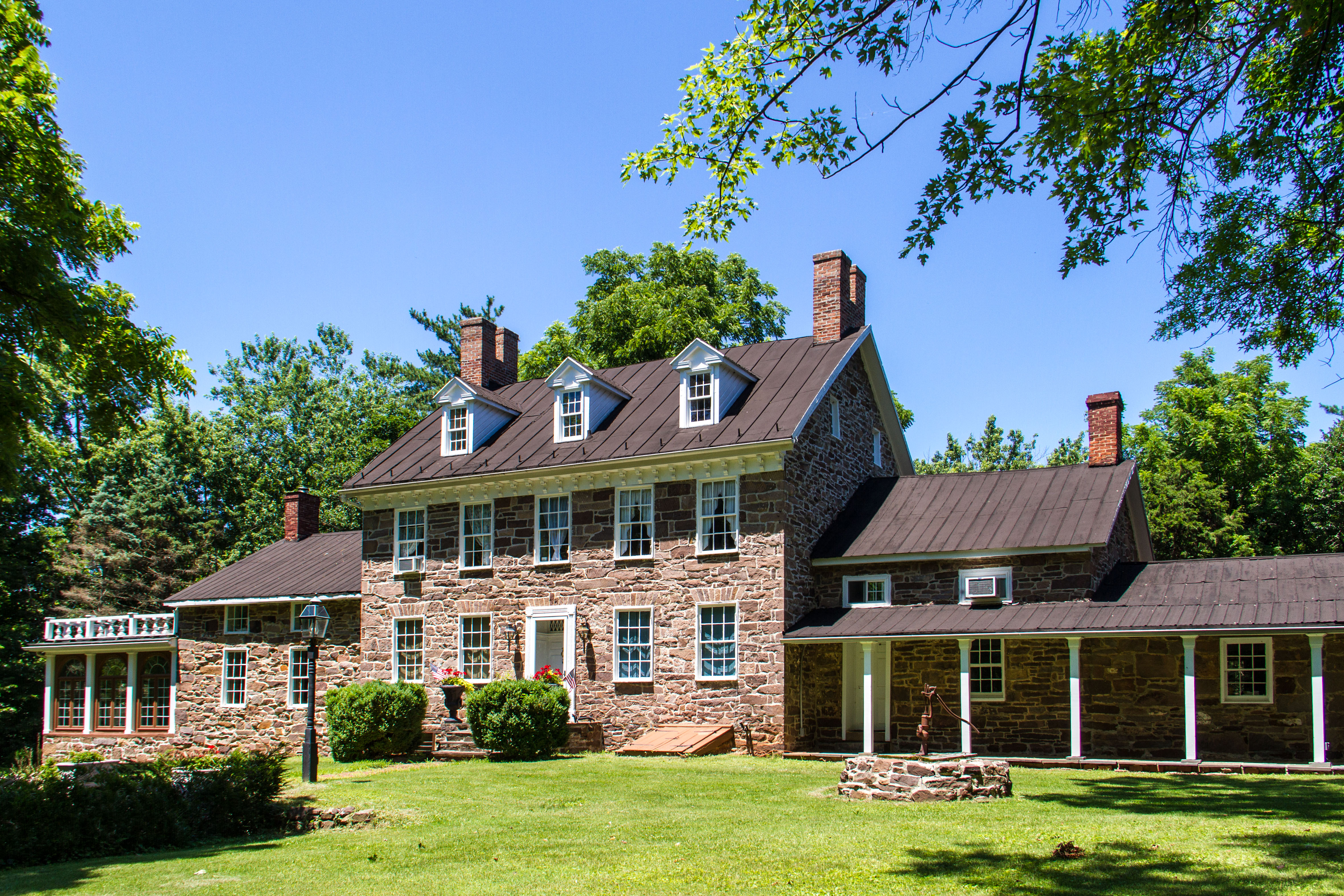

- Location within Maryland Location within the United States
- Location: 12003 Penterra Manor Lane (MD 814), Creagerstown, Maryland
- Coordinates: 39°33′59″N 77°20′41″W
- Area: 5 acres (2.0 ha)
- Built: 1783
- Architectural style: Georgian
- NRHP reference No.: 76000992
- Added to NRHP: January 30, 1976

Pennterra is a Georgian farmhouse near Thurmont, Maryland. The house is notable for its locally quarried stonework and its unusually fine proportions. The house was built at about the same time as nearby Strawberry Hill, which was built in 1783.

It was listed on the National Register of Historic Places in 1976.
