= John Beaver House =

Historic house in Virginia, United States

- U.S. National Register of Historic Places
- Virginia Landmarks Register
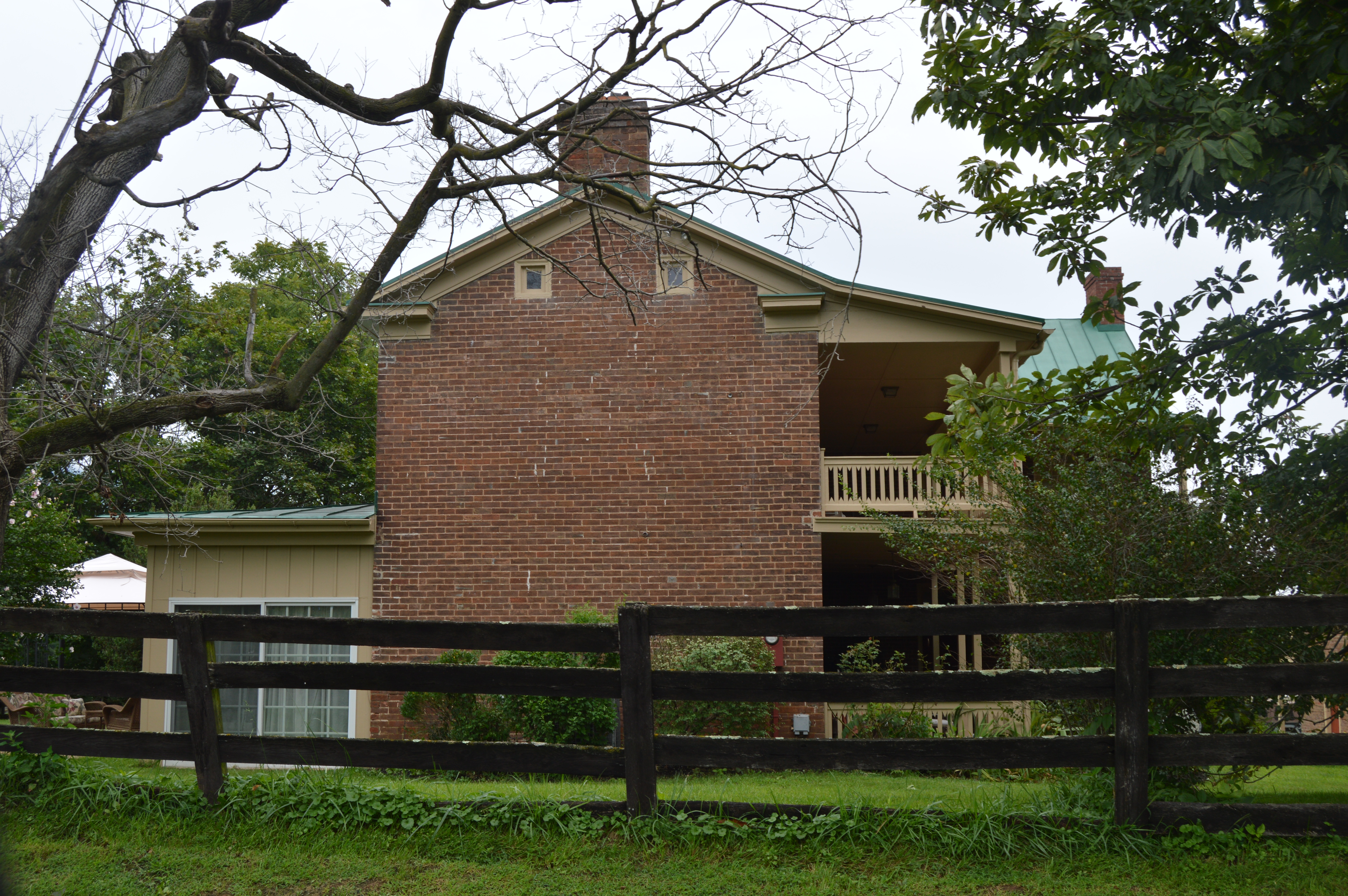
- Front of the house

- Location within Virginia Location within the United States
- Location: N of Stanley on VA 615, near Salem, Virginia
- Coordinates: 38°37′48″N 78°33′47″W
- Area: 3 acres (1.2 ha)
- Built: 1825-1826
- Built by: John Beaver
- NRHP reference No.: 79003065
- VLR No.: 069-0120

Significant dates
- Added to NRHP: June 22, 1979
- Designated VLR: March 20, 1979

John Beaver House, also known as the Thomas Shirley House, is a historic home located near Salem, Page County, Virginia. It was built in 1825–1826, and is a two-story, four-bay, single pile brick dwelling. It has two entryways, a three-course molded brick cornice under the eaves of the gable roof, and exterior end chimneys. A two-story, five-bay kitchen/dining room ell was added in the late-19th century.

It was listed on the National Register of Historic Places in 1979.

== Description ==
The home is set among the rolling farmlands of Massanutten Old Fields near the Shenandoah River in Page County. The original section was erected in 1825–6 by John Beaver; the ell was added in the late 19th century. The original portion of the structure is a two-story, four-bay, single-pile building built of brick laid in Flemish bond on the facade, with five-course American bond on the ends. A three-course molded brick cornice embellishes the eaves of the gable roof and exterior end chimneys flank the ends of the house. The facade is symmetrical with a pair of front doors flanked by 9/6 windows in the first story and with four 6/6 windows in the floor. All of the facade windows are embellished with gauged jack arches. In the center between the two pairs of openings is a tall diaper pattern formed of glazed headers.
