= Monocacy, Maryland =

- Former Village
- The former village of Monocacy was located near present-day Creagerstown in Frederick County, Maryland
- Country: United States
- State: Maryland
- County: Frederick
- First Settled: Between 1725–1730
- Founder: German settlers

Monocacy was a village in Frederick County, Maryland that was located along an old Indian trail known as the Monocacy Trail that ran parallel to the Monocacy River. The trail was known as the Great Wagon Road by colonial travelers; it went to Philadelphia, Pennsylvania and later was renamed Monocacy Road. Early surviving historical records indicate that Monocacy was the oldest settlement in Western Maryland. The town is believed to have been located near present-day Creagerstown, but never has been precisely located after its complete abandonment in the early 19th century. There are signs of the town's existence going back as far as 1730.

== History ==
From the earliest historical records, Monocacy, Maryland is considered the oldest settlement in Western Maryland founded in the 1720s. The town was settled near the Monocacy Trail, an old Indian trail that ran along the Monocacy River.

According to some sources the name of Monocacy was not linked to a definitive town but to the settlement area of the Monocacy Valley where Moravian Germans coming from the colony of Pennsylvania had arrived. If Monocacy was referring to the valley of the same name, it encompassed the region of 18th century Frederick County, Maryland settlements, which included Frederick Town founded in 1745.

The earliest Monocacy settlement that was recorded most likely existed between 1721 and 1732 and was composed of European-American traders from the colony of Maryland who ran a trading post and who co-existed with the local Native American tribes in Frederick County, Maryland.

In 1729, German settlers arrived in what later became Frederick County in 1748 then a part of the British colonial Province of Maryland. The first settlement created by the settlers of the county was Monocacy, which was founded between 1725 and 1730, making it the oldest settlement in Western Maryland. The town was settled nearby the Monocacy Trail, an old Indian trail that ran along the Monocacy River. In 1730, the Monocacy Trail was made into a wagon road. In its early days, Monocacy was the main settlement within the region of early Frederick County. The early dominance of the town of Monocacy or the other Monocacy settlements in the Monocacy Valley eventually was overtaken by the later founding and rapid growth of Frederick Town, now present-day Frederick, Maryland.

Other sources state that between 1732 and 1734, a church known as "the Log church" was built in what may have been the single town site of the early German settlement of Monocacy. Moravian Church missionaries visited the area regularly, and many of the people of "Manakasy," referring to the Native American tribe as the Moravians spelled it in their records, often visited the Maryland Moravian Settlements from nearby Pennsylvania.

By the time the log church was built, the village of Monocacy was somewhat important to the area. The town had a number of taverns and other places to sleep. "As late as 1747, it possessed accommodations better than those of Frederick." Sometime between 1760 and 1770, the nearby town of Creagerstown supplanted Monocacy because it was a better location for a town, being at the crossroads of a number of early Maryland roads, which gave easier access for stagecoach travelers and enabled town growth. By 1808, Monocacy Road was macadamized creating a more reliable heavily traveled highway.

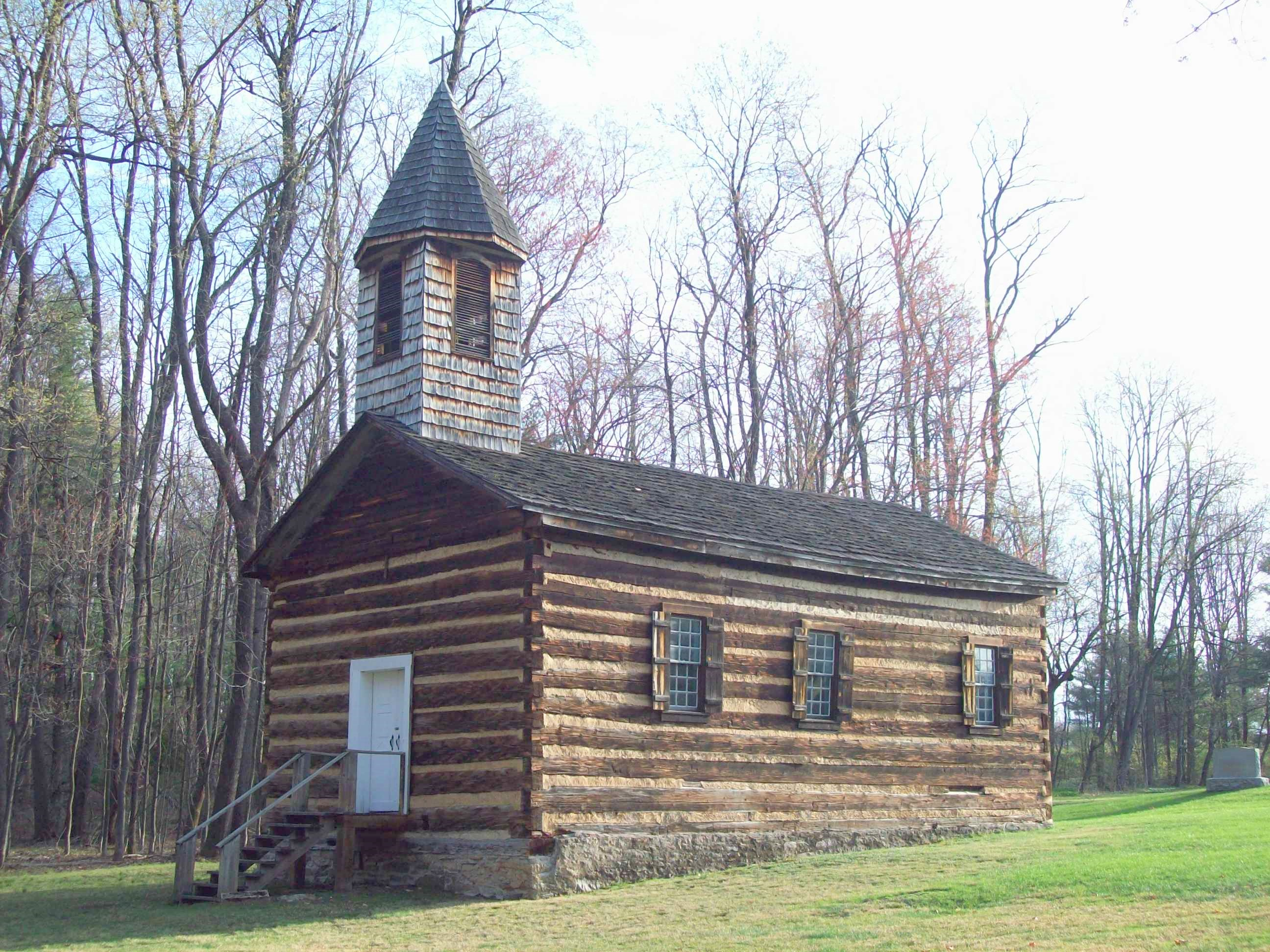
Between 1732 and 1734, "the Log church" in Monocacy was built then a part of the British colonial Province of Maryland and was a regular destination for Moravian missionaries from the Province of Pennsylvania. It has been alleged by an 1896 account that Creagerstown, Maryland was built on the former site of the old log church. The Monocacy log church may have looked similar to this early structure in Pennsylvania.

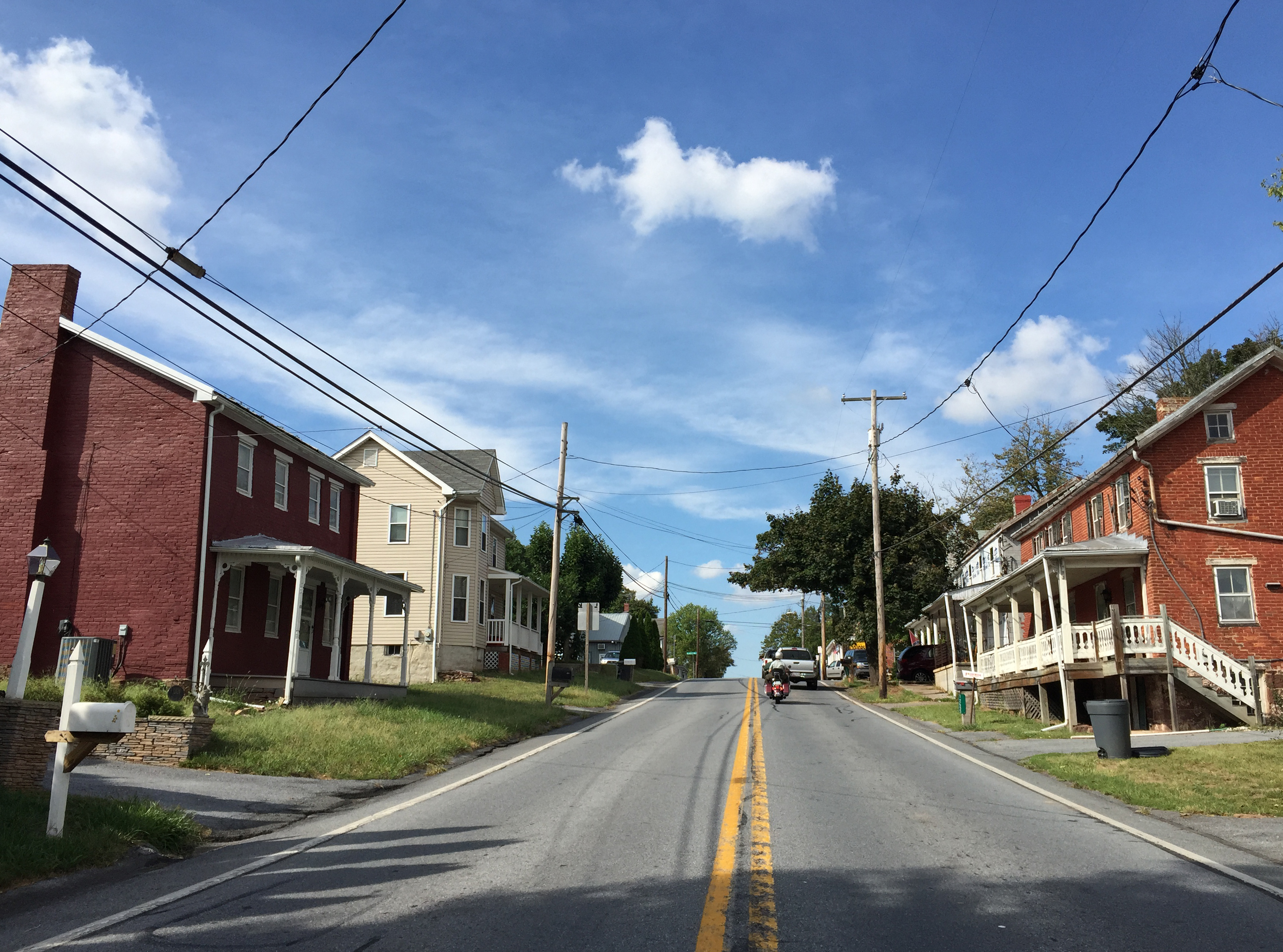
Creagerstown, Maryland was alleged according to an 1896 source to have been built on the former site of the old log church in Monocacy. Photo from 2016

== Search for town site ==
As early as 1896, knowledge of the location of the town had been lost. In 1896, Rev. George A. Whitmore, a resident of Thurmont, wrote upon interviewing two residents of Creagerstown who were in "bordering on 80 years" about the location of the Log Church, he had been told that Creagerstown was built on the old location of the church. Whitmore mentions that one of the people he interviewed, Mr. W.L. Grimes Sr., actually helped tear down the Log church so that the new church could be built in its place.

Whitmore goes on to say that traditional lore states though that the town of Monocacy was located to the southeast of Creagerstown, at the intersection of Monocacy Road and Poe's Ford, near by Hunting Creek. Both Whitmore and his contemporary Mr. Schultz investigated the site and found flat land with a few dwellings. In a history of Frederick County, Mr. Schultz is quoted as saying that the location to the southeast of Creagerstown "agrees in every particular with the data that we have heretofore been able to obtain and I therefore believe that the few old houses and the graveyard are all perhaps that remain of the ancient village of Monocacy."

In the late 1960s, Charlotte Hearthly, then a senior in high school, mounted a search for the site. Many locals believe that their land parcels were the site of Monocacy. Much of the evidence for where Monocacy is located has been destroyed. Spencer Geasey speaks of a location where there was a school, a cemetery, and some other log buildings. He states that the area was developed and that a dig in this location would not prove useful.

There is no doubt that the town existed. In August 1756, George Washington mentions Monocacy in a letter. Two different riding ministers both wrote about the log church at different times. They were riding trails about 10 miles north of Frederick. During the French and Indian War, the site was mentioned in the Maryland Gazette. In 1729, a complaint was filed by a Mr. Carroll with the Pennsylvania government that referenced Monocacy. The complaint was filed because the area was under dispute by Maryland and Pennsylvania.

The town was located near Creagerstown and Jimtown. According to Paul Gordon, one expert has stated that the Sebastian Derr house may have been a church and might be the old site of Monocacy.

The site of Monocacy never has been conclusively located. There is a lot of evidence that the settlement existed, but not an enough tangible evidence as to where the town was actually located.

== In the media ==
In 1999, a documentary film about the region, titled Monocacy, chronicles the history and pre-history of the area and the town. The documentary was produced by Chris Haugh for GS Communications.

== See also ==
- Creagerstown, Maryland
- List of ghost towns in Maryland
