= Włodzimierz Krzyżanowski =

Polish-American engineer and army officer

- Włodzimierz Krzyżanowski
- Born: Włodzimierz Bonawentura Krzyżanowski; July 8, 1824; Rożnowo, Poznań, Prussia
- Died: January 31, 1887 (aged 62); New York City, United States
- Burial place: Arlington National Cemetery
- Relatives: cousin of Frédéric Chopin
- Military career
- Allegiance: United States (Union)
- Branch: United States Army; Union Army
- Service years: 1861–1865
- Rank: Colonel; Brevet Brigadier General; Brigadier General (temporary)
- Nickname: Kriz
- Units: Army of the Potomac; Army of the Cumberland
- Commands: Polish Legion Krzyżanowski's Brigade, XI Corps
- Conflicts: 1846 Polish Uprising; American Civil War; Battle of Cross Keys; Second Battle of Bull Run; Battle of Fredericksburg; Battle of Chancellorsville; Battle of Gettysburg; Chattanooga campaign; Franklin-Nashville Campaign
- Other work: Civil Engineer, Military Territorial Administrator, Treasury Department Clerk, Customs Agent

Włodzimierz Bonawentura Krzyżanowski ([vwɔˈd͡ʑimjɛʂ kʂɨʐaˈnɔfski]; in some sources, misspelled Wladimir Krzyzanowski; 8 July 1824 – 31 January 1887) was a Polish-American engineer, politician, and brigadier general in the Union Army.

A Polish noble, he took part in the 1846 uprising against Prussia and left Poland after the uprising's suppression. During the American Civil War he enlisted in the United States' Union Army, recruited a company of Polish immigrants, and became colonel of the 58th New York Volunteer Infantry Regiment, listed in the official Army Register as the "Polish Legion".

In the July 1863 Battle of Gettysburg, Krzyżanowski helped repel an evening assault by the famed Louisiana Tigers on the Union defenses atop East Cemetery Hill.

After the war he held several government posts, though it is disputed whether he was, as has often been stated, the first American administrator of Alaska Territory.

== Early life ==
Krzyżanowski was born in Rożnowo, Grand Duchy of Poznań, into an old Polish noble family that bore the Świnka coat of arms, and whose roots reached back to the 14th century and ownership of the village of Krzyżanowo near Kościan. Krzyżanowski's father and both uncles had fought for Polish independence under Napoleon's banners, and his brother fought in the November 1830 Uprising.

Krzyżanowski was first cousin to Frédéric Chopin, whose mother Justyna Krzyżanowska's brother was Włodzimierz Krzyżanowski's father.

After the death of Krzyżanowski's father, the family fell into debt and had to leave their estate. The mother sent Włodzimierz to relatives in Poznań, while the rest of the family moved to Warsaw. Young Krzyżanowski attended St. Mary Magdalen Gymnasium in Poznań, a principal center of the Polish nationalist underground in Prussian Poland.

Krzyżanowski took part in the 1846 uprising against Prussia and, after its suppression, fled Poland to avoid arrest. He went to the Free City of Hamburg, from which he sailed to New York, eventually arriving on January 25, 1847. In the United States he learned the English language and continued his education.

After completing his education, Krzyżanowski worked as a civil engineer and surveyor in Virginia and was instrumental in pushing America's railroads west. There he made the acquaintance of General Burnett and married his daughter Caroline, with whom he moved to Washington, D.C., to set up his own company, which brought him substantial wealth. He also became active in Republican Party politics. In 1860 he supported Abraham Lincoln's candidacy for president of the United States.

== Civil War ==
In Washington, D.C., in early 1861, Krzyżanowski enlisted as a private two days after President Abraham Lincoln called for volunteers. Krzyżanowski recruited a company of Polish immigrants, one of the first companies of Union soldiers. He moved the company to New York City, enlisted more immigrants, and soon became colonel of the 58th New York Volunteer Infantry Regiment, listed in the official Army Register as the "Polish Legion".

Krzyżanowski participated in the battles of Cross Keys in the Shenandoah Valley, and Second Bull Run (Second Manassas), where he was injured when his horse fell, Chancellorsville, where his brigade and the corps they were part of were routed by a Confederate flank attack, and Gettysburg in the Eastern Theater.

President Lincoln appointed Krzyżanowski brigadier general on November 26, 1862. The appointment expired by law on March 4, 1863, because the U.S. Senate failed to confirm the promotion. The Senate belatedly approved the appointment on March 9, 1863, but recalled it March 11, 1863, returned it to President Lincoln on March 12, 1863, and tabled it on March 13, 1863, keeping the expiration of the appointment in effect.

At Gettysburg on 1 July 1863 his men were pushed back through the town as the Union XI Corps retreated. During this action, Krzyżanowski was injured when his horse stumbled. However, next day he led a counterattack on Cemetery Hill that helped stabilize the faltering Union line.

Later in the year, the XI Corps was sent to the Western Theater to help raise the Confederate siege of Chattanooga. Krzyżanowski played a role in the Battle of Wauhatchie, where he followed Maj. Gen. Joseph Hooker's orders very literally, and was present at the Battle of Missionary Ridge.

When the XI Corps was dissolved, much of it being added to XX Corps, Krzyżanowski was assigned to command at Bridgeport, Alabama, to guard the Nashville and Chattanooga Railroad, and later to Stevenson, Alabama, both commands within the Department of the Cumberland. He also commanded the 3rd Brigade of the Defenses of the Nashville & Chattanooga Railroad, reporting to Maj. Gen. Robert H. Milroy.

On 2 March 1865 President Lincoln nominated Krzyżanowski for appointment to the grade of brevet brigadier general of volunteers, to rank from 2 March 1865. The U.S. Senate confirmed the appointment on 9 March 1865. Krzyżanowski was mustered out of the volunteers on 1 October 1865.

== Postbellum ==
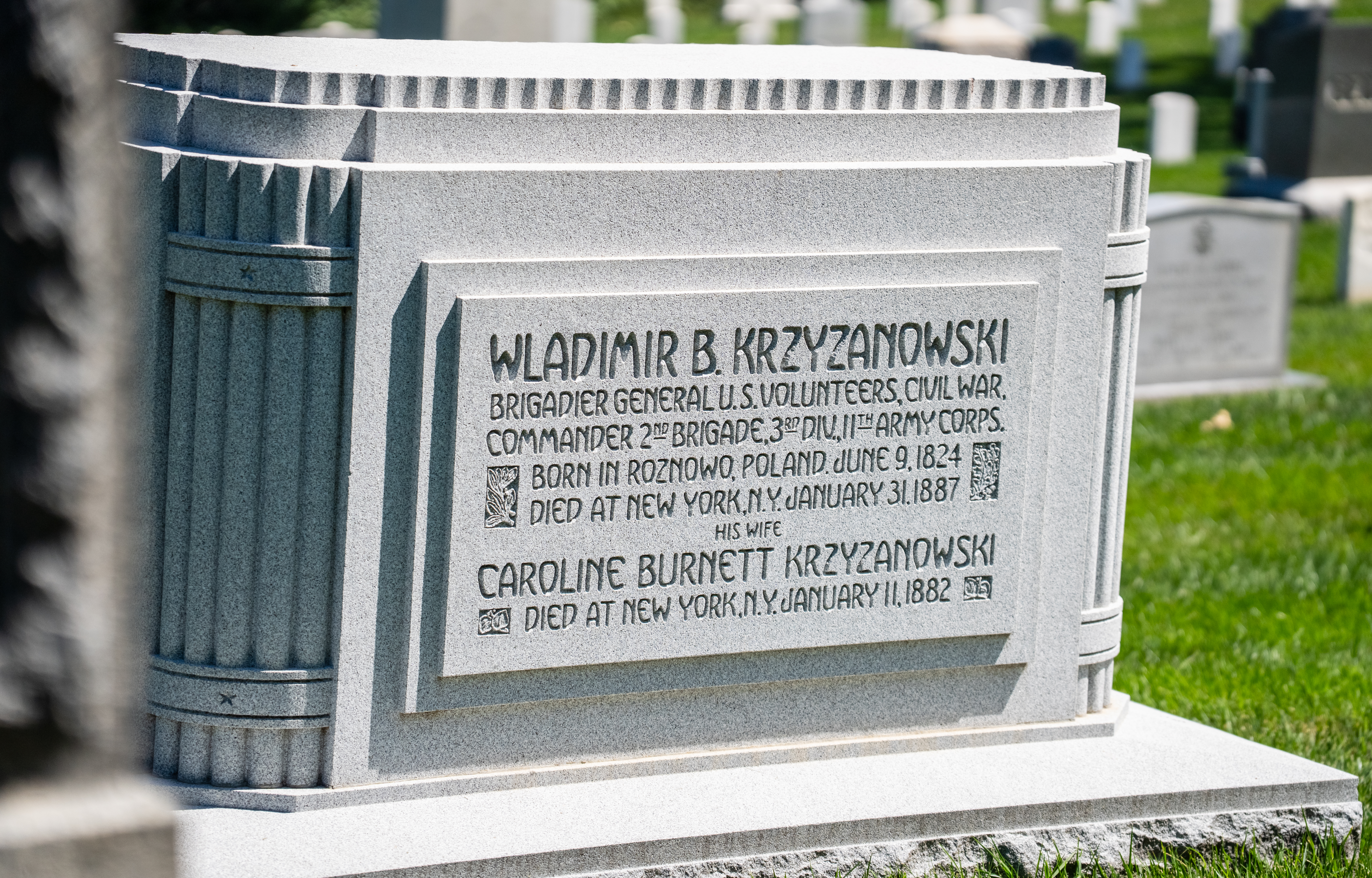
Grave of Brevet Brigadier General Wlodzimierz Krzyzanowski in Section 1 of Arlington National Cemetery, Arlington, Virginia in 2026

After the war, Krzyżanowski was given governing duties in Alabama. He later served as the appointed governor of Georgia. Supposedly he also served as the first American administrator of the Alaska Territory. However, the Anchorage Daily News was unable to find conclusive information to support or disprove this claim. It is said that the supposed posting was a reward for his services as personal representative of Secretary William H. Seward during the negotiations for the purchase of Alaska.

He served in the U.S. Treasury Department and later in the customs service in Panama and New York.

Krzyżanowski died in New York City. On 13 October 1937, the 50th anniversary of his death, his remains were transferred with military honors from Green-Wood Cemetery in Brooklyn, New York, to Arlington National Cemetery. President Franklin D. Roosevelt broadcast a nationwide tribute via radio, and Poland's president, Ignacy Mościcki, transmitted his from Warsaw.

== Legacy ==
Krzyżanowski's legacy was honored by the American Polish Civil War Centennial Committee during the 1960s, which lobbied politicians for a greater appreciation of his remembrance. Thomas J. Lane pushed for House Joint Resolution 707, which would have made 9 July 1962 "Gen. Kryzanowski Memorial Day". The resolution did not, however, receive sufficient support from Congress.

== See also ==
- List of American Civil War brevet generals (Union)
