= Salem, Page County, Virginia =

Unincorporated community in Virginia, US

Coordinates: 38°38′39″N 78°32′52″W

Salem, Page County is an unincorporated community in Page County, in the U.S. state of Virginia.

The John Beaver House was listed on the National Register of Historic Places in 1979.
