= Creagerstown, Maryland =

Unincorporated community in Maryland, United States

- Unincorporated community
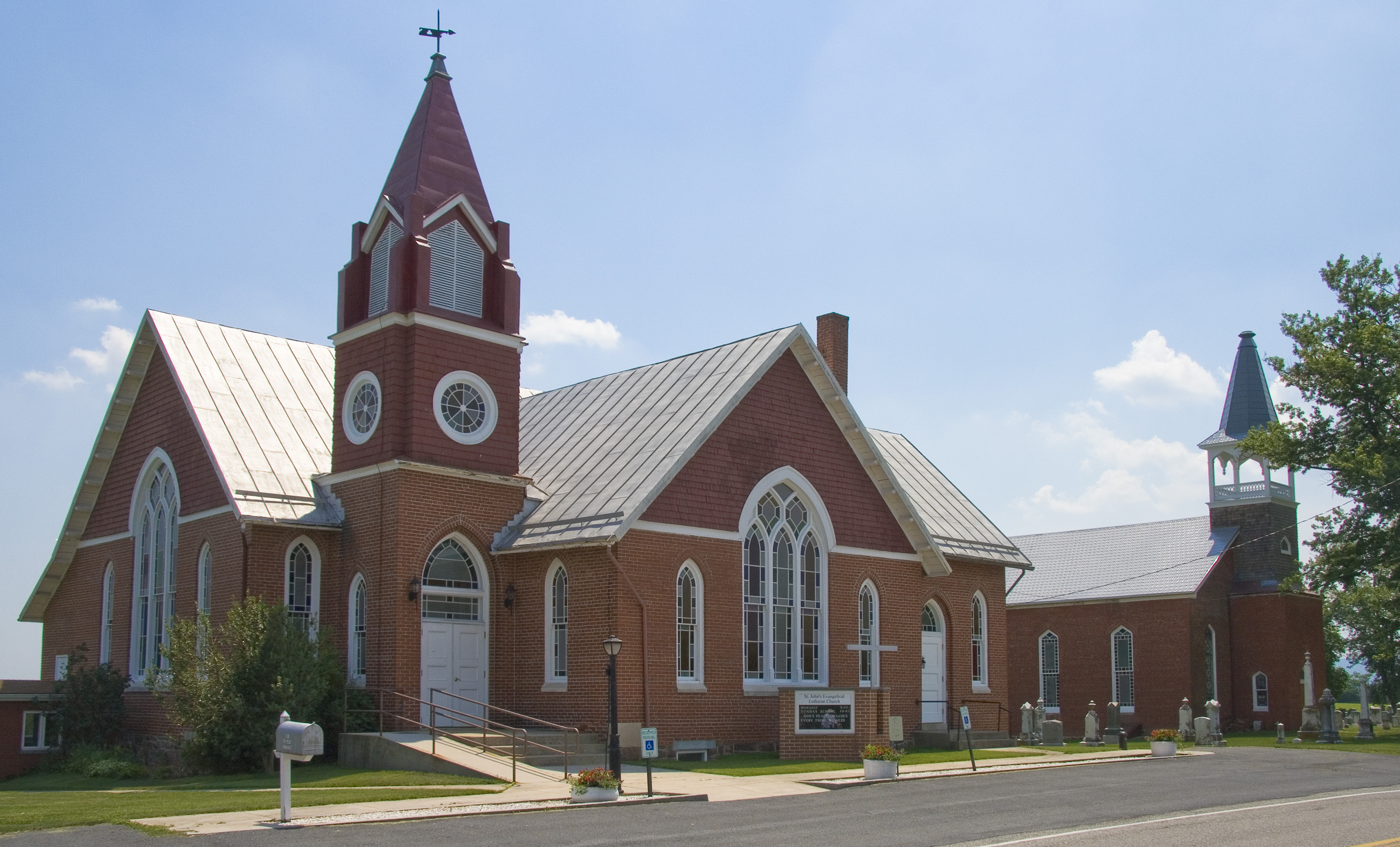
- St. John's Church in Creagerstown

- Location within Maryland
- Coordinates: 39°34′38″N 77°21′54″W
- Country: United States
- State: Maryland
- County: Frederick
- First Settled: 1750
- Founded by: Creager Family
- Elevation: 410 ft (120 m)
- GNIS feature ID: 590041

Creagerstown is an unincorporated community in Frederick County, Maryland, United States. It is playfully known by its residents as "4 miles from everywhere" because of its situation at 4 miles (6.4 km) from Thurmont, Woodsboro, Rocky Ridge, and Lewistown.

The town consists of about 40 buildings, including three churches and a small school building. A number of the buildings in the town can be classified as historical and the ruins of older buildings can also be found.

Creagerstown is additionally the home to both Creagerstown Park and Creagerstown Cemetery. Maryland Route 550 passes through Creagerstown on its way towards Loys Station in the form of Creagerstown Road.

== History ==
=== Founding ===
The town originally grew up as an important crossroads for stagecoaches around a major Indian trail known as the Monocacy Road. The Monocacy Road connected the area to Pennsylvania and Virginia. Creagerstown is located at a crossroads where the Monocacy Road connected to another road that ran between Baltimore and Pittsburgh. The earliest settlement of the area was in the early 1700s by German immigrants. Sometime between 1760 and 1770, John Creager laid out Creagerstown, which would eventually supplant nearby Monocacy.

=== Growth ===
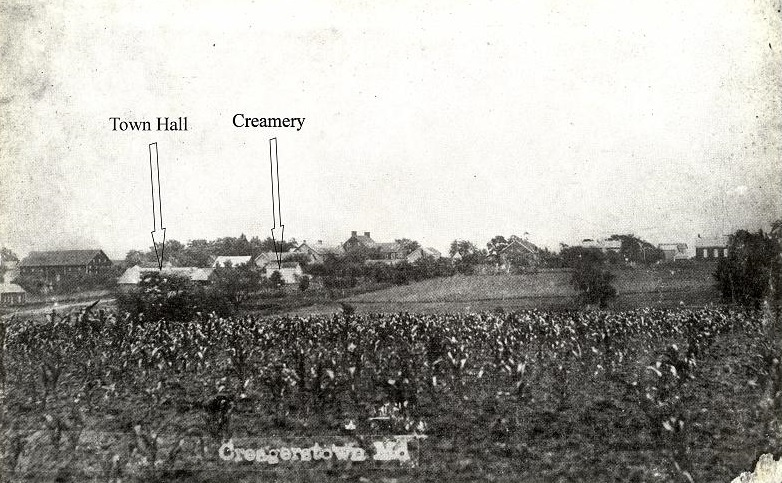
Creagerstown before the 1914 fire.

The town experienced steady growth for a number of years. In 1775, the first house in Creagerstown was built by Isaac Kolb. In 1785, a tannery opened in town; it would operate until 1810. Around the same time that the tannery closed, a German brewery opened in Creagerstown. In 1866, the church from Monocacy was reconstructed in Creagerstown and became known as Union Bethel Church. By 1858 Creagerstown contained a doctor's office, two stores, a hotel, a church, a parsonage, and a school. Growing further by 1873, Creagerstown also contained a blacksmith shop, a wagon shop, and another church. By 1910, the population of Creagerstown was 200. At one point, there was a tavern on every corner in the town square.

=== Fire of June 2, 1914 ===
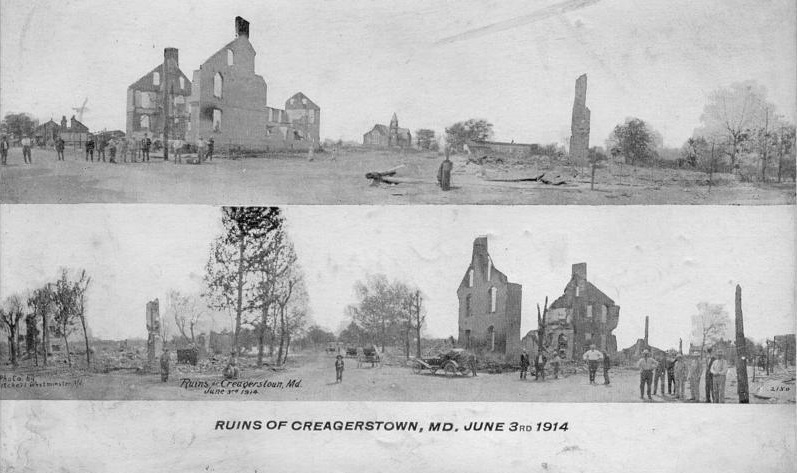
Postcard from 1914 showing the destruction caused by the fire.

On June 2, 1914, around 10 am, a major fire broke out in Monocacy Valley Creamery and destroyed about 30 buildings, causing somewhere between $60,000 and $70,000 worth of damages. The fire was caused accidentally when a spark from a fire set by a man in the creamery ignited the roof. Strong winds fanned the flames, allowing the blaze to cross the road and gaps between buildings. Creagerstown had no fire department to put out the fire. The town hall was burned down and the fire also destroyed all of the hotels owned by the Valentine family, though the Valley Hotel was eventually rebuilt. Between 1920 and 1930 a number of houses in the town were reconstructed. But by 1930 other road improvements and other highways, such as the Frederick and Emmitsburg railroads, had been constructed throughout Frederick and Creagerstown never recovered.

== Historical buildings ==
Most of the buildings in Creagerstown were built between the early 19th century and early 20th century and are made out of log, brick, or stone. The Maryland State Historic Sites Inventory Form for Creagerstown states that "the town demonstrates building forms spanning over 100 years." Many of the houses have smaller agricultural buildings in the back of their lots. Most of the commercial buildings are located towards the center of the town.

There are a number of notable historical buildings in Creagerstown including the Georgian-style farmhouse Strawberry Hill which is located on Creagerstown Road and is not in the town proper, but is located in the Creagerstown Election District. Along with Pennterra, Strawberry Hill was listed on the National Register of Historic Places in 1976. St. John's Church, built in 1908 and located on Blacks Mill Rd, is also in Creagerstown. St. John's Church was built to replace the original St. John's Lutheran Church which was built in the 1850s. Still standing in the town is a small schoolhouse, built in 1855, and the Union Bethel church, a one-story stone church built in 1866.

== See also ==
- Monocacy, Maryland
