= George von Amsberg =

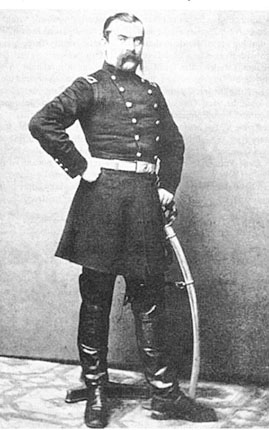
- Born: June 24, 1821; Hildesheim
- Died: November 21, 1876 (aged 55); Hoboken, New Jersey, U.S.

Georg von Amsberg (June 24, 1821 – November 21, 1876) was a German, who served in Austria, Hungary, and the United States as a military officer in both the Hungarian revolution of 1848 and the American Civil War. Along with such other figures as Carl Schurz and Franz Sigel, he was among a group of European revolutionaries and emigrants who have been collectively termed "Forty-Eighters", a number of whom served prominently in the Union Army.

== Early years ==
Georg von Amsberg was born in Hildesheim near Hannover, where he was educated at the Polytechnic Institute (the precursor to Leibniz University Hannover). Like many Germans after the downfall of the Holy Roman Empire of the German Nation, he joined the Austrian Army in 1837 as a cadet, and advanced rapidly. By 1848 he was a Second Lieutenant in the 8th Hungarian hussar (light cavalry) regiment "Coburg".

== Hungarian Revolution ==
On 28 October 1848 he deserted with his regiment's 8th company from Galicia to join the Hungarian Honvéd Army. On the 23rd he got promoted to the rank of First Lieutenant and a couple of days later he became a Captain of a company in the 16th Hussar Regiment "Károlyi". On 21 April he got transferred to the 7th Hussar Regiment "Reuss-Köstritz" and became an Aide-de-Camp to Lieutenant General Henryk Dembiński. From mid July he was the Captain of a company in Major General Károly Knezich's "scout corps" in Tokaj. On 3 August he got assigned with his unit to the I. Corps.

After General Görgei's unconditional surrender at Világos on 13 August, Amsberg tried to hide from the Austrian authorities, and with the help of some friendly Russian officers, he made it to Lemberg where he got arrested by the Austrians. The court-martial in Arad found him guilty and sentenced him to death, but this was later commuted to 16 years. After 9 years confinement he was released and banished.

== American Civil War ==
After his release von Amsberg emigrated to the United States. He arrived from Bremen in New York City on September 27, 1858, on the ship Husdon. Von Amsberg worked for a time as a riding instructor at the Hoboken Riding School.

Von Amsberg began his U.S. military service as a major in the 5th Regiment New York National Guard Infantry (5th Regiment of Militia of New York City) on May 1, 1861, shortly after the outbreak of the American Civil War. The regiment was a three-month regiment, so von Amsberg was honorably mustered out of the militia with the rest of the regiment on August 7, 1861.

On September 9, 1861, von Amsberg organized the 45th New York Volunteer Infantry Regiment, which he commanded as colonel as of October 7, 1861. He commanded this unit during the Battle of Cross Keys and Battle of Chancellorsville. During the Battle of Gettysburg he assumed command of 1st Brigade, 3rd Division of XI Corps after the death of Major General John F. Reynolds necessitated advancement of the command structure. He tendered his resignation in September or October 1863 and was discharged for disability due to asthma, acute bronchitis and gastritis on January 22, 1864.

== Aftermath ==
After the war, von Amsberg was the proprietor of a hotel. He died on November 21, 1876, at Hoboken, New Jersey. George von Amsberg is buried in Weehawken Cemetery in North Bergen, New Jersey, US.
