= Hunter's Crossroads =

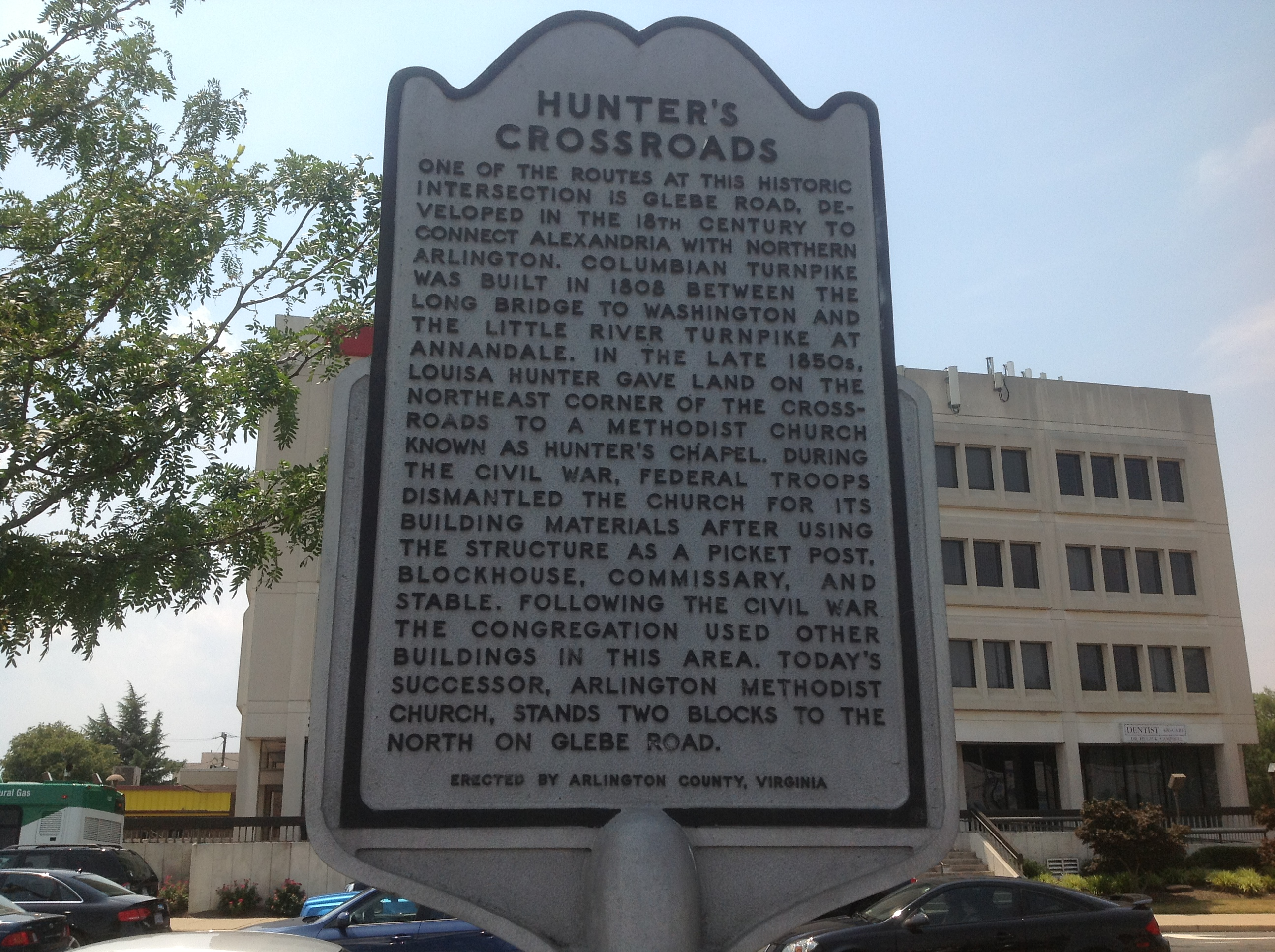
- Hunter's Crossroads Historical Marker
- Interactive map of Hunter's Crossroads
- Location: Arlington, Virginia
- Coordinates: 38°51′39″N 77°05′31″W
- Area: Columbia Pike
- Built: 1808
- Governing body: Arlington County Board of Supervisors

Hunter's Crossroads is an historic intersection in Arlington County, Virginia.

== Location ==
Hunter's Crossroads is formed by the junction of Glebe Road, (State Route 120, SR 120) connecting U.S. Route 1 (US 1) in the southern part of Arlington County with SR 123 at the Chain Bridge in the northern end of the county and SR 244 (Columbia Pike) connecting the Pentagon and Washington, D.C., with Annandale, Virginia.

== History ==
Glebe Road was a colonial road that connected the glebe lands of the Anglican Church's Fairfax Parish to the port of Alexandria, Virginia. In 1808, the Columbian Pike was built. It connected the Little River Turnpike in nearby Fairfax County, Virginia to the Long Bridge that crossed the Potomac River in Washington, D.C. Hunter's Crossroads was in the District of Columbia until the Virginia portion was retroceded to Virginia in 1846 and formed Alexandria County.

In the 1850s, Louisa Hunter gave land located at this crossroads to create Hunter's Chapel, part of the Methodist Church. During the Civil War, the church was used by the Union Army as the turnpike was considered strategically significant. Ultimately, the church was destroyed by the army.

== Today ==
The intersection of the two state roads is controlled by traffic signals. The area is densely populated with retail and banking structures on all four corners.
