= Carnot Posey =

Confederate Army officer in the American Civil War

Brigadier-General Carnot Posey
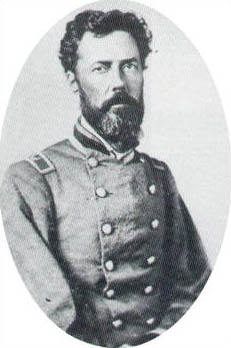
- Portrait of Brigadier-General Posey
- Born: August 5, 1818; Wilkinson County, Mississippi
- Died: November 13, 1863 (aged 45); Charlottesville, Virginia
- Burial place: University of Virginia Cemetery; Charlottesville, Virginia
- Military career
- Allegiance: United States (Confederate States of America) Confederate States
- Branch: United States Army; Confederate States Army
- Service years: 1846–1848 (USA); 1861–1863 (CSA)
- Rank: Captain (Militia); Brigadier-General (CSA)
- Conflicts: Mexican–American War; American Civil War

Carnot Posey (August 5, 1818 – November 13, 1863) was a Mississippi planter and lawyer, and a Confederate general in the American Civil War. He was mortally wounded at the Battle of Bristoe Station.

He was transported for care to the University of Virginia, where he had gone to law school. The residential rooms bordering the Lawn were all serving as Confederate hospital rooms. Posey was placed in Room 33 West Lawn, where he had lived as a student. He died there of his wounds one month after the battle.

== Early life and family ==
Posey was born near Woodville, Mississippi, the fourth of eight children of planter John Brooke Posey and his wife Elizabeth (née Screven) Posey. He attended the common schools and graduated from college in Jackson, Mississippi. He studied law at the University of Virginia.

Afterward he returned to his family's plantation and later established a law practice in Woodville. He married Mary Collins in May 1840. They had two sons before his wife's death four years later.

During the Mexican War, Posey was commissioned as a first lieutenant in the 1st Mississippi Rifles, a volunteer regiment commanded by future Confederate President Jefferson Davis. He fought at the Battle of Buena Vista, where he was wounded.

Returning to Woodville after the war, Posey married Jane White in February 1849. They eventually had six children together. U.S. President James Buchanan appointed Posey as the US district attorney for southern Mississippi. He was in that post when the state seceded from the Union.

== Civil War ==
Posey recruited a local militia company, the Wilkinson Rifles, and enlisted them into Confederate service. He served as their captain from May 21, 1861. They became part of the 16th Mississippi, with Posey being selected as the regiment's first colonel on June 4. He and his men were transferred to the Eastern Theater in August 1861. (Note: Sources, such as Clement A. Evans's Confederate Military History, volume 7, and Mark Boatner's The Civil War Dictionary, place Posey at First Bull Run and Ball's Bluff, but Freeman, vol. 2, p. 419, and Wert, p. 51, note that Posey and his 16th Mississippi were unlikely to have fought in either battle.)

Posey suffered a slight wound at the Battle of Cross Keys in June 1862 during Major General Stonewall Jackson's Valley Campaign. His regiment fought in the Seven Days Battles with the Army of Northern Virginia under General Robert E. Lee. He served as the temporary commander of the brigade of four Mississippi infantry regiments, commanded by Brigadier General Winfield S. Featherston, during the Northern Virginia Campaign and the Maryland Campaign. Posey's regiment fought at Fredericksburg in December 1862, successfully repelling a Union attack.

Posey was promoted to brigadier general on January 18, 1863, to rank from November 2, 1862. The following May, Posey's brigade saw limited action at the Battle of Chancellorsville, maintaining a reserve position at Salem Church. During the army reorganization following Stonewall Jackson's death, Posey's brigade was assigned to Major General Richard H. Anderson's division of the Third (A.P. Hill's) Corps. During the Battle of Gettysburg in July, the brigade was part of Anderson's July 2 attack on Cemetery Ridge, conducting a "feeble, disjointed attack that was repulsed."

At the Battle of Bristoe Station on October 14, 1863, Posey was wounded in the thigh by a shell fragment. Although the wound was not outwardly serious, infection set in. He died a month later in November, in Room 33 West Lawn at the University of Virginia, where he had lived as a law student. He was cared for by a good friend, Dr. John Davis of Charlottesville, Virginia. Posey was buried in the Davis family plot in the University of Virginia Cemetery.

== In memoriam ==
The Carnot Posey Lodge #378 of the Masons was founded in 1875 and named in his memory.

== See also ==
- List of American Civil War generals (Confederate)
