= Battle of the Wilderness order of battle: Confederate =

Confederate States Army units and commanders in the American Civil War

The following Confederate States Army units and commanders fought in the Battle of the Wilderness (May 5–7, 1864) of the American Civil War. The Union order of battle is listed separately. Order of battle compiled from the army organization May 5–6, 1864, the army organization at beginning of the Campaign, the army organization during the Campaign and the reports.

== Abbreviations used ==
=== Military rank ===
- Gen = General
- LTG = Lieutenant General
- MG = Major General
- BG = Brigadier General
- Col = Colonel
- Ltc = Lieutenant Colonel
- Maj = Major
- Cpt = Captain

=== Other ===
- (w) = wounded
- (mw) = mortally wounded
- (k) = killed in action
- (c) = captured

== Army of Northern Virginia ==
Gen Robert E. Lee

General Staff:

- Chief Engineer: MG Martin L. Smith
- Chief of Artillery: BG William N. Pendleton
- Assistant Adjutant General: Ltc Walter H. Taylor
- Aide de Camp: Ltc Charles Marshall
- Aide de Camp: Maj Charles S. Venable

=== First Corps ===
LTG James Longstreet (w)
MG Charles W. Field
MG Richard H. Anderson

Division	Brigade	Regiments and Others
McLaws' (old) Division; BG Joseph B. Kershaw	Kershaw's Brigade Col John D. Kennedy (w); Col John W. Henagan	2nd South Carolina; 3rd South Carolina; 7th South Carolina; 8th South Carolina: Col John W. Henagan; 15th South Carolina; 3rd South Carolina Battalion
McLaws' (old) Division; BG Joseph B. Kershaw	Wofford's Brigade BG William T. Wofford	16th Georgia; 18th Georgia; 24th Georgia; Cobb's (Georgia) Legion; Phillips' (Georgia) Legion; 3rd Georgia Battalion Sharpshooters
McLaws' (old) Division; BG Joseph B. Kershaw	Humphreys' Brigade BG Benjamin G. Humphreys	13th Mississippi; 17th Mississippi; 18th Mississippi; 21st Mississippi
McLaws' (old) Division; BG Joseph B. Kershaw	Bryan's Brigade BG Goode Bryan	10th Georgia; 50th Georgia; 51st Georgia; 53rd Georgia
Field's Division; MG Charles W. Field	Jenkins' Brigade BG Micah Jenkins (k); Col John Bratton	1st South Carolina (Volunteers); 2nd South Carolina Rifles; 5th South Carolina; 6th South Carolina: Col John Bratton; Palmetto (South Carolina) Sharpshooters
Field's Division; MG Charles W. Field	Law's Brigade Col William F. Perry	4th Alabama; 15th Alabama; 44th Alabama; 47th Alabama; 48th Alabama
Field's Division; MG Charles W. Field	Anderson's Brigade BG George T. Anderson	7th Georgia; 8th Georgia; 9th Georgia; 11th Georgia; 59th Georgia
Field's Division; MG Charles W. Field	Gregg's Brigade BG John Gregg (w)	3rd Arkansas; 1st Texas; 4th Texas; 5th Texas
Field's Division; MG Charles W. Field	Benning's Brigade BG Henry L. Benning (w); Col Dudley M. Du Bose	2nd Georgia; 15th Georgia: Col Dudley M. Du Bose; 17th Georgia; 20th Georgia
Artillery; BG Edward P. Alexander	Huger's Battalion Ltc Frank Huger	Fickling's (South Carolina) Battery; Moody's (Louisiana) Battery; Parker's (Virginia) Battery; J. D. Smith's (Virginia) Battery; Taylor's (Virginia) Battery; Woolfolk's (Virginia) Battery
Artillery; BG Edward P. Alexander	Haskell's Battalion Maj John C. Haskell	Flanner's (North Carolina) Battery; Garden's (South Carolina) Battery; Lamkin's (Virginia) Battery; Ramsay's (North Carolina) Battery
Artillery; BG Edward P. Alexander	Cabell's Battalion Col Henry C. Cabell	Callaway's (Georgia) Battery; Carlton's (Georgia) Battery; McCarthy's (Virginia) Battery; Manly's (North Carolina) Battery

=== Second Corps ===
LTG Richard S. Ewell

General Staff:

- Assistant Adjutant General: Ltc Alexander S. Pendleton
- Assistant Adjutant General: Maj Campbell Brown
- Assistant Inspector General: Col Abner Smead
- Engineer: Maj Benjamin H. Greene
- Aide de Camp: Lt Thomas T. Turner
- Chief of Ordnance: Ltc William Allan
- Medical Director: Dr. Hunter H. McGuire
- Quartermasters: Maj John D. Rogers and Maj A. M. Garber
- Commissaries and subsistence: Maj Wells J. Hawks and Cpt J. J. Lock

Division	Brigade	Regiments and Others
Early's Division; MG Jubal A. Early	Hays' Brigade BG Harry T. Hays	5th Louisiana; 6th Louisiana; 7th Louisiana; 8th Louisiana; 9th Louisiana
Early's Division; MG Jubal A. Early	Pegram's Brigade BG John Pegram (w); Col John S. Hoffman	13th Virginia; 31st Virginia: Col John S. Hoffman; 49th Virginia; 52nd Virginia; 58th Virginia
Early's Division; MG Jubal A. Early	Gordon's Brigade BG John B. Gordon	13th Georgia; 26th Georgia; 31st Georgia; 38th Georgia; 60th Georgia; 61st Georgia
Johnson's Division; MG Edward Johnson	Stonewall Brigade BG James A. Walker	2nd Virginia; 4th Virginia; 5th Virginia; 27th Virginia; 33rd Virginia
Johnson's Division; MG Edward Johnson	Jones' Brigade BG John M. Jones (k); Col William A. Witcher	21st Virginia: Col William A. Witcher; 25th Virginia; 42nd Virginia; 44th Virginia; 48th Virginia; 50th Virginia
Johnson's Division; MG Edward Johnson	Steuart's Brigade BG George H. Steuart	1st North Carolina; 3rd North Carolina; 10th Virginia; 23rd Virginia; 37th Virginia
Johnson's Division; MG Edward Johnson	Stafford's Brigade BG Leroy A. Stafford (mw); Col Zebulon York	1st Louisiana; 2nd Louisiana; 10th Louisiana; 14th Louisiana: Col Zebulon York; 15th Louisiana
Rodes' Division; MG Robert E. Rodes	Daniel's Brigade BG Junius Daniel	32nd North Carolina; 45th North Carolina; 53rd North Carolina; 2nd North Carolina Battalion
Rodes' Division; MG Robert E. Rodes	Doles' Brigade BG George P. Doles	4th Georgia; 12th Georgia; 44th Georgia
Rodes' Division; MG Robert E. Rodes	Ramseur's Brigade BG Stephen D. Ramseur	2nd North Carolina; 4th North Carolina; 14th North Carolina; 30th North Carolina
Rodes' Division; MG Robert E. Rodes	Battle's Brigade BG Cullen A. Battle	3rd Alabama; 5th Alabama; 6th Alabama; 12th Alabama; 61st Alabama
Rodes' Division; MG Robert E. Rodes	Johnston's Brigade BG Robert D. Johnston	5th North Carolina; 12th North Carolina; 20th North Carolina; 23rd North Carolina
Artillery; BG Armistead L. Long	Brown's Division Col J. Thompson Brown (k)	Hardaway's Battalion: Ltc Robert A. Hardaway: Dance's (Virginia) Battery; Graham's (Virginia) Battery; C. B. Griffin's (Virginia) Battery; Jones' (Virginia) Battery; B. H. Smith's (Virginia) Battery; Braxton's Battalion: Ltc Carter M. Braxton: Carpenter's (Virginia) Battery; Cooper's (Virginia) Battery; Hardwicke's (Virginia) Battery; Nelson's Battalion: Ltc William Nelson: Kirkpatrick's (Virginia) Battery; Massie's (Virginia) Battery; Milledge's (Georgia) Battery
Artillery; BG Armistead L. Long	Carter's Division Col Thomas H. Carter	Cutshaw's Battalion: Maj Wilfred E. Cutshaw: Carrington's (Virginia) Battery; A. W. Garber's (Virginia) Battery; Tanner's (Virginia) Battery; Page's Battalion: Maj Richard C. M. Page: W. P. Carter's (Virginia) Battery; Fry's (Virginia) Battery; Page's (Virginia) Battery; Reese's (Alabama) Battery

=== Third Corps ===
LTG Ambrose P. Hill

Division	Brigade	Regiments and Others
Anderson's Division; MG Richard H. Anderson; BG William Mahone	Perrin's Brigade BG Abner M. Perrin	8th Alabama; 9th Alabama; 10th Alabama; 11th Alabama; 14th Alabama
Anderson's Division; MG Richard H. Anderson; BG William Mahone	Harris' Brigade BG Nathaniel H. Harris	12th Mississippi; 16th Mississippi; 19th Mississippi; 48th Mississippi
Anderson's Division; MG Richard H. Anderson; BG William Mahone	Mahone's Brigade BG William Mahone; Col David A. Weisiger	6th Virginia; 12th Virginia: Col David A. Weisiger; 16th Virginia; 41st Virginia; 61st Virginia
Anderson's Division; MG Richard H. Anderson; BG William Mahone	Wright's Brigade BG Ambrose R. Wright	3rd Georgia; 22nd Georgia; 48th Georgia; 2nd Georgia Battalion; 10th Georgia Battalion
Anderson's Division; MG Richard H. Anderson; BG William Mahone	Perry's Brigade BG Edward A. Perry (w); Col David Lang	2nd Florida; 5th Florida; 8th Florida: Col David Lang
Heth's Division; MG Henry Heth	Davis' Brigade Col John M. Stone	1st Confederate Battalion; 2nd Mississippi; 11th Mississippi; 26th Mississippi; 42nd Mississippi; 55th North Carolina
Heth's Division; MG Henry Heth	Cooke's Brigade BG John R. Cooke	15th North Carolina; 27th North Carolina; 46th North Carolina; 48th North Carolina
Heth's Division; MG Henry Heth	Kirkland's Brigade BG William W. Kirkland	11th North Carolina; 26th North Carolina; 44th North Carolina; 47th North Carolina; 52nd North Carolina
Heth's Division; MG Henry Heth	Archer's and Walker's Brigade BG Henry H. Walker	Archer's Brigade: 13th Alabama; 1st Tennessee (Provisional Army); 7th Tennessee; 14th Tennessee; Walker's Brigade: 40th Virginia; 47th Virginia; 55th Virginia; 22nd Virginia Battalion
Wilcox's Division; MG Cadmus M. Wilcox	Lane' s Brigade BG James H. Lane	7th North Carolina; 18th North Carolina; 28th North Carolina; 33rd North Carolina; 37th North Carolina
Wilcox's Division; MG Cadmus M. Wilcox	Scales' Brigade BG Alfred M. Scales	13th North Carolina; 16th North Carolina; 22nd North Carolina; 34th North Carolina; 38th North Carolina
Wilcox's Division; MG Cadmus M. Wilcox	McGowan's Brigade BG Samuel McGowan	1st South Carolina (Provisional Army); 1st South Carolina Rifles; 12th South Carolina; 13th South Carolina; 14th South Carolina
Wilcox's Division; MG Cadmus M. Wilcox	Thomas' Brigade BG Edward L. Thomas	14th Georgia; 35th Georgia; 45th Georgia; 49th Georgia
Artillery; Col Reuben L. Walker	Poague's Battalion Ltc William T. Poague	Richards' (Mississippi) Battery; Utterback's (Virginia) Battery; Williams' (North Carolina) Battery; Wyatt's (Virginia) Battery
Artillery; Col Reuben L. Walker	Pegram's Battalion Ltc William J. Pegram	Brander's (Virginia) Battery; Cayce's (Virginia) Battery; Ellett's (Virginia) Battery; Marye's (Virginia) Battery; Zimmerman's (South Carolina) Battery
Artillery; Col Reuben L. Walker	McIntosh' s Battalion Ltc David G. McIntosh	Clutter's (Virginia) Battery; Donald's (Virginia) Battery; Hurt's (Alabama) Battery; Price's (Virginia) Battery
Artillery; Col Reuben L. Walker	Cutts' Battalion Col Allen S. Cutts	Patterson's (Georgia) Battery; Ross' (Georgia) Battery; Wingfield's (Georgia) Battery
Artillery; Col Reuben L. Walker	Richardson's Battalion Ltc Charles Richardson	Grandy's (Virginia) Battery; Landry's (Louisiana) Battery; Moore's (Virginia) Battery; Penick's (Virginia) Battery

=== Cavalry Corps ===
MG J.E.B. Stuart

Division	Brigade	Regiments and Others
Hampton's Division; MG Wade Hampton	Young's Brigade Col Gilbert J. Wright	Cobb's (Georgia) Legion; Phillips' (Georgia) Legion; Jeff. Davis (Mississippi) Legion
Hampton's Division; MG Wade Hampton	Rosser's Brigade BG Thomas L. Rosser	7th Virginia; 11th Virginia; 12th Virginia; 35th Virginia Battalion
Fitzhugh Lee's Division; MG Fitzhugh Lee	Lomax's Brigade BG Lunsford L. Lomax	5th Virginia; 6th Virginia; 15th Virginia
Fitzhugh Lee's Division; MG Fitzhugh Lee	Wickham's Brigade Col Thomas T. Munford	1st Virginia; 2nd Virginia; 3rd Virginia; 4th Virginia
William H. F. Lee's Division; MG William H. F. Lee	Chambliss' Brigade BG John R. Chambliss	9th Virginia; 10th Virginia; 13th Virginia
William H. F. Lee's Division; MG William H. F. Lee	Gordon's Brigade BG James B. Gordon	1st North Carolina; 2nd North Carolina; 5th North Carolina
Horse Artillery; Maj R. Preston Chew	Breathed's Battalion Maj James Breathed	Hart's (South Carolina) Battery; Johnston's (Virginia) Battery; McGregor's (Virginia) Battery; Shoemaker's (Virginia) Battery; Thomson's (Virginia) Battery

== Strengths ==
The following table shows total strengths of each of the major formations at the start of the battle.

=== First Corps ===
McLaws' Division	Strength
Kershaw's Brigade	1.590
Wofford's Brigade	1.615
Humphreys' Brigade	940
Bryan's Brigade	1.025
Field's Division	Strength
Jenkins' Brigade	1.590
Law's Brigade	1.255
Anderson's Brigade	1.390
Gregg's Brigade	850
Benning's Brigade	995
First Corps Total	Strength
McLaws' Division	5.170
Field's Division	6.080
Artillery	1.595
Total	12.845

=== Second Corps ===
Early's Division	Strength
Hays' Brigade	900
Pegram's Brigade	1.520
Gordon's Brigade	2.270
Johnson's Division	Strength
Stonewall Brigade	1.320
Jones' Brigade	1.850
Steuart's Brigade	1.610
Stafford's Brigade	705
Rodes' Division	Strength
Daniel's Brigade	1.500
Doles' Brigade	1.365
Ramseur's Brigade	1.440
Battle's Brigade	1.810
Johnston's Brigade	1.320
Second Corps Total	Strength
Early's Division	4.960
Johnson's Division	5.485
Rodes' Division	7.435
Artillery	1.700
Total	19.580

=== Third Corps ===
Anderson's Division	Strength
Perrin's Brigade	1.635
Harris' Brigade	1.395
Mahone's Brigade	1.805
Wright's Brigade	1.685
Perry's Brigade	610
Heth's Division	Strength
Davis' Brigade	1.690
Cooke's Brigade	1.960
Kirkland's Brigade	2.150
Archer's Brigade	755
Walker's Brigade	895
Wilcox's Division	Strength
Lane' s Brigade	2.350
Scales' Brigade	1.735
McGowan's Brigade	2.230
Thomas' Brigade	1.600
Third Corps Total	Strength
Anderson's Division	7.130
Heth's Division	7.450
Wilcox's Division	7.915
Artillery	1.910
Total	24.405

=== Cavalry Corps ===
Cavalry Corps	Strength
Hampton's Division	2.475
Fitzhugh Lee's Division	3.450
William H. F. Lee's Division	2.905
Horse Artillery	470
Total	9.300

=== Total Army of Northern Virginia ===
Total Army of Northern Virginia	Strength
First Corps	12.845
Second Corps	19.580
Third Corps	24.405
Cavalry Corps	9.300
Total	66.130

== See also ==
- Spotsylvania Court House Confederate order of battle
- Cold Harbor Confederate order of battle
