= Battle of Cold Harbor order of battle: Confederate =

The following Confederate States Army units and commanders fought in the Battle of Cold Harbor (May 31–June 12, 1864) of the American Civil War. The Union order of battle is listed separately. Order of battle compiled from the army organization during the battle and the reports.

== Abbreviations used ==
=== Military rank ===
- Gen = General
- LTG = Lieutenant General
- MG = Major General
- BG = Brigadier General
- Col = Colonel
- Ltc = Lieutenant Colonel
- Maj = Major
- Cpt = Captain
- Lt = Lieutenant

=== Other ===
- (w) = wounded
- (mw) = mortally wounded
- (k) = killed
- (c) = captured

== Army of Northern Virginia ==
Gen Robert E. Lee, Commanding

General Staff:

- Chief Engineer: MG Martin L. Smith
- Chief of Artillery: BG William N. Pendleton
- Assistant Adjutant General: Ltc Walter H. Taylor
- Aide de Camp: Ltc Charles Marshall
- Aide de Camp: Maj Charles S. Venable

=== First Corps ===
MG Richard H. Anderson

Division	Brigade	Regiments and Others
McLaws' (old) Division; BG Joseph B. Kershaw	Kershaw's Brigade Col Lawrence M. Keitt (mw); Col John W. Henagan	2nd South Carolina; 3rd South Carolina; 7th South Carolina; 8th South Carolina: Col John W. Henagan; 15th South Carolina; 20th South Carolina; 3rd South Carolina Battalion
McLaws' (old) Division; BG Joseph B. Kershaw	Humphreys' Brigade BG Benjamin G. Humphreys	13th Mississippi; 17th Mississippi; 18th Mississippi; 21st Mississippi
McLaws' (old) Division; BG Joseph B. Kershaw	Wofford's Brigade BG William T. Wofford	16th Georgia; 18th Georgia; 24th Georgia; Cobb's (Georgia) Legion; Phillips' (Georgia) Legion; 3rd Georgia Battalion Sharpshooters
McLaws' (old) Division; BG Joseph B. Kershaw	Bryan's Brigade BG Goode Bryan; Col James P. Simms	10th Georgia; 50th Georgia; 51st Georgia; 53rd Georgia: Col James P. Simms
Field's Division; MG Charles W. Field	Jenkins' Brigade Col John Bratton	1st South Carolina (Volunteers); 2nd South Carolina Rifles; 5th South Carolina; 6th South Carolina; Palmetto (South Carolina) Sharpshooters
Field's Division; MG Charles W. Field	Gregg's Brigade BG John Gregg	3rd Arkansas; 1st Texas; 4th Texas; 5th Texas
Field's Division; MG Charles W. Field	Law's Brigade BG Evander M. Law (w); Col William F. Perry	4th Alabama; 15th Alabama; 44th Alabama: Col William F. Perry; 47th Alabama; 48th Alabama
Field's Division; MG Charles W. Field	Anderson's Brigade BG George T. Anderson	7th Georgia; 8th Georgia; 9th Georgia; 11th Georgia; 59th Georgia
Field's Division; MG Charles W. Field	Benning's Brigade Col Dudley M. DuBose	2nd Georgia; 15th Georgia; 17th Georgia; 20th Georgia
Pickett's Division; MG George E. Pickett	Kemper's Brigade Col William R. Terry	1st Virginia; 3rd Virginia; 7th Virginia; 11th Virginia; 24th Virginia
Pickett's Division; MG George E. Pickett	Hunton's Brigade BG Eppa Hunton	8th Virginia; 18th Virginia; 19th Virginia; 28th Virginia; 56th Virginia
Pickett's Division; MG George E. Pickett	Barton's Brigade BG Seth M. Barton	9th Virginia; 14th Virginia; 38th Virginia; 53rd Virginia; 57th Virginia
Pickett's Division; MG George E. Pickett	Corse's Brigade BG Montgomery D. Corse	15th Virginia; 17th Virginia; 29th Virginia; 30th Virginia; 32nd Virginia
Artillery; BG Edward P. Alexander	Huger's Battalion Ltc Frank Huger	Fickling's (South Carolina) Battery; Moody's (Louisiana) Battery; Parker's (Virginia) Battery; Smith's (Virginia) Battery; Taylor's (Virginia) Battery; Woolfolk's (Virginia) Battery
Artillery; BG Edward P. Alexander	Haskell's Battalion Maj John C. Haskell	Flanner's (North Carolina) Battery; Garden's (South Carolina) Battery; Lamkin's (Virginia) Battery; Ramsay's (North Carolina) Battery
Artillery; BG Edward P. Alexander	Cabell's Battalion Col Henry C. Cabell	Callaway's (Georgia) Battery; Carlton's (Georgia) Battery; McCarthy's (Virginia) Battery; Manly's (North Carolina) Battery

=== Second Corps ===
MG Jubal A. Early

Division	Brigade	Regiments and Others
Early's Division; BG Stephan D. Ramseur	Pegram's Brigade Ltc Robert D. Lilley	13th Virginia; 31st Virginia; 49th Virginia; 52nd Virginia; 58th Virginia
Early's Division; BG Stephan D. Ramseur	Johnston's Brigade Col Thomas F. Toon	5th North Carolina; 12th North Carolina; 20th North Carolina; 23rd North Carolina
Early's Division; BG Stephan D. Ramseur	Hoke's (old) Brigade Ltc William G. Lewis	6th North Carolina; 21st North Carolina; 54th North Carolina; 57th North Carolina; 1st North Carolina Battalion Sharpshooters
Gordon's Division; MG John B. Gordon	Evans' Brigade BG Clement A. Evans	13th Georgia; 26th Georgia; 31st Georgia; 38th Georgia; 60th Georgia; 61st Georgia; 12th Georgia Battalion
Gordon's Division; MG John B. Gordon	Hays' and Stafford's Brigade Col Zebulon York	Hays’ Brigade: 5th Louisiana; 6th Louisiana; 7th Louisiana; 8th Louisiana; 9th Louisiana; Stafford's Brigade: 1st Louisiana; 2nd Louisiana; 10th Louisiana; 14th Louisiana; 15th Louisiana
Gordon's Division; MG John B. Gordon	Terry's Brigade BG William Terry	Stonewall Brigade consolidated: 2nd Virginia; 4th Virginia; 5th Virginia; 27th Virginia; 33rd Virginia; Jones' Brigade consolidated: 21st Virginia; 25th Virginia; 42nd Virginia; 44th Virginia; 48th Virginia; 50th Virginia; Steuart's Brigade consolidated: 10th Virginia; 23rd Virginia; 37th Virginia
Rodes's Division; MG Robert E. Rodes	Daniel's Brigade BG Bryan Grimes	32nd North Carolina; 43rd North Carolina; 45th North Carolina; 53rd North Carolina; 2nd North Carolina Battalion
Rodes's Division; MG Robert E. Rodes	Ramseur's Brigade Col R. Tyler Bennett (w); Col William Ruffin Cox	1st North Carolina; 2nd North Carolina: Col William Ruffin Cox; 3rd North Carolina; 4th North Carolina; 14th North Carolina; 30th North Carolina
Rodes's Division; MG Robert E. Rodes	Battle's Brigade BG Cullen A. Battle	3rd Alabama; 5th Alabama; 6th Alabama; 12th Alabama; 61st Alabama
Rodes's Division; MG Robert E. Rodes	Doles' Brigade BG George Doles (k); Col Philip Cook	4th Georgia: Col Philip Cook; 12th Georgia; 21st Georgia; 44th Georgia
Artillery; BG Armistead L. Long; Col Thomas H. Carter	Hardaway's Battalion Ltc Robert A. Hardaway	Dance's (Virginia) Battery; Graham's (Virginia) Battery; C. B. Griffin's (Virginia) Battery; Jones's (Virginia) Battery; B. H. Smith's (Virginia) Battery
Artillery; BG Armistead L. Long; Col Thomas H. Carter	Braxton's Battalion Ltc Carter M. Braxton	Carpenter's (Virginia) Battery; Cooper's (Virginia) Battery; Hardwicke's (Virginia) Battery
Artillery; BG Armistead L. Long; Col Thomas H. Carter	Nelson's Battalion Ltc William Nelson	Kirkpatrick's (Virginia) Battery; Massie's (Virginia) Battery; Milledge's (Georgia) Battery
Artillery; BG Armistead L. Long; Col Thomas H. Carter	Cutshaw's Battalion Maj Richard C. M. Page; Maj Wilfred E. Cutshaw	Fry's (Virginia) Battery; A. W. Garber's (Virginia) Battery; Tanner's (Virginia) Battery

=== Third Corps ===
LTG Ambrose P. Hill

Division	Brigade	Regiments and Others
Anderson's Division; BG William Mahone	Perrin's Brigade Col John C. C. Sanders	8th Alabama; 9th Alabama; 10th Alabama; 11th Alabama; 14th Alabama
Anderson's Division; BG William Mahone	Mahone's Brigade Col David A. Weisiger	6th Virginia; 12th Virginia; 16th Virginia; 41st Virginia; 61st Virginia
Anderson's Division; BG William Mahone	Harris' Brigade BG Nathaniel H. Harris	12th Mississippi; 16th Mississippi; 19th Mississippi; 48th Mississippi
Anderson's Division; BG William Mahone	Perry's and Finegan's Brigade BG Joseph Finegan	Perry's Brigade: 2nd Florida; 5th Florida; 8th Florida; Finegan's Brigade: 1st Florida Battalion; 2nd Florida Battalion; 4th Florida Battalion; 6th Florida Battalion
Anderson's Division; BG William Mahone	Wright's Brigade BG Ambrose R. Wright	3rd Georgia; 22nd Georgia; 48th Georgia; 2nd Georgia Battalion; 10th Georgia Battalion
Heth's Division; MG Henry Heth	Davis' Brigade BG Joseph R. Davis	1st Confederate Battalion; 2nd Mississippi; 11th Mississippi; 26th Mississippi; 42nd Mississippi; 55th North Carolina
Heth's Division; MG Henry Heth	Cooke's Brigade BG John R. Cooke	15th North Carolina; 27th North Carolina; 46th North Carolina; 48th North Carolina
Heth's Division; MG Henry Heth	Archer's and Walker's Brigade BG Birkett D. Fry	Archer's Brigade: 13th Alabama; 1st Tennessee (Provisional Army); 7th Tennessee; 14th Tennessee; Walker's Brigade: 40th Virginia; 47th Virginia; 55th Virginia; 22nd Virginia Battalion
Heth's Division; MG Henry Heth	Kirkland's Brigade BG William W. Kirkland (w); Col George H. Faribault	11th North Carolina; 26th North Carolina; 44th North Carolina; 47th North Carolina: Col George H. Faribault; 52nd North Carolina
Wilcox's Division; MG Cadmus M. Wilcox	Lane's Brigade BG James H. Lane (w); Col John D. Barry	7th North Carolina; 18th North Carolina: Col John D. Barry; 28th North Carolina; 33rd North Carolina; 37th North Carolina
Wilcox's Division; MG Cadmus M. Wilcox	McGowan's Brigade Ltc Isaac F. Hunt; BG James Conner	1st South Carolina (Provisional Army); 1st South Carolina Rifles; 12th South Carolina; 13th South Carolina: Ltc Isaac F. Hunt; 14th South Carolina
Wilcox's Division; MG Cadmus M. Wilcox	Scales' Brigade BG Alfred M. Scales; Col William L. J. Lowrance	13th North Carolina; 16th North Carolina; 22nd North Carolina; 34th North Carolina: Col William L. J. Lowrance; 38th North Carolina
Wilcox's Division; MG Cadmus M. Wilcox	Thomas's Brigade BG Edward L. Thomas	14th Georgia; 35th Georgia; 45th Georgia; 49th Georgia
Artillery; Col R. Lindsay Walker	Poague's Battalion Ltc William T. Poague (w); Cpt Addison W. Utterback	Richard's (Mississippi) Battery; Utterback's (Virginia) Battery: Cpt Addison W. Utterback; Williams' (North Carolina) Battery; Wyatt's (Virginia) Battery
Artillery; Col R. Lindsay Walker	Pegram's Battalion Ltc William J. Pegram	Brander's (Virginia) Battery; Cayce's (Virginia) Battery; Ellett's (Virginia) Battery; Marye's (Virginia) Battery; Zimmerman's (South Carolina) Battery
Artillery; Col R. Lindsay Walker	McIntosh's Battalion Ltc David G. McIntosh	Clutter's (Virginia) Battery; Donald's (Virginia) Battery; Hurt's (Alabama) Battery; Price's (Virginia) Battery
Artillery; Col R. Lindsay Walker	Richardson's Battalion Maj Merritt B. Miller	Grandy's (Virginia) Battery; Landry's (Louisiana) Battery; Moore's (Virginia) Battery; Penick's (Virginia) Battery
Artillery; Col R. Lindsay Walker	Cutts' Battalion Col Allen S. Cutts	Patterson's (Georgia) Battery; Ross' (Georgia) Battery; Wingfield's (Georgia) Battery
Artillery; Col R. Lindsay Walker	Washington (Louisiana) Battalion Ltc Benjamin F. Eshleman	First Company; Second Company; Third Company; Fourth Company

=== Cavalry Corps ===
MG Wade Hampton

Division	Brigade	Regiments and Others
Hampton's Division; MG Wade Hampton	Young's Brigade Col Gilbert J. Wright	7th Georgia; Cobb's (Georgia) Legion; Phillips' (Georgia) Legion; 20th Georgia Battalion; Jeff Davis (Mississippi) Legion
Hampton's Division; MG Wade Hampton	Rosser's Brigade BG Thomas L. Rosser (w); Ltc Richard H. Dulany	7th Virginia: Ltc Richard H. Dulany; 11th Virginia; 12th Virginia; 35th Virginia Battalion
Hampton's Division; MG Wade Hampton	Butler's Brigade BG Matthew C. Butler	4th South Carolina; 5th South Carolina; 6th South Carolina
Fitzhugh Lee's Division; MG Fitzhugh Lee	Lomax's Brigade BG Lunsford L. Lomax	1st Maryland; 5th Virginia; 6th Virginia; 15th Virginia
Fitzhugh Lee's Division; MG Fitzhugh Lee	Wickham's Brigade BG Williams C. Wickham	1st Virginia; 2nd Virginia; 3rd Virginia; 4th Virginia
William H. F. Lee's Division; MG William H.F. Lee	Chambliss's Brigade BG John R. Chambliss, Jr.	9th Virginia; 10th Virginia; 13th Virginia
William H. F. Lee's Division; MG William H.F. Lee	Gordon's Brigade BG Pierce M. B. Young (w); Col John A. Baker; Ltc Rufus Barringer	1st North Carolina: Ltc Rufus Barringer; 2nd North Carolina; 3rd North Carolina: Col John A. Baker; 5th North Carolina
Reporting directly	Gary's Command BG Martin W. Gary	7th South Carolina; Hampton's (South Carolina) Legion (Mounted)
Horse Artillery; Maj R. Preston Chew	Breathed's Battalion Maj James Breathed	Griffin's (Maryland) Battery; Hart's (South Carolina) Battery; Johnston's (Virginia) Battery; McGregor's (Virginia) Battery; Shoemaker's (Virginia) Battery; Thomson's (Virginia) Battery

=== Breckinridge's Division ===
Division	Brigade	Regiments and Others
Breckinridge's Division; MG John C. Breckinridge	Echols' Brigade BG John Echols	22nd Virginia; 23rd Virginia Battalion; 26th Virginia Battalion
Breckinridge's Division; MG John C. Breckinridge	Wharton's Brigade BG Gabriel C. Wharton	51st Virginia; 62nd Virginia Mounted (dismounted); 30th Virginia Battalion Sharpshooters
Breckinridge's Division; MG John C. Breckinridge	McLaughlin's Artillery Battalion Maj William McLaughlin	Chapman's (Virginia) Battery; Jackson's (Virginia) Battery; McClanahan's (Virginia) Battery
Breckinridge's Division; MG John C. Breckinridge	King's Artillery Battalion Ltc J. Floyd King; Maj Wade H. Gibbes	Davidson's (Virginia) Battery; Dickenson's (Virginia) Battery; Walker's (Virginia) Battery
Breckinridge's Division; MG John C. Breckinridge	Maryland Line Col Bradley T. Johnson	2nd Maryland; Chew's (Maryland) Battery; Dement's (Maryland) Battery

=== Hoke's Division ===
Division	Brigade	Regiments and Others
Hoke's Division; MG Robert F. Hoke	Martin's Brigade BG James G. Martin	17th North Carolina; 42nd North Carolina; 66th North Carolina
Hoke's Division; MG Robert F. Hoke	Clingman's Brigade BG Thomas L. Clingman	8th North Carolina; 31st North Carolina; 51st North Carolina; 61st North Carolina
Hoke's Division; MG Robert F. Hoke	Hagood's Brigade BG Johnson Hagood	11th South Carolina; 21st South Carolina; 25th South Carolina; 27th South Carolina; 7th South Carolina Battalion
Hoke's Division; MG Robert F. Hoke	Colquitt's Brigade BG Alfred H. Colquitt	6th Georgia; 19th Georgia; 23rd Georgia; 27th Georgia; 28th Georgia
Hoke's Division; MG Robert F. Hoke	Read's Artillery Battalion Maj John P. W. Read	Blount's (Virginia) Battery; Caskie's (Virginia) Battery; Macon's (Virginia) Battery; Marshall's (Virginia) Battery

== See also ==
- Wilderness Confederate order of battle
- Spotsylvania Court House Confederate order of battle
