= Battle of Chancellorsville order of battle: Confederate =

The following Confederate States Army units and commanders fought in Virginia's Battle of Chancellorsville, which lasted from April 30 to May 6, 1863, during the American Civil War. The Union order of battle is listed separately. Order of battle has been compiled from the army organization during the campaign, the casualty returns and the reports.

== Abbreviations used ==
=== Military rank ===
- Gen = General
- LTG = Lieutenant General
- MG = Major General
- BG = Brigadier General
- Col = Colonel
- Ltc = Lieutenant Colonel
- Maj = Major
- Cpt = Captain
- Lt = Lieutenant

=== Other ===
- (w) = wounded
- (mw) = mortally wounded
- (k) = killed in action
- (c) = captured

== Army of Northern Virginia ==
Gen Robert E. Lee

=== First Corps ===
Gen Robert E. Lee

Chief of Artillery: Col James B. Walton

Division	Brigade	Regiments and Others
McLaws' Division; MG Lafayette McLaws	Wofford's Brigade BG William T. Wofford	16th Georgia: Col Goode Bryan; 18th Georgia: Col Solon Z. Ruff; 24th Georgia: Col Robert McMillan; Cobb's (Georgia) Legion: Ltc Luther J. Glenn; Phillips' (Georgia) Legion: Ltc Elihu S. Barclay, Jr.
McLaws' Division; MG Lafayette McLaws	Semmes' Brigade BG Paul J. Semmes	10th Georgia: Ltc Willis C. Holt; 50th Georgia: Ltc Francis Kearse; 51st Georgia: Col William M. Slaughter (mw), Ltc Edward Ball (w), Maj Oliver P. Anthony; 53rd Georgia: Col James P. Simms
McLaws' Division; MG Lafayette McLaws	Kershaw's Brigade BG Joseph B. Kershaw	2nd South Carolina: Col John D. Kennedy; 3rd South Carolina: Maj Robert C. Maffett; 7th South Carolina: Col Elbert Bland; 8th South Carolina: Col John W. Henagan; 15th South Carolina: Ltc Joseph F. Gist; 3rd South Carolina Battalion: Ltc William G. Rice
McLaws' Division; MG Lafayette McLaws	Barksdale's Brigade BG William Barksdale	13th Mississippi: Col James W. Carter; 17th Mississippi: Col William D. Holder; 18th Mississippi: Col Thomas M. Griffin (c); 21st Mississippi: Col Benjamin G. Humphreys
McLaws' Division; MG Lafayette McLaws	Cabell's Artillery Battalion Col Henry C. Cabell; Maj Samuel P. Hamilton	Carlton's (Georgia) battery: Cpt Henry H. Carlton; Fraser's (Georgia) battery: Cpt John C. Fraser; McCarthy's (Virginia) battery: Cpt Edward S. McCarthy; Manly's (North Carolina) battery: Cpt Basil C. Manly
Anderson's Division; MG Richard H. Anderson	Wilcox's Brigade BG Cadmus M. Wilcox	8th Alabama: Col Young L. Royston (w), Ltc Hilary A. Herbert; 9th Alabama: Maj Jeremiah H. J. Williams; 10th Alabama: Col William H. Forney (w); 11th Alabama: Col John C. C. Sanders; 14th Alabama: Col Lucius Pinckard (w)
Anderson's Division; MG Richard H. Anderson	Wright's Brigade BG Ambrose R. Wright	3rd Georgia: Maj John F. Jones (w), Cpt Charles H. Andrews; 22nd Georgia: Ltc Joseph Wasden; 48th Georgia: Ltc Reuben W. Carswell; 2nd Georgia Battalion: Maj George W. Ross
Anderson's Division; MG Richard H. Anderson	Mahone's Brigade BG William Mahone	6th Virginia: Col George T. Rogers; 12th Virginia: Ltc Everard M. Feild; 16th Virginia: Ltc Richard O. Whitehead; 41st Virginia: Col William A. Parham; 61st Virginia: Col Virginius D. Groner
Anderson's Division; MG Richard H. Anderson	Posey's Brigade BG Carnot Posey	12th Mississippi: Ltc Merry B. Harris (w), Maj Samuel B. Thomas; 16th Mississippi: Col Samuel E. Baker; 19th Mississippi: Col Nathaniel H. Harris; 48th Mississippi: Col Joseph M. Jayne (w)
Anderson's Division; MG Richard H. Anderson	Perry's Brigade BG Edward A. Perry	2nd Florida: Maj Walter R. Moore (w); 5th Florida: Maj Benjamin F. Davis (w); 8th Florida: Col David Lang
Anderson's Division; MG Richard H. Anderson	Garnett's Artillery Battalion Ltc John J. Garnett; Maj Robert A. Hardaway	Grandy's (Virginia) battery: Cpt Charles R. Grandy; Lewis' (Virginia) battery: Lt Nathan Penick; Maurin's (Louisiana) battery: Cpt Victor Maurin; Moore's (Virginia) battery: Cpt Joseph D. Moore
Artillery Reserve	Alexander's Battalion Col E. Porter Alexander; Maj Frank Huger	Eubank's (Virginia) battery: Lt Osmond B. Taylor; Jordan's (Virginia) battery: Cpt Tyler C. Jordan; Moody's (Louisiana) battery: Cpt George V. Moody; Parker's (Virginia) battery: Cpt William W. Parker; Rhett's (South Carolina) battery: Cpt A. Burnett Rhett; Woolfolk's (Virginia) battery: Cpt Pichegru Woolfolk, Jr.
Artillery Reserve	Washington (Louisiana) Artillery Battalion Col James B. Walton	1st Company: Cpt Charles W. Squires (c), Lt Charles H. C. Brown; 2nd Company: Cpt John B. Richardson; 3rd Company: Cpt Merritt B. Miller; 4th Company: Cpt Benjamin F. Eshleman

=== Second Corps ===
LTG Thomas J. Jackson (mw)
MG Ambrose P. Hill (w)
BG Robert E. Rodes
MG J. E. B. Stuart

Chief of Artillery: Col Stapleton Crutchfield (w), Col E. Porter Alexander, Col J. Thompson Brown

Division	Brigade	Regiments and Others
A. P. Hill's Light Division; MG Ambrose P. Hill; BG Henry Heth (w); BG William D. Pender (w); BG James J. Archer	Heth's Brigade BG Henry Heth; Col John M. Brockenbrough	40th Virginia: Col John M. Brockenbrough, Ltc Fleet W. Cox (w), Cpt T. Edwin Betts; 47th Virginia: Col Robert M. Mayo; 55th Virginia: Col Francis Mallory (k), Ltc William S. Christian (w), Maj Andrew D. Saunders (k), Lt R. L. Williams, Maj Evan Rice; 22nd Virginia Battalion: Ltc Edward P. Tayloe
A. P. Hill's Light Division; MG Ambrose P. Hill; BG Henry Heth (w); BG William D. Pender (w); BG James J. Archer	Thomas' Brigade BG Edward L. Thomas	14th Georgia: Col Robert W. Folsom; 35th Georgia: Cpt John Duke; 45th Georgia: Ltc Washington L. Grice; 49th Georgia: Maj Samuel T. Player
A. P. Hill's Light Division; MG Ambrose P. Hill; BG Henry Heth (w); BG William D. Pender (w); BG James J. Archer	Lane's Brigade BG James H. Lane	7th North Carolina: Col Edward G. Haywood (w), Ltc Junius L. Hill (k), Maj William L. Davidson (w), Cpt Nathan A. Pool; 18th North Carolina: Col Thomas J. Purdie (k), Ltc Forney George (w), Maj John D. Barry; 28th North Carolina: Col Samuel D. Lowe; 33rd North Carolina: Col Clark M. Avery (w), Cpt Joseph H. Saunders; 37th North Carolina: Col William M. Barbour (w)
A. P. Hill's Light Division; MG Ambrose P. Hill; BG Henry Heth (w); BG William D. Pender (w); BG James J. Archer	McGowan's Brigade BG Samuel McGowan (w); Col Oliver E. Edwards (mw); Col Abner M. Perrin; Col Daniel H. Hamilton	1st South Carolina (Provisional Army): Col Daniel H. Hamilton, Cpt Washington P. Shooter; 1st South Carolina Rifles: Col James M. Perrin (mw), Ltc Francis E. Harrison; 12th South Carolina: Col John L. Miller; 13th South Carolina: Col Oliver E. Edwards, Ltc Benjamin T. Brockman; 14th South Carolina: Col Abner Perrin
A. P. Hill's Light Division; MG Ambrose P. Hill; BG Henry Heth (w); BG William D. Pender (w); BG James J. Archer	Archer's Brigade BG James J. Archer; Col Birkett D. Fry	13th Alabama: Col Birkett D. Fry; 5th Alabama Battalion: Cpt S. D. Stewart (k), Cpt A. N. Porter; 1st Tennessee (Provisional Army): Ltc Newton J. George; 7th Tennessee: Ltc John A. Fite (w); 14th Tennessee: Col William McComb (w), Cpt R. C. Wilson
A. P. Hill's Light Division; MG Ambrose P. Hill; BG Henry Heth (w); BG William D. Pender (w); BG James J. Archer	Pender's Brigade BG William D. Pender	13th North Carolina: Col Alfred M. Scales (w), Ltc Joseph H. Hyman; 16th North Carolina: Col John S. McElroy (w), Ltc William A. Stowe (w); 22nd North Carolina: Ltc Chris C. Cole (k), Maj Laben Odell (k), Cpt George A. Graves; 34th North Carolina: Col William L. J. Lowrance; 38th North Carolina: Ltc John Ashford
A. P. Hill's Light Division; MG Ambrose P. Hill; BG Henry Heth (w); BG William D. Pender (w); BG James J. Archer	Walker's Artillery Battalion Col R. Lindsay Walker; Maj William R. J. Pegram	Brunson's (South Carolina) battery: Cpt Ervin B. Brunson; Crenshaw's (Virginia) battery: Lt John H. Chamberlayne; Davidson's (Virginia) battery: Cpt Greenlee Davidson (mw), Lt Thomas A. Brander; McGraw's (Virginia) battery: Lt Joseph McGraw; Marye's (Virginia) battery: Cpt Edward A. Marye
D. H. Hill's Division; BG Robert E. Rodes; BG Stephen D. Ramseur	Rodes' Brigade Col Edward A. O'Neal (w); Col Josephus M. Hall	3rd Alabama: Cpt Malachi F. Bonham; 5th Alabama: Col Josephus M. Hall, Ltc E. Lafayette Hobson (w), Cpt William T. Renfro (mw), Cpt Thomas M. Riley; 6th Alabama: Col James N. Lightfoot; 12th Alabama: Col Samuel B. Pickens; 26th Alabama: Ltc John S. Garvin (w), Lt Miles J. Taylor
D. H. Hill's Division; BG Robert E. Rodes; BG Stephen D. Ramseur	Colquitt's Brigade BG Alfred H. Colquitt	6th Georgia: Col John T. Lofton; 19th Georgia: Col Andrew J. Hutchins; 23rd Georgia: Col Emory F. Best; 27th Georgia: Col Charles T. Zachry; 28th Georgia: Col Tully Graybill
D. H. Hill's Division; BG Robert E. Rodes; BG Stephen D. Ramseur	Ramseur's Brigade BG Stephen D. Ramseur (w); Col Francis M. Parker	2nd North Carolina: Col William Ruffin Cox (w); 4th North Carolina: Col Bryan Grimes; 14th North Carolina: Col R. Tyler Bennett; 30th North Carolina: Col Francis M. Parker
D. H. Hill's Division; BG Robert E. Rodes; BG Stephen D. Ramseur	Doles' Brigade BG George P. Doles	4th Georgia: Col Philip Cook (w), Ltc David R. E. Winn; 12th Georgia: Col Edward Willis; 21st Georgia: Col John T. Mercer; 44th Georgia: Col John B. Estes
D. H. Hill's Division; BG Robert E. Rodes; BG Stephen D. Ramseur	Iverson's Brigade BG Alfred Iverson, Jr. (w)	5th North Carolina: Col Thomas M. Garrett (w), Ltc John W. Lea (w), Maj William J. Hill (w), Cpt Speight B. West; 12th North Carolina: Maj David P. Rowe (mw), Ltc Robert D. Johnston; 20th North Carolina: Col Thomas F. Toon (w), Ltc Nelson Slough; 23rd North Carolina: Col Daniel H. Christie
D. H. Hill's Division; BG Robert E. Rodes; BG Stephen D. Ramseur	Carter's Artillery Battalion Ltc Thomas H. Carter	Reese's (Alabama) battery: Cpt William J. Reese; Carter's (Virginia) battery: Cpt William P. Carter; Fry's (Virginia) battery: Cpt Charles W. Fry; Page's (Virginia) battery: Cpt Richard C. M. Page
Early's Division; MG Jubal A. Early	Gordon's Brigade BG John B. Gordon	13th Georgia: Col James M. Smith; 26th Georgia: Col Edmund N. Atkinson; 31st Georgia: Col Clement A. Evans (w); 38th Georgia: Col James D. Mathews; 60th Georgia: Col William H. Stiles; 61st Georgia: Col John H. Lamar
Early's Division; MG Jubal A. Early	Hoke's Brigade BG Robert Hoke (w); Col Isaac E. Avery	6th North Carolina: Col Isaac E. Avery, Maj Samuel M. Tate; 21st North Carolina: Ltc William S. Rankin; 54th North Carolina: Col James C. S. McDowell (mw), Ltc Kenneth M. Murchison; 57th North Carolina: Col Archibald C. Godwin (w); 1st Battalion North Carolina Sharpshooters: Maj Rufus W. Wharton
Early's Division; MG Jubal A. Early	Smith's Brigade BG William Smith	13th Virginia: Ltc James B. Terrill; 49th Virginia: Ltc Jonathan C. Gibson; 52nd Virginia: Col Michael G. Harman; 58th Virginia: Col Francis H. Board
Early's Division; MG Jubal A. Early	Hays' Brigade BG Harry T. Hays	5th Louisiana: Col Henry Forno; 6th Louisiana: Col William Monaghan; 7th Louisiana: Col Davidson B. Penn (c); 8th Louisiana: Col Trevanion D. Lewis (c); 9th Louisiana: Col Leroy A. Stafford (c)
Early's Division; MG Jubal A. Early	Andrews' Artillery Battalion Ltc Richard S. Andrews	Brown's (Maryland) battery: Cpt William D. Brown; Carpenter's (Virginia) battery: Cpt Joseph C. Carpenter; Dement's (Maryland) battery: Cpt William F. Dement; Raine's (Virginia) battery: Cpt Charles J. Raine
Trimble's Division; BG Raleigh E. Colston	Paxton's Brigade BG Elisha F. Paxton (k); Col John H. S. Funk	2nd Virginia: Col John Q. A. Nadenbousch (w), Ltc Raleigh T. Colston; 4th Virginia: Maj William Terry; 5th Virginia: Col John H. S. Funk, Ltc Hazael J. Williams; 27th Virginia: Col James K. Edmondson (w), Ltc Daniel M. Shriver; 33rd Virginia: Ltc Abraham Spengler
Trimble's Division; BG Raleigh E. Colston	Jones' Brigade BG John R. Jones; Col Thomas S. Garnett (mw); Col Alexander S. Vandeventer	21st Virginia: Maj John B. Moseley; 42nd Virginia: Ltc Robert W. Withers; 44th Virginia: Maj Norvell Cobb (w), Cpt Thomas R. Buckner; 48th Virginia: Col Thomas S. Garnett, Maj Oscar White; 50th Virginia: Col Alexander S. Vandeventer, Maj Lynville J. Perkins
Trimble's Division; BG Raleigh E. Colston	Colston's Brigade Col E. T. H. Warren (w); Col Titus V. Williams (w); Ltc Hamilton A. Brown	1st North Carolina: Col John A. McDowell (w), Cpt Jarrette N. Harrell (w), Cpt Louis C. Latham; 3rd North Carolina: Ltc Stephen D. Thruston (w), Maj William M. Parsley; 10th Virginia: Ltc Samuel T. Walker (k), Maj Joshua Stover (mw), Cpt A. H. Smals; 23rd Virginia: Ltc Simeon T. Walton; 37th Virginia: Col Titus V. Williams
Trimble's Division; BG Raleigh E. Colston	Nicholls' Brigade BG Francis T. Nicholls (w); Col Jesse M. Williams	1st Louisiana: Cpt Edward D. Willett; 2nd Louisiana: Col Jesse M. Williams, Ltc Ross E. Burke; 10th Louisiana: Ltc John M. Legett (k), Cpt Auguste Perrodin; 14th Louisiana: Ltc David Zable; 15th Louisiana: Cpt William C. Michie
Trimble's Division; BG Raleigh E. Colston	Jones' Artillery Battalion Ltc Hilary P. Jones	Carrington's (Virginia) battery: Cpt James McD. Carrington; Garber's (Virginia) battery: Lt Alexander H. Fultz; Latimer's (Virginia) battery: Cpt William A. Tanner; Louisiana Guard Battery: Cpt Charles Thompson
Artillery Reserve	Brown's Battalion Col J. Thompson Brown; Cpt David Watson; Cpt Willis J. Dance	Brooke's (Virginia) battery: Cpt James V. Brooke; Dance's (Virginia) battery: Cpt Willis J. Dance; Graham's (Virginia) battery: Cpt Archibald Graham; Hupp's (Virginia) battery: Cpt Abraham Hupp; Smith's (Virginia) battery: Cpt Benjamin H. Smith, Jr.; Watson's (Virginia) battery: Cpt David Watson
Artillery Reserve	McIntosh's Battalion Maj David G. McIntosh	Hurt's (Alabama) battery: Cpt William P. Hurt; Johnson's (Virginia) battery: Cpt Marmaduke Johnson; Lusk's (Virginia) battery: Cpt John A. M. Lusk; Wooding's (Virginia) battery: Cpt George W. Wooding

=== Army Reserve Artillery ===
Division	Battalions	Batteries
Army Reserve Artillery; BG William N. Pendleton	Cutt's Battalion Ltc Allen S. Cutts	Ross' (Georgia) battery: Cpt Hugh M. Ross; Patterson's (Georgia) battery: Cpt George M. Patterson
Army Reserve Artillery; BG William N. Pendleton	Nelson's Battalion Ltc William Nelson	Kirkpatrick's (Virginia) battery: Cpt Thomas J. Kirkpatrick; Massie's (Virginia) battery: Cpt John L. Massie; Milledge's (Georgia) battery: Cpt John Milledge, Jr.

=== Cavalry ===
Division	Brigade	Regiments and Others
Stuart's Division; MG J. E. B. Stuart	Fitzhugh Lee's Brigade BG Fitzhugh Lee	1st Virginia: Col James H. Drake; 2nd Virginia: Col Thomas T. Munford; 3rd Virginia: Col Thomas H. Owen; 4th Virginia: Col Williams C. Wickham
Stuart's Division; MG J. E. B. Stuart	William H. F. Lee's Brigade BG William H. F. Lee	2nd North Carolina: Ltc William H. F. Payne; 5th Virginia: Col Thomas L. Rosser; 9th Virginia: Col Richard L. T. Beale; 10th Virginia: Col J. Lucius Davis; 13th Virginia: Col John R. Chambliss, Jr.; 15th Virginia: Ltc John Critcher
Stuart's Division; MG J. E. B. Stuart	Horse Artillery Maj Robert F. Beckham	Moorman's (Virginia) battery: Cpt Marcellus N. Moorman; Breathed's (Virginia) battery: Cpt James Breathed; McGregor's (Virginia) battery: Cpt William M. McGregor; Hart's (South Carolina) battery: Cpt James F. Hart
