= 8th Florida Infantry Regiment =

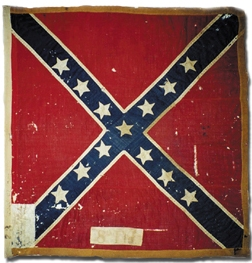
- Active: 1861 – April 10, 1865
- Country: Confederate States of America
- Branch: Confederate States Army
- Role: Infantry
- Part of: Army of Northern Virginia
- Engagements: American Civil War

Commanders
- Notable commanders: Col. Richard F. Floyd; Lt.Col. Georges A. Coppens (temporary); Col. David Lang; Lt.Col. William Baya

The 8th Florida Infantry Regiment was a unit of the Confederate States Army during the American Civil War. Serving in the Army of Northern Virginia throughout the war; it fought in most battles of the Eastern Theater.

In the summer of 1862, the 8th Florida was organized in Lake City. It was deployed to Virginia with 950 combat effectives and assigned to Edward A. Perry's newly formed Florida Brigade alongside the 2nd and 5th Florida regiments. Perry's Brigade served in Anderson’s Division of the First Corps, Army of Northern Virginia under Lt. Gen. James Longstreet.

They fought in the Battles of Second Manassas, Sharpsburg, and Antietam from August–September 1862. Colonel David Lang took over command of the Florida Brigade and led them at Fredericksburg in December 1862 and Chancellorsville in May 1863. Under Col. Lang's command the Florida Brigade fought at Gettysburg in July 1863. They were attached to Pickett's Division, and took part in the famous attack on the Union center on the third day.

After the Battles of the Wilderness and Spotsylvania in 1864, the brigade was joined by the victors of the Battle of Olustee, the 9th, 10th, and 11th Infantry regiments. General Joseph Finegan, the famous commander of Florida forces at Olustee, took command of the Florida Brigade, hence also known as “Finegan’s Brigade”.

In the last year of war the Florida Brigade fought at Cold Harbor in June 1864 and Petersburg during the winter. The brigade retreated with the Army of Northern Virginia and surrendered at Appomattox Courthouse on April 9, 1865. By the time of surrender, the regiments were the size of modern-day platoons or companies. The 2nd, 5th, and 8th surrendered 68, 53, and 32 men respectively. The 9th, 10th, and 11th surrendered 124, 162, and 23. Most of the 11th had been cut off in the army’s retreat and had previously surrendered.

== Engagements and Battles ==
1862

- Battle of 2nd Bull Run, August 28—30, 1862.
- Battle of Antietam, September 17, 1862.
- Battle of Fredericksburg, December 13, 1862.

1863

- Battle of Chancellorsville, May 1—4, 1863.
- Battle of Gettysburg, July 1—3, 1863.
- Bristoe Campaign, October 1863.
- Mine Run Campaign, November—December. 1863.

1864-1865

- Battle of the Wilderness, May 5–6, 1864.
- Battle of Spotsylvania Court House, May 8—21, 1864.
- Battle of North Anna, May 22—26, 1864.
- Battle of Cold Harbor, June 1—3, 1864.
- Petersburg Siege, June 1864—April 1865.
- Weldon Railroad, June 23, 1864.
- Ream's Station, June 30, 1864.
- Battle of Globe Tavern, August 21, 1864.
- Battle of Hatcher's Run, February 5–7, 1865. Farmville, April 7, 1865.
- Battle of Appomattox Court House, April 9, 1865.

== See also ==
- List of Florida Civil War Confederate Units
