= Battle of Chancellorsville order of battle =

The order of battle for the Battle of Chancellorsville includes:

- Battle of Chancellorsville order of battle: Confederate
- Battle of Chancellorsville order of battle: Union
