= Battle of the Wilderness order of battle =

The order of battle for the Battle of the Wilderness includes:

- Battle of the Wilderness order of battle: Confederate
- Battle of the Wilderness order of battle: Union
