= Battle of Cold Harbor order of battle =

The order of battle for the Battle of Cold Harbor includes:

- Battle of Cold Harbor order of battle: Confederate
- Battle of Cold Harbor order of battle: Union
