= Georges De Coppens =

Confederate Army officer (1836–1862)

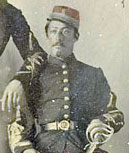
- A tinted ambrotype of Georges De Coppens.
- Born: April 7, 1835; La Trinité, Martinique
- Died: September 17, 1862 (aged 27); Sharpsburg, Maryland
- Education: French Naval Academy
- Spouse: Victoire Bellocq De Coppens
- Children: 2
- Military career
- Allegiance: Confederate States
- Branch: Confederate States Army
- Service years: 1861 - 1862
- Rank: Lieutenant Colonel
- Commands: 1st Louisiana Zouave Battalion
- Conflicts: American Civil War

Georges Augustus Gaston De Coppens (April 7, 1835–September 7, 1862) was a French Confederate States Army officer during the American Civil War. He organized and commanded the 1st Louisiana Zouave Battalion (Coppens' Zouaves) leading them through the early engagements of the war. He was killed in action during the Battle of Antietam while serving as the temporary field commander of the 8th Florida Infantry Regiment.

== Early life ==
George De Coppens was born on April 7, 1835, in the French Caribbean town of La Trinité, Martinique to Rose Montet and Baron Auguste de Coppens, a wealthy aristocrat and plantation owner on the island. Coppens was raised mainly in Dunkirk, France and was a graduate of the French Naval Academy.

The family immigrated to New Orleans in 1854 after the French government banned slavery in all their colonial territories. Baron Auguste De Coppens had liquidated his Caribbean assets, became an investor, and integrated his family into Creole elite of the city. He married Victoire Charlotte Coralie Bellocq with the couple having two children. He fought a duel with cavalry sabers against opera critic Émile Bozonier, who had accused him of heckling a favorite soprano.

== Civil War ==
Shortly after the formation of the Confederate States, Coppens travelled to the capital Montgomery, Alabama to meet with President Jefferson Davis. He petitioned Davis for an officer's commission based on his military academy education and was granted a commission as a lieutenant colonel and the permission to raise a Zouave battalion. He put family members into positions in the battalion with his father serving as quartermaster for much of the war. His younger brother, Marie Alfred, commanded Company F, and Leon, another brother, was a sergeant. Six companies were organized for twelve months service at Pensacola, under Lieutenant Colonel Georges Auguste Gaston Coppens and Major Waldemar Hylested. Two of Colonel Coppens's brothers served in the battalion and his father, Baron August de Coppens, served as Quartermaster. His 1st Louisiana Zouaves joined the Army of Northern Virginia during the Peninsula Campaign. At the Battle of Sharpsburg, Coppens was put in temporary command of the 8th Florida Infantry Regiment. He does not show up in records again until he was listed in the casualties.
