= 11th Florida Infantry Regiment =

- Active: June 1864 – April 10, 1865
- Country: Confederate States of America
- Allegiance: Florida
- Branch: Confederate States Army
- Role: Infantry
- Part of: Army of Northern Virginia
- Engagements: American Civil War

Commanders
- Notable commanders: Col. Theodore W. Brevard Jr.

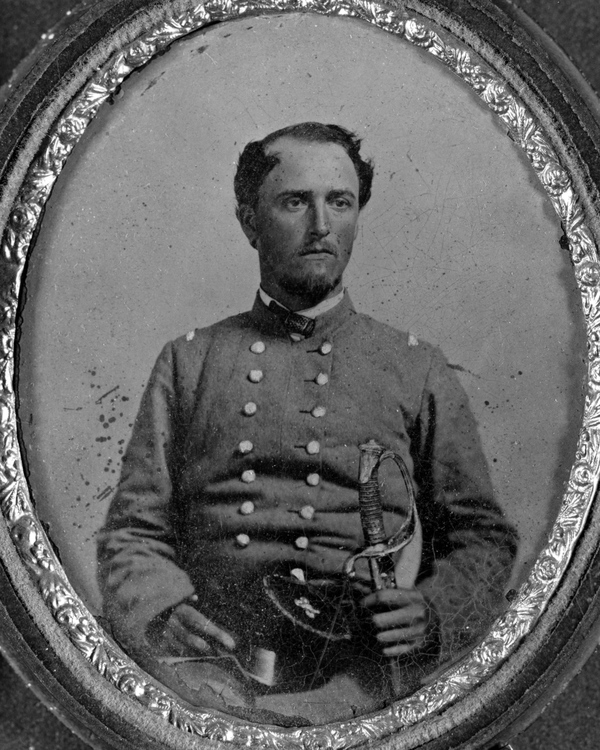
Col. Theodore W. Brevard Jr.

The 11th Florida Infantry Regiment was an infantry regiment from Florida that served in the Confederate States Army from 1864 to 1865.

The 11th Infantry Regiment was organized in June 1864 by consolidating part of the 2nd and the 4th Florida Infantry Battalions. Many of the men serving in the regiment were recruited in Hendry, Jackson, and Bradford counties.

The 11th Infantry was placed in the Florida Brigade alongside the 2nd, 5th, 8th, 9th, and 10th Florida Infantry Regiments under command of General Finegan.

In the last year of war the Florida Brigade fought at Cold Harbor in June 1864 and Petersburg during the winter. The Florida Brigade retreated with the Army of Northern Virginia and surrendered at Appomattox Courthouse on April 9, 1865. By the time of surrender, the regiments were the size of modern-day platoons or companies. The 2nd, 5th, and 8th surrendered 68, 53, and 32 men respectively. The 9th, 10th, and 11th surrendered 124, 162, and 23. Most of the 11th had been cut off in the Army's retreat and had previously surrendered. The 11th Infantry Regiment surrendered 4 officers and 19 men. The field officers were Colonel Theodore W. Brevard Jr., Lieutenant Colonel James F. McClellan, and Major John H. Gee.

== Engagements and Battles ==
1864-1865

- Battle of Cold Harbor, June 1–3, 1864.
- Petersburg Siege, June 1864—April 1865.
- Weldon Railroad, June 23, 1864.
- Ream's Station, June 30, 1864.
- Battle of Globe Tavern, August 21, 1864.
- Battle of Belfield, December 9, 1864.
- Battle of Hatcher's Run, February 5–7, 1865. Farmville, April 7, 1865.
- Appomattox Court House, April 9, 1865.

== See also ==
- Florida Civil War Confederate Units
- Florida National Guard
- 53rd Infantry Brigade Combat Team (United States)
- 124th Infantry Regiment (United States)
