= List of Confederate units from Florida in the American Civil War =

Flag of Florida during the American Civil War

This is a list of Confederate units from Florida in the American Civil War. The list of Florida Union Civil War units is shown separately.

== Infantry ==
- 1st Infantry
- 2nd Infantry
- 3rd Infantry
  - Jacksonville Light Infantry (Company A)
  - Saint Augustine Blues (Company B)
- 4th Infantry
- 5th Infantry
- 6th Infantry
- 7th Infantry
- 8th Infantry
- 9th Infantry
- 10th Infantry
- 11th Infantry
- 1st Infantry Reserves
- 1st (Holland's) Battalion (1st Special Battalion, see 10th Infantry Regiment)
- 2nd Battalion, Infantry
- 6th Battalion, Infantry (see 9th Infantry Regiment)
- Commissary Battalion
- Florida Brigade (Army of Northern Virginia)
- Florida Brigade (Army of Tennessee)

== Cavalry ==
- 1st Cavalry
- 2nd Cavalry
- 3rd Battalion, Cavalry
- 5th (Scott's) Battalion, Cavalry
- 1st (Munnerlyn's) Battalion, Special Cavalry (Cow Cavalry)

== Artillery ==
- Abell's Light Artillery Company
- Dyke's Light Artillery Company
- Kilcrease Light Artillery
- Leon Light Artillery (Gamble's Companies A and B, later Dyke's and Kilcrease)
- Marion Light Artillery (Perry's)
- Milton Light Artillery Company (Dunham's 1st and 2nd Companies, later Dunham's and Abell's)

== See also ==
- Lists of American Civil War Regiments by State
- Confederate Units by State
