= Robert Clayton Maffett =

Confederate Army officer

Robert Clayton Maffett (about 1836 – April 26, 1865) was a colonel in the Confederate States Army during the American Civil War.

== Biography ==
=== Early life ===
Maffett was born in Newberry County, South Carolina. The Maffetts are thought to have arrived in Newberry County in 1772 with a group of immigrants from County Antrim, Ireland, under the leadership of Reverend John Renwick of the Associate Reformed Presbyterian Church. They were part of the massive (25,000) group of landless Scots-Irish who left Ulster in the period 1771–1775 searching for religious freedom and economic opportunity. The Maffetts prospered in their new home and James H. Maffett (1795–1880), Robert's father, was a successful farmer and long-time member of the state legislature.

Robert Maffett's first wife, Ann Lavinia Gallman, died in 1860. He fathered a single child, Florence, who was born in 1856.

=== Civil War ===
With the outbreak of the Civil War, Maffett enrolled in the "Pickens Guards," (Company C of the 3rd South Carolina Volunteer Infantry Regiment) on April 14, 1861, at Frog Level (now Prosperity, South Carolina). He was elected captain. For much of the war, the regiment formed part of Kershaw's Brigade in McLaws' Division of the Army of Northern Virginia under General Robert E. Lee. Maffett and the regiment participated in no less than 28 major engagements. A full 45% (298) of its members were killed and another 698 wounded. Among those killed were six Maffetts from Newberry, South Carolina.

After seeing action at Savage's Station and Malvern Hill, Maffet and the 3rd were held in reserve at Antietam during Lee's first invasion of the North. Later in 1862, Captain Maffett was a patient in Chimborazo Hospital in Richmond while recovering from typhoid fever. In December 1862, at the Battle of Fredericksburg, Maffet, by now a major, and the 3rd were positioned on Mayre's Heights above the famous stonewall manned by Cobb's Legion. Seven of the 3rd's officers were wounded at Fredericksburg, including Maffett. Shortly thereafter, his wounds not being serious, he returned home to marry Sarah Halfacre.

In April 1863, the 3rd was engaged in the Battle of Chancellorsville. On the last day of fighting, somewhere in the deep woods, Major Maffett and several other members of the 3rd were captured by members of the 122nd Pennsylvania. The Pennsylvanians tried to convince Maffett to surrender his sword peacefully, but the major refused to do so except to an officer of similar rank. Private Henry Nixdorf pointed a rifle at Maffett and said, "Are you going to unstrap that sword, or rather take the consequences of being run through with this bayonet?" Maffett reluctantly surrendered his pearl-handled dress sword. Maffett soon escaped his captors in the confusion of battle and what happened to his sword is unrecorded.

In June 1863, the South Carolinians, a part of the First Corps of James Longstreet, were camped near the small Pennsylvania college town of Gettysburg. On July 2, the second day of the battle, the soldiers of Kershaw's Brigade leapt over a stone wall in an unsuccessful attempt to silence Federal artillery along the Wheatfield Road. The 3rd and 7th South Carolina proceeded straight across the Rose Farm to the Stony Hill. A Federal counterattack soon drove them back. From Major Maffett's battle report, "In this position the enemy advanced to within 30 yards of us, and, for more than one hour we held him in check, notwithstanding the repeated reinforcements brought up by him." The 3rd South Carolina itself was reinforced by 40 men of the 5th Georgia. He continued, "We remained in this position, under a heavy fire of musketry at short range in front, and an enfilading fire of grape and shrapnel from batteries that the left had failed entirely in silencing, until about dusk, when we were ordered by General Kershaw back to another line a short distance in our rear. Thus ended the fight for the day."

In September 1863, the 3rd was in northern Georgia at the Battle of Chickamauga. It was heavily engaged at Snodgrass Hill, where Union General William H. Thomas made his famous stand, thus saving the Union Army from total collapse. After participating in the Battle of Knoxville, the 3rd returned to Virginia and saw action in 1864 at the Battle of the Wilderness, where Col. James D. Nance, commander of the 3rd was killed. Afterwards, Maffett was promoted to lieutenant colonel.

On August 26, 1864, while on picket line in Halltown, West Virginia, Lt. Col. Maffett and about 100 men of the 15th South Carolina were captured by Philip H. Sheridan's Federal cavalry. He was sent to the military prison at Fort Delaware in the middle of the Delaware River in New Jersey. He died there of chronic dysentery on April 26, 1865, just seven days after the surrender of General Lee's army at Appomattox Courthouse. The only comment other than the cause of his death was that he "left no effects." The location of his grave is unknown.
