= David Lang (Civil War) =

American military figure and politician

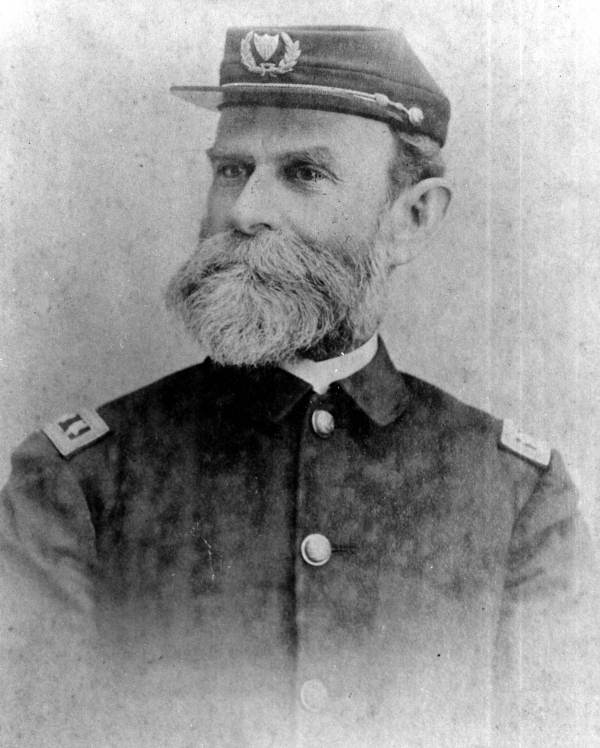
- Born: May 9, 1838; Camden County, Georgia
- Died: December 13, 1917 (aged 79); Tallahassee, Florida
- Burial place: Old City Cemetery, Tallahassee, Florida
- Military career
- Allegiance: Confederate States of America; United States of America
- Branch: Confederate States Army; Florida Militia
- Service years: 1861–65 (CSA); 1885–93 (Florida Militia)
- Rank: Colonel; Major General
- Commands: 8th Florida Infantry; Florida Militia
- Campaigns: American Civil War: Battle of Antietam; Battle of Fredericksburg; Battle of Chancellorsville; Gettysburg campaign; Bristoe Campaign; Mine Run Campaign; Overland Campaign; Battle of Appomattox Court House
- Other work: Florida state representative (1885–1894); Florida Adjutant General (1885–1893)

David Lang (May 9, 1838 – December 13, 1917) was a land surveyor, Confederate States Army officer during the American Civil War, and Florida politician.

== Early life ==
Lang was born in Camden County, Georgia. He attended the Georgia Military Institute in Marietta, graduating in the Class of 1857 and ranked 4th of 16. He moved to Suwannee County, Florida, and became a surveyor.

== Civil War ==
With the secession of Florida and the outbreak of the Civil War, Lang enlisted in the Confederate Army on April 2, 1861, as a private in Company H of the 1st Florida Infantry. Barely over a month later, he was promoted to sergeant. He was discharged in April 1862 after his term of enlistment expired. In May, Lang enrolled in the 8th Florida Infantry and was commissioned as captain of Company C. He was wounded at the Battle of Antietam in September and again at the Battle of Fredericksburg in December. Stationed in the town of Fredericksburg, Lang's men stubbornly contested Federal attempts to lay pontoon bridges across the Rappahannock River. An artillery shell fragment struck the chimney of the building that Lang occupied, and a large chunk of masonry struck him in the head, gravely injuring him.

Recovering from his wounds, Lang was promoted to colonel of the 8th Florida on April 30, 1863, and fought at the Battle of Chancellorsville, where his brigade commander, Brig. Gen. Edward A. Perry, was stricken with typhoid fever. Lang led Perry's Florida Brigade during the Gettysburg campaign. On July 2, 1863, he attacked the center of the Union defensive line on Cemetery Ridge, advancing past the Codori farm before being repulsed by troops from the II Corps. On the following day, the brigade supported Pickett's Charge, but failed to advance far under heavy fire from Lt. Col. Freeman McGilvery's line of artillery. All told, the brigade fought well and lost about 60% of its 700+ soldiers.

With General Perry's return, Lang returned to command of the 8th Florida, leading the regiment in the Bristoe and Mine Run campaigns of 1863.

The spring campaign of 1864 commenced with the Battle of the Wilderness, where Lang commanded his 8th Florida regiment on the first day of the battle (May 5); but when General Perry sustained a severe wound on May 6, command of the Florida Brigade once again devolved unto Lang.

Lang would command the Brigade for the next three weeks (May 6–28) of the Overland Campaign, leading it during the Battles of Spotsylvania Court House and North Anna, as part of Brig. Gen. William Mahone's division in Lt. Gen. A.P. Hill's Third Corps.

On May 28, Lang's three-regiment Florida Brigade was reinforced by a brigade of four Florida battalions under Brig. Gen. Joseph Finegan, just arriving from Florida. Finegan assumed command of the augmented Florida Brigade, and Lang again reverted back to regimental command.

Lang led the brigade again briefly at the Battle of Cold Harbor.

Perry had to leave the Army of Northern Virginia because of his wounds, Brig. Gen. Joseph Finegan and then Brig. Gen. Theodore W. Brevard, Jr. led the Floridians. However, by the end of the war, Brevard having been captured, Lang was again leading the Florida Brigade, surrendering it at Appomattox Court House on April 9, 1865.

== Postbellum career ==
After the cessation of hostilities, Lang returned to Florida and became a civil engineer. He married Mary "Mollie" Quarles Campbell on February 28, 1866, and fathered four children. He was elected as a state representative from Tallahassee, Florida, from 1885 until 1893. He served an eight-year tenure as Florida's Adjutant General during the administrations of Governors Perry and Fleming (1885–1894). He was influential in the reorganization and training of Florida's state militia troops, which contributed to the creation of Florida's modern National Guard. Serving as major general, he led efforts in increase funding and pay rates for the troops.

Lang returned to the Gettysburg Battlefield in 1895 to help stake out the location for the Florida state monument. He resumed his political career, serving in the legislature until 1901, then served as a private secretary to Florida Governors Henry L. Mitchell and William D. Bloxham. Lang was also Cashier of the Florida State Hospital.

Lang was among the last brigade commanders of the Third Corps of the Army of Northern Virginia to die. He was buried in the Old City Cemetery in Tallahassee.

== Honors ==
The David Lang Camp #1314 of the Sons of Confederate Veterans in Tallahassee was named in his honor.
