= 2nd Florida Infantry Regiment =

Confederate States Army infantry regiment

- Active: July 1861 – April 10, 1865
- Country: Confederate States of America
- Allegiance: Florida
- Branch: Confederate States Army
- Role: Infantry
- Part of: Army of Northern Virginia
- Engagements: American Civil War

Commanders
- Notable commanders: George Taliafero Ward; Edward A. Perry

The 2nd Florida Infantry Regiment was an infantry regiment that fought in service of the Confederate States Army in the American Civil War.

== History ==
The 2nd Florida was organized near Jacksonville, Florida on July 13, 1861, and mustered into Confederate service for a twelve-month term of enlistment with a total of one 1,185 officers and enlisted men. The regiment fielded twelve companies in total, two more than were typically authorized for an infantry regiment.The unit elected George T. Ward as its commander. Records indicate that the unit, at its founding, had an average age of twenty-three. Roughly 3% of the unit was Northern-born, including future regimental commander, Edward A. Perry. About 7% were Foreign-born; fourteen from Ireland, seven from Germany or Prussia, three from England, and one each from Canada, Cuba, Italy, Norway, and Russia. A further 3% were of Hispanic descent.

In the summer of 1861, the regiment was sent to the Eastern Theater of the war and placed in the Confederacy's main army in Virginia. After arriving in Richmond on July 21, 1861, the 2nd Florida spent the next few weeks drilling and guarding Union soldiers captured after the First Battle of Manassas.

Lewis Powell, one of John Wilkes Booth's co-conspirators, lied and stated that he was 19 years old (rather than his true age of 17) in order to enlist with the Jasper Blues, Company I of the regiment. It was during their deployment in Richmond that Powell is believed to have met Booth. He secured a pass one evening and went into the city to see a play in which Booth was one of the actors.

The regiment first saw combat the following year during the Siege of Yorktown. It was at the Williamsburg, on May 5, 1862, that Col. Ward was shot and killed. Several days later, the unit voted to elect Edward A. Perry as their commander. The unit also participated in the battles of Seven Pines, Gaines Mill, and Malvern Hill.

Following the Peninsula Campaign, the 2nd Florida was assigned to the newly formed Florida Brigade alongside the 5th and 8th Florida. The 2nd Florida's Colonel Perry was promoted to brigadier general and given command of the brigade. Perry's Brigade served under Anderson's Division of Longstreet's First Corps, of the Army of Northern Virginia.

As a component of Perry's Brigade, the 2nd Florida continued to serve through the Army of Northern Virginia's campaigns. Through the remainder of 1862, the regiment participated in the Battles of Second Manassas in August, Battle of Antietam in September, and Fredericksburg in December. In May 1863, the 2nd Florida fought in the Battle of Chancellorsville. As the Army of Northern Virginia began preparations for its invasion of Pennsylvania, Brig. Gen. Perry fell ill with typhoid and command of the Florida Brigade devolved to Colonel David Lang of the 8th. The Florida Brigade was engaged at the Battle of Gettysburg and participated in Pickett's Charge on the battle's third and final day.

After the Battles of the Wilderness and Spotsylvania in 1864, the brigade was joined by the victors of the Battle of Olustee, the 9th, 10th, and 11th Regiments. Brigadier General Joseph Finegan, the commander of Florida forces at Olustee, took command of the Florida Brigade.

The remainder of 1864 saw the 2nd Florida fight at the Battle of Cold Harbor in June and settle into static defenses at the Siege of Petersburg. Following the fall of Petersburg and Richmond the following spring, the Florida Brigade retreated with the Army of Northern Virginia and surrendered at Appomattox Court House on April 9, 1865. By the time of surrender, the regiments of the brigade were dramatically understrength. The 2nd, 5th, and 8th surrendered 68, 53, and 32 men respectively. The 9th, 10th, and 11th surrendered 124, 162, and 23. Most of the 11th had been cut off in the Army's retreat and had previously surrendered.

On May 2, 1905, Florida held a celebration to honor the U.S. government returning the 2nd Florida's battle flag to the state.

== Companies ==
Company	County	Nickname	Commanders
A	Escambia	Pensacola Rifle Rangers	Captains Edward A. Perry and W.D. Ballantine
B	Alachua	Alachua Guards	Captains Lew. Williams and R.G. Jerkins
C	Columbia	Columbia Rifles	Captains Walter R. Moore and H.E. Stokes
D	Leon	Leon Rifles	Captains Theodore W. Brevard Jr. and M.J.C. Musgrove
E	Marion	Hammock Guards	Captains John D. Hopkins, William E. McCaslin, James H. Johnson, and Patrick P.L. Todd
F	Jackson	Gulf States Guards	Captains James F. McClellan, J. Henry Pooser, Tillinghast Harrison, and Ben F. Watts
G	St. John	St. John's Grays	Captains J. Jacquelin Daniels, Charles F. Flagg, Thomas M. Brown, and C. Seton Fleming
H	Putnam	St. Augustine Rifles	Captains John W. Starke, Alexander Moseley, and A. M. Carlisle
I	Hamilton	Jasper Blues	Captains Henry J. Stewart and Moses L. Duncan
K	Nassau	Davis Guards	Captains George W. Call, A.C. Butler, and John B.G. Oneil
L	Madison	Madison Rangers	Captains William P. Pillans, Thomas A. Perry, W. H. H. Rogers, and W. H. Croom
M	Hamilton	Howell Guards	Captains George W. Parkhill, Richard C. Parkhill, Elliott L. Hampton, Amos Whitehead, John Day Perkins, and Julian Betton

== Engagements and Battles ==
1862

- Yorktown Siege, April—May 1862.
- Battle of Williamsburg, May 5, 1862.
- Battle of Seven Pines, May 31—June. 1, 1862.
- Seven Days Battles, June 25—July 1, 1862.
- Battle of Beaver Dam Creek, June 26, 1862. Gaines' Mill, June 27, 1862.
- Battle of Glendale (Frayser's Farm), June 30, 1862.
- Battle of 2nd Bull Run, August 28–30, 1862.
- Battle of Antietam, September 17, 1862.
- Battle of Fredericksburg, December 13, 1862.

1863

- Battle of Chancellorsville, May 1–4, 1863.
- Battle of Gettysburg, July 1–3, 1863.
- Bristoe Campaign, October 1863.
- Mine Run Campaign, November—December. 1863.

1864-1865

- The Wilderness, May 5–6, 1864.
- Battle of Spotsylvania Court House, May 8—21, 1864.
- Battle of North Anna, May 22–26, 1864.
- Battle of Cold Harbor, June 1–3, 1864.
- Petersburg Siege, June 1864—April 1865.
- Weldon Railroad, June 23, 1864.
- Ream's Station, June 30, 1864.
- Battle of Globe Tavern, August 21, 1864.
- Battle of Belfield, December 9, 1864.
- Battle of Hatcher's Run, February 5–7, 1865. Farmville, April 7, 1865.
- Appomattox Court House, April 9, 1865.

== Assignments ==
- Army of the Peninsula, September 1861.
- Gen. Gabriel Rains' division, Army of the Peninsula, December 1861-April 1862.
- Ward's Command, Gen. Daniel Harvey Hill's division, Department of Northern Virginia, April–May 1862.
- Gen. John Garland's Brigade, Daniel H. Hill's Division, Department of Northern Virginia, May–June 1862.
- Gen. Roger Pryor's brigade, Gen. James Longstreet's 1st Division, Army of Northern Virginia, June–July 1862.
- Gen. Roger Pryor's brigade, James Longstreet's 1st Division, First Corps, Army of Northern Virginia, July- September 1862.
- Gen. Atkinson Pryor's and Gen. Edward A. Perry's brigade, Gen. R. H. Anderson's division, First Corps, Army of Northern Virginia, September 1862 - May 1863.
- Gen. Atkinson Pryor's and Gen. Joseph Finegan's brigade, Gen. Richard Anderson's and Gen. William Mahone's Division, Third Corps, Army of Northern Virginia, May 1863-April 1865.

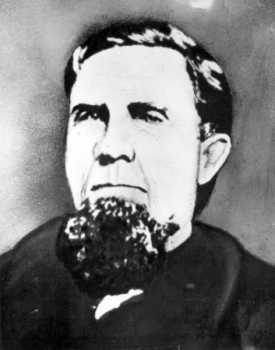
Colonel George T. Ward

Officers of the 2nd Infantry Regiment
Rank	Name
Colonel	George Taliafero Ward (Leon Co.)
Colonel	Edward A. Perry (Escambia Co.)
Lt. Col.	Samuel St. George Rogers (Marion Co.)
Major	William T. Ballantine
Major	George W. Call (Madison Co.)
Major	Walter R. Moore (Columbia Co.)
Major	Lewis G. Pyles (Alachua Co.)

== See also ==
- Florida Civil War Confederate Units
- Florida National Guard
- 53rd Infantry Brigade Combat Team (United States)
- 124th Infantry Regiment (United States)
