= 11th Georgia Infantry Regiment =

Infantry regiment of the Confederate States Army

The 11th Georgia Infantry Regiment was a Confederate States Army unit during the American Civil War. The regiment was part of the Army of Northern Virginia. Apart from a period when it was detached as part of Longstreet's forces in Georgia and Tennessee, the regiment remained with the army and took part in several major battles including the Seven Days Battles, Sharpsburg, Gettysburg, Cold Harbor and the siege of Petersburg until it surrendered at Appomattox on April 9, 1865.

== The 11th throughout the war ==
The 11th Georgia was raised in spring of 1861 and mustered into service in July 1861 having recruited from several counties including Fannin, Gilmer, Hall, Houston, Lee, Murray, Quitman and Walton counties. Company H of the 11th Georgia Infantry was formed in Walton County by Captain George T. Anderson who was promoted to Colonel when they were mustered into service in Atlanta, Georgia on July 3, 1861. The company was taken to the fairgrounds at Richmond by railway shortly after being mustered. They stayed there until July 15 while being drilled, of which many wrote of the dislike of the way they were handled. Kittrell J. Warren wrote of this and made somewhat of a joke, towards the end of describing their feelings during the time, when he referred to it as a "brief, bright period of our sojourn at the fair grounds." Clearly pointing out that their stay there was among the best that they had experienced during their service throughout the war despite their complaints. After this period, the regiment made its long grueling march to war at the first battle of Manassas. They arrived late by one day to Manassas due to an accident on the road in which three regiments cars had a collision as written by Captain Nunnally of Company H and by Kittrell J. Warren.

After missing the battle at Manassas, the 11th Georgia Infantry went into quarters at Center Hill, Virginia, where they spent most of the winter at the camp and lost men due to discharge as well as death resulting of illness. In February 1862 Lieutenant Henry D. McDaniel returned to Georgia for recruits as a result of their losses over the course of winter. He, as well as the new recruits, joined the regiment at Orange Court House, Virginia. The army was then transported by sailboat along the James River to King's Landing before setting out on a march to Dams one, two, and three. Dam three had been taken from a South Carolinian brigade after the commanding officer had been slain and the brigade had fled. It fell upon the newly arrived forces to which the 11th belonged to retake the Breastworks and recover the stolen battery. They succeeded and were ordered back to Richmond shortly after to assist in the defense of the city. These battles came to be known as the Seven Days Battles. It was a Confederate victory as McClellan backed down near the James River after suffering sixteen thousand in casualties. After the Seven Days Battles they made their way towards Manassas in which they partook in the second battle of Manassas and forced them into Winchester. Lee’s army reengaged the enemy near the Potomac and drove them across. After this the army, as well as the 11th Georgia, made their way towards Fredericksburg in the Shenandoah Valley.

The 11th Georgia made it to Fredericksburg several days prior to the battle commencing. The heaviest fighting was to the sides of the 11th Georgia as they themselves admit in what writings still remain from the members of the regiment. After the battle they then entered winter quarters for the second time in December 1862 where they stayed until March. They were then ordered to Norfolk and Suffolk where they participated in brief fighting south of Petersburg before being ordered back to Lee's main forces at Chancellorsville. They arrived a day late to the battle and discovered that Stonewall Jackson had been shot by his own men in confusion when returning from a scouting mission. He died eight days after his injuries due to complications caused by pneumonia. After this incident Lee began recruiting for his Pennsylvania and Maryland campaigns, of which the 11th Georgia took part in both.

The army as well as the 11th Georgia began their march in June 1863. The first parts of the army reached Gettysburg on the first and commenced combat with the Union forces. The portion that the 11th was in arrived on the morning of the second and was immediately ordered into the far right side of Lee's army in which they immediately engaged in combat. During this combat Captain Nunnally of Company H was killed. The 11th continued their push regardless and suffered moderate casualties. They managed to force the enemy forces through Devil's Den and over a small mountain as well as managing to capture a battery. On the third, the 11th Georgia had fallen back and held their lines while exchanging cannon fire and moderate rifle fire. There are some writings mentioning what they later realized was Pickett's Charge where it seemed all artillery on both sides seemed to be firing at once, which was quite accurate as the Confederates had opened up the Great Battery upon the Union forces that were held up atop cemetery hill. Not long after this, the army retreated despite valiant efforts from all troops. The 11th Georgia even repelling and forcing back attackers that had forced their own cavalry over their positions.

== Regiments that fought alongside the 11th Georgia Infantry ==
The brigade under Brig. Gen. G.T.Anderson, the former colonel, was composed of the 7th, 8th, 9th and 11th Georgia Infantry regiments as well as the 1st Kentucky Infantry Regiment. The 59th Georgia Infantry was later put in for the 1st Kentucky which was transferred to another brigade.

== Deaths of officers of the 11th Georgia Infantry ==
- Captain E. W. Jackson
- Captain John W. Stokes (Gettysburg 1863)
- Captain Matthew T. Nunnally (July 3, 1863)
- Lieutenant George S. Burson (August 30)
- Lieutenant John B. Guerry (August 30)

== Strength and casualties ==
From an original mustered strength of 573, the regiment fielded 140 at Sharpsburg having lost a good number of men to illness during the winter of 1861–1862, 310 at Gettysburg, where it suffered 65% casualties, and suffered 110 casualties at Cold Harbor. At the time of surrender the strength of the regiment was 16 officers and 176 enlisted men.

== See also ==
- List of Civil War regiments from Georgia

== Sources ==
- 11th Georgia Volunteer Infantry Regiment
- Company K, 11th GA - Houston County Volunteers
- 'Personal Reminiscences' Houston Home Journal April 26, 1883
- 'War Casualties' Houston Home Journal Thu. June 4, 1891
