= 55th Virginia Infantry Regiment =

- Flag of Virginia, 1861
- Active: September 1861 – April 1865
- Disbanded: April 1865
- Country: Confederacy
- Allegiance: Confederate States of America
- Branch: Confederate States Army
- Type: Infantry
- Engagements: American Civil War: Seven Days' Battles; Second Battle of Bull Run; Battle of Antietam; Battle of Fredericksburg; Battle of Chancellorsville; Battle of Gettysburg; Overland Campaign; Siege of Petersburg; Appomattox Campaign

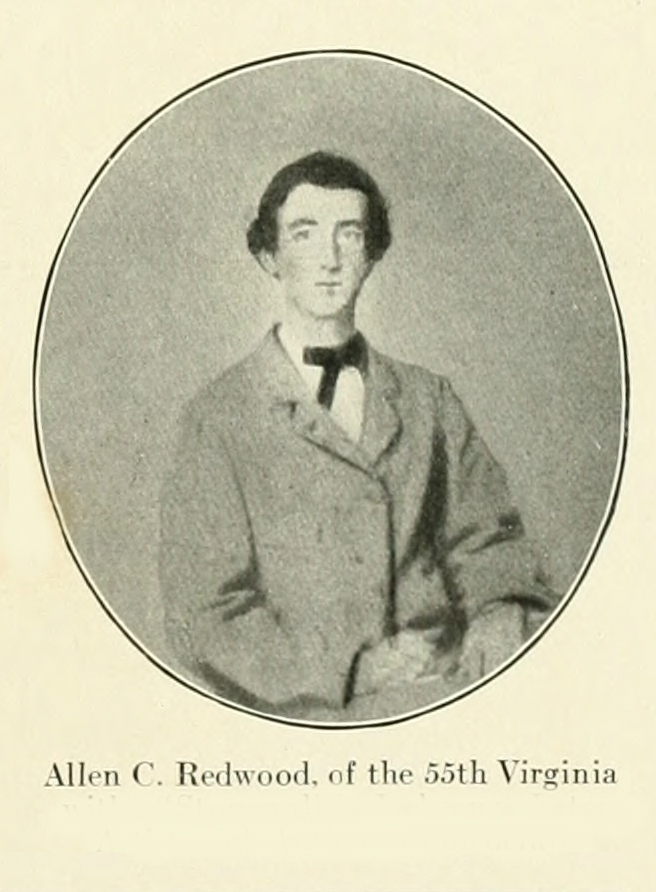

The 55th Virginia Infantry Regiment was an infantry regiment of the Confederate States Army during the American Civil War.

In May 1861, Major William N. Ward raised a unit known as 'Essex and Middlesex Battalion,' one company of which, the 'Essex Sharp Shooters' had been in existence since the summer of 1860 as a volunteer company. It received the formal designation '55th Virginia Infantry' in September 1861 when Colonel Francis M. Mallory took command. It eventually became part of A.P. Hill's Light Division. In total, 1,321 men appeared on the muster rolls; of these, 1,181 saw active service with the regiment. Of the latter, 108 were killed in action and 198 died of disease. The regiment was made up of 12 companies from Essex, Middlesex, Lancaster, Spotsylvania, and Westmoreland counties, although never more than 11 companies served together at one time.

Some of the battles the 55th Virginia engaged in included the Seven Days Battles, Second Battle of Manassas, Fredericksburg, Chancellorsville, and Gettysburg, as well as the defense of Richmond and Petersburg.

Its field officers were Colonels William S. Christian and Francis Mallory; Lieutenant Colonels Robert H. Archer and Evan Rice; and Majors Thomas M. Burke, Robert B. Fauntleroy, Charles N. Lawson, Andrew D. Saunders, and William N. Ward.

== See also ==
- List of Virginia Civil War units
