= 61st Georgia Infantry Regiment =

Infantry regiment of the Confederate States Army

- Active: June, 1861–April, 1865
- Country: Confederate States of America
- Allegiance: Georgia
- Branch: Confederate States Army
- Type: Infantry
- Engagements: American Civil War * Battle of Gaines' Mill * Battle of Cedar Mountain * Second Battle of Manassas * Battle of Sharpsburg (Antietam) * Battle of Fredericksburg * Battle of Chancellorsville * Battle of Gettysburg * Battle of the Wilderness * Battle of Spotsylvania * Valley Campaign of 1864 * Battle of Monocacy * Third Battle of Winchester * Battle of Cedar Creek * Siege of Petersburg * Battle of Fort Stedman * Appomattox Campaign

The 61st Georgia Infantry Regiment was an infantry regiment in the Confederate States Army during the American Civil War.

== History ==
Part of the Lawton-Gordon-Evans Brigade, the 61st Georgia Volunteer Infantry was mustered in South Carolina in May 1862. Its service included the Battle of Gaines' Mill (27 June 1862), Second Manassas (29-30 August 1862), the Battle of Chancellorsville (29 April – 5 May 1863) and the Battle of Gettysburg (1-3 July 1863) among many other battles. Along with the rest of Gordon's brigade, the 61st was among the first Confederate troops to reach the Susquehanna River during the Gettysburg campaign.

George Washington Nichols, in his autobiographical account, A Soldier's Story of His Regiment, depicts life in the 61st Georgia Volunteer Infantry during the Civil War.

=== Staff ===
Colonel

- John H. Lamar

Lieutenant Colonels

- James McDonald
- Charles W. McArthur
- James Y. McDuffie

Majors

- Peter Brenan
- Archibald P. McRae
- Henry Tillman
- James D. Van Valkenburg
- James Bell Smith

Captains

- G.D. Willcox
- D.R.A. Johnson
- Daniel McDonald
- S.H. Kennedy
- Charles W. McArthur
- Peter Brennan
- W. Fannin
- J.M. Dasher
- James D. Van Valkenburg
- E.F. Sharpe
- T.M. McRae
- J.A. Edmondson
- T.T. Colley.

Adjutants

- G.W. Lamar
- G.C. Conner.

Assistant Quartermaster

- George Higgins.

=== Companies ===
- A - "Irwin Cowboys" (Irwin County, Captains Willcox & McDuffie)
- B - "Tattnall Rangers" (Tattnall County, Captains Johnson & A.P. McRae)
- C - "Brooks Rifles" and "Wiregrass Riflemen" (Brooks and Thomas Counties, Captains McDonald & Edmonson)
- D - "DeKalb Guards" (Bulloch County, Captains Kennedy & Tillman)
- E - "Montgomery Sharpshooters" (Montgomery County, Captains McArthur & T.M. McRae)
- F - "The Stark/Starke Guards"
- G - "Wilkes Guards" (Wilkes County, Captains Fannin & Colley)
- H - "Tattnall Volunteers" (Tattnall County, Captain Dasher)
- I - "Thompson Guards" (Macon and Bibb County, Captain Van Valkenburg)
- K - formed with volunteers from Companies A-I (Captain Sharpe)

== See also ==
- List of Civil War regiments from Georgia
