= 9th Alabama Infantry Regiment =

Infantry regiment of the Confederate States Army

- Flag of Alabama in 1861 (obverse and reverse)
- Active: May 1861 to April 1865
- Country: Confederate States of America
- Branch: Confederate States Army
- Type: Infantry
- Engagements: Battle of Seven Pines; Battle of Williamsburg; Second Battle of Bull Run; Battle of Antietam; Battle of Fredericksburg; Battle of Gettysburg; Siege of Petersburg

Commanders
- Notable commanders: Col. Cadmus Wilcox

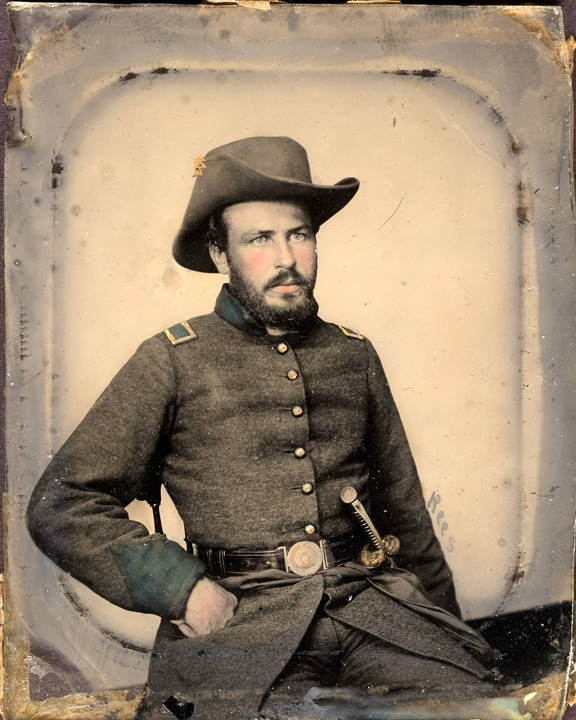
2nd Lieutenant Samuel Adams, Co. G, 9th Alabama Infantry

The 9th Alabama Infantry Regiment was an infantry regiment that served in the Confederate Army during the American Civil War.

== Service ==
The 9th Alabama Infantry Regiment was mustered in at Richmond, Virginia in late May 1861.

The regiment surrendered at Appomattox Court House.

== Total strength and casualties ==
The 9th mustered 1138 men during its existence. It suffered approximately 200 killed in action or mortally wounded and 175 men who died of disease, for a total of approximately 375 fatalities. An additional 208 men were discharged or transferred from the regiment.

== Commanders ==
- Colonel Cadmus Marcellus Wilcox
- Colonel Samuel Henry
- Colonel Joseph Horace King
- Colonel Gaines Chism Smith

== See also ==
- List of Confederate units from Alabama
