= Carpenter's Battery =

Confederate artillery unit in the American Civil War

Carpenter's Battery, also known as Alleghany Artillery or Alleghany Rough Artillery, was a famed Confederate artillery battery unit in the American Civil War. The unit was first organized at Covington, Virginia on April 20, 1861 as Company A of the 27th Virginia Infantry Regiment, the "Alleghany Roughs." When the Captain who organized the company resigned due to ill health, the captaincy devolved upon his First Lieutenant, Joseph Hannah Carpenter, who was born in 1834 at Covington, Virginia, in Alleghany County, Virginia. Carpenter had been an artillery cadet under General Thomas J. "Stonewall" Jackson in the class of 1858 at Virginia Military Institute and legend has it that General Jackson recognized his former student's name on the company muster roll and ordered the company converted to an artillery battery with Carpenter as its captain, thus becoming "Carpenter's Battery."

Among the original members of the company were Joseph's brothers John Cadwalider Carpenter and Samuel Steuben Carpenter. The brothers played a central role in the unit's wartime service. When the company's commissioned officers were reorganized after the First Battle of Manassas, Joseph H. Carpenter became the captain of the battery with John C. Carpenter as his first lieutenant; in a later reorganization John C. Carpenter became the captain of the battery with Samuel S. Carpenter as his second lieutenant. Captain Joseph H. Carpenter was wounded in action on August 9, 1862 at the Battle of Cedar Mountain, and died from the effects of his wound on February 5, 1863 at his parents' home, Fort Carpenter, Virginia. John Cadwalider Carpenter, born in 1839 at Covington, Virginia, served as captain of the battery after his brother Joseph was wounded; he commanded the battery through many engagements, including fifteen major battles, and lost an arm in combat at the Battle of Fisher's Hill, but survived the war.

== See also ==
- List of Virginia Civil War units
