= 3rd North Carolina Infantry Regiment =

Infantry regiment of the Confederate States Army

- Active: April 1861 - 1865
- Country: Confederate States of America
- Branch: Confederate States Army
- Type: Infantry
- Size: Regiment
- Engagements: American Civil War: Battle of Beaver Dam Creek; Battle of Malvern Hill; Battle of Sharpsburg; Battle of Fredericksburg; Battle of Chancellorsville; Second Battle of Winchester; Battle of Gettysburg; Mine Run Campaign

Commanders
- Colonel of the Regiment: William L. DeRosset, Gaston Meares, Stephen D. Thruston

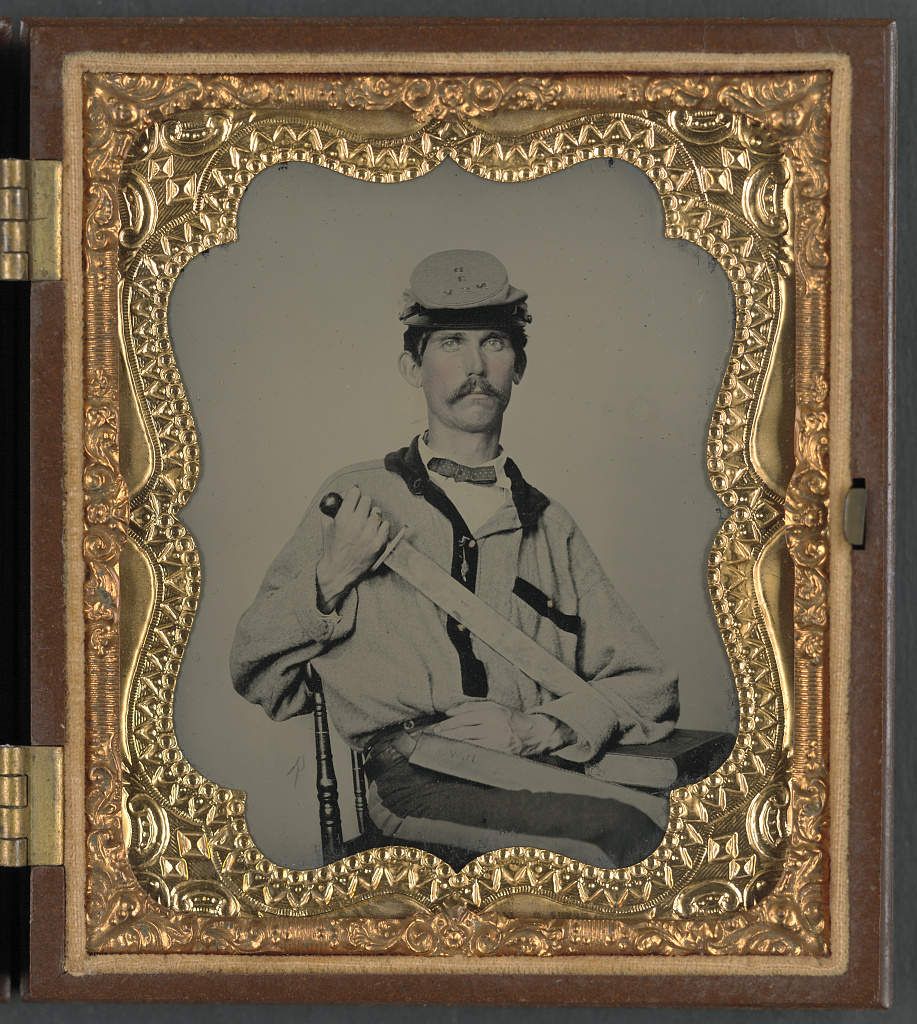
Soldier in Confederate uniform and Co. D, 3rd North Carolina Volunteers Regiment hat with short sword and sheath with initials J.L.W., probably for Private John L. Wood of Co. D, 3rd North Carolina Infantry Regiment

The 3rd North Carolina Infantry Regiment was a regiment of the Confederate States Army, formed shortly after the commencement of the American Civil War in May 1861.

== Formation ==
The unit completed its organization at Garysburg, North Carolina, in May, 1861. The men were volunteers from Wilmington and the counties of Green, Duplin, Cumberland, Onslow, Bladen, New Hanover, and Beaufort. In July part of the regiment moved to Richmond, Virginia, where some weeks later it was joined by the remaining companies.

== Combat experience ==
The regiment fought in many battles during the Civil War. At the Battle of Gettysburg the unit suffered terrible casualties, losing forty percent of the 548 men engaged. In April 1865 it surrendered, with just 4 officers and 53 men remaining.

== See also ==
- List of North Carolina Confederate Civil War units
