= Fluvanna Artillery =

- Flag of Virginia
- Active: May/June, 1861 to April, 1865
- Country: Confederate States of America
- Allegiance: Confederate
- Branch: Army
- Type: Artillery
- Nickname: "Sons of Fluvanna"
- Stars and Bars

The Fluvanna Artillery was an artillery battery formed from citizens of Fluvanna County, Virginia, during the American Civil War. It participated in the Antietam and Gettysburg campaigns, as well as the Shenandoah Valley Campaigns of 1864 under Confederate Major General Jubal Early. The Fluvanna Artillery began as two separate batteries raised in 1861.

With the outbreak of hostilities following the Battle of Fort Sumter, Governor John Letcher ordered that units be raised from around Virginia and sent to Richmond in order to defend the Commonwealth. Fluvanna County was quick to respond to the governor's calls and organized an artillery battery, the "Sons of Fluvanna," also known as the 1st Fluvanna Battery, on May 20, 1861, under the command of Capt. Charles Huckstep. With no guns or horses due to local shortages, the battery trained locally until it was ordered to report to Richmond on June 18. It boarded boats on the James River and Kanawha Canal for the trip to Richmond, whereupon arrival, the men were sent to Richmond College for more training and drill. There, the battery finally received its cannons, equipage, and horses.

The 2nd Fluvanna Artillery was organized in June 1861, by Cary Cocke, the former colonel of the 12th Virginia Militia. The battery was raised in the southeastern portion of the county and used the grounds around the Fluvanna Baptist Church to drill, while the local ladies made the uniforms at the church. They were enlisted for service on August 6, 1861, at the church, and left to be equipped in Richmond.

On September 3, cheered by local women as they departed, the Sons of Fluvanna (designated as the 1st Fluvanna Artillery) moved from Richmond to join the main Confederate Army stationed at Manassas. Both the 1st and 2nd Fluvanna Artillery were assigned to the same battalion, and served in the 1862 Peninsula Campaign, but were held in reserve at the Second Battle of Manassas and at Sharpsburg. The battery lost a gun and a caisson at the Battle of Shepherdstown covering Robert E. Lee's retreat. In October, the two batteries were consolidated to create the Fluvanna Artillery. The Battery was held in reserves from Fredericksburg to Gettysburg and saw some action in the fall of 1863. The battery saw considerable action during the 1864 Overland Campaign under Capt. John L. Massie, serving from the Wilderness to Cold Harbor.

Transferred as part of Jubal Early's command to the Army of the Valley, the battery participated in Early's raid on Washington, fighting in numerous engagements, including Monocacy and Cedar Creek. Captain Massie was mortally wounded in September 1864, and Capt. Charles G. Snead led the remaining artillerymen for the balance of the war. The battery was then temporarily disbanded around Christmas, 1864, to conserve supplies. Those who stayed behind were captured at the Battle of Waynesboro, Virginia on March 2, 1865. After capture, they were marched to Stephensons Depot. They were then loaded onto box cars and shipped north to Baltimore, Maryland. Their final destination was Fort Delaware Prison. Members were paroled and released between June 21 and 22, 1865.

The Battery still continued service till the end of the war. Many were at home at the time of the battle at Waynesboro, and some may have participated in the skirmish between the Fluvanna Home Guard and Federal cavalry at Palmyra on March 10, 1865. On April 5, Captain Snead received orders to report to the Army of Northern Virginia, and the remainder of the Fluvanna Artillery marched out to join them. But before they could join the army, Lee surrendered at Appomattox Court House. The battery returned home and many received paroles at Columbia, Virginia, in May, 1865.

== Commanders ==
- Captain Charles Huckstep (1st Battery)
- Captain William Holman (1st Battery)
- Captain Cary Cocke (2nd Battery)
- Captain John J. Ancell (2nd Battery)
- Captain John L. Massie (consolidated battery)
- Captain Charles G. Snead (consolidated battery)
- Captain John Pittman (consolidate battery)
- Captain Colin E. Phillips (3rd battery)
- Captain Noah Cruz (3rd battery)

== See also ==
- List of Virginia Civil War units
