= 5th Florida Infantry Regiment =

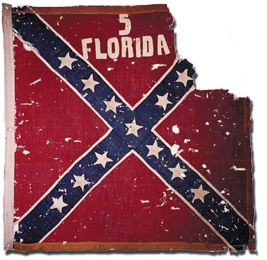
- Active: 1862 – April 9, 1865
- Country: Confederate States of America
- Allegiance: Confederate Florida; Confederate States of America
- Branch: Confederate States Army
- Type: Regiment
- Role: Infantry
- Part of: Army of Northern Virginia
- Engagements: American Civil War

The 5th Florida Infantry Regiment served in E.A. Perry's Florida Brigade alongside the 2nd and 8th Florida. Perry's Brigade served under Anderson’s Division of Longstreet’s First Corps, of the Army of Northern Virginia.

The regiment was organized in Tallahassee during the spring 1862. Companies in the unit were raised from the counties of Santa Rosa, Baker, Polk, Calhoun, Okaloosa, Wakulla, Madison, and Liberty.

They fought in the Battles of Second Manassas, Sharpsburg, and Antietam from August–September 1862. Colonel David Lang took command of the Florida Brigade and led them at Fredericksburg in December 1862 and Chancellorsville in May 1863. Under Col. Lang's command the Florida Brigade fought at Gettysburg in July 1863. They were attached to Picket's Division, and took part in the famous attack on the Union center on the third day. The 5th Florida were the only unit in the brigade to not lose their regimental banner in the battle.

After the Battles of the Wilderness and Spotsylvania in 1864, the Brigade was joined by the victors of the Battle of Olustee, the 9th, 10th, and 11th Regiments. General Joseph Finegan, the famous commander of Florida forces at Olustee, took command of the Florida Brigade, then known as “Finegan’s Brigade”.

In the last year of war the Florida Brigade fought at Cold Harbor in June 1864 and Petersburg during the winter. The Florida Brigade retreated with the Army of Northern Virginia and surrendered at Appomattox Courthouse on April 9, 1865. By the time of surrender, the regiments were the size of modern-day platoons or companies. The 2nd, 5th, and 8th surrendered 68, 53, and 32 men respectively. The 9th, 10th, and 11th surrendered 124, 162, and 23. Most of the 11th had been cut off in the Army’s retreat and had previously surrendered.

== Engagements and Battles ==
1862

- Second Battle of Bull Run
- Battle of Antietam

1863

- Battle of Chancellorsville
- Battle of Gettysburg

1864-1865

- Battle of the Wilderness
- Battle of Spotsylvania
- Battle of Cold Harbor
- Siege of Petersburg

== See also ==
- List of Florida Civil War Confederate Units
- Florida National Guard
- 53rd Infantry Brigade Combat Team (United States)
- 124th Infantry Regiment (United States)
