= 16th Virginia Infantry Regiment =

- Flag of Virginia, 1861
- Active: May 1861 – April 1865
- Allegiance: Confederate States of America
- Branch: Confederate States Army
- Type: Infantry
- Engagements: American Civil War: First Battle of Manassas; Seven Days' Battles; Second Battle of Manassas; Battle of Sharpsburg; Battle of Fredericksburg; Battle of Chancellorsville; Battle of Gettysburg; Battle of Cold Harbor; Siege of Petersburg

Commanders
- Notable commanders: Colonel Raleigh E. Colston; Colonel Stapleton Crutchfield

The 16th Virginia Infantry Regiment was an infantry regiment raised in 1861 in Portsmouth in southeastern Virginia for service in the Confederate States Army during the American Civil War. The regiment fought almost exclusively with the Confederate Army of Northern Virginia.

The 16th Virginia completed its organization in May 1861 with ten companies. However, because of various reorganizations and transfers, the unit contained only seven companies after 1 November 1862. The men were from Suffolk and Portsmouth, and the counties of Nansemond, Princess Anne, Isle of Wight, Sussex, and Chesterfield.

The regiment initially served in the Department of Norfolk, and in June 1862 had 516 effectives. Assigned to General John Weisiger's Brigade, General William Mahone's Division, and eventually General A.P. Hill's Third Corps of General Robert E. Lee's Army of Northern Virginia, it fought in many conflicts: from the Seven Days' Battles to Cold Harbor. Later in the War, it was involved in the Siege of Petersburg (south of the James River) and in the Appomattox Campaign.

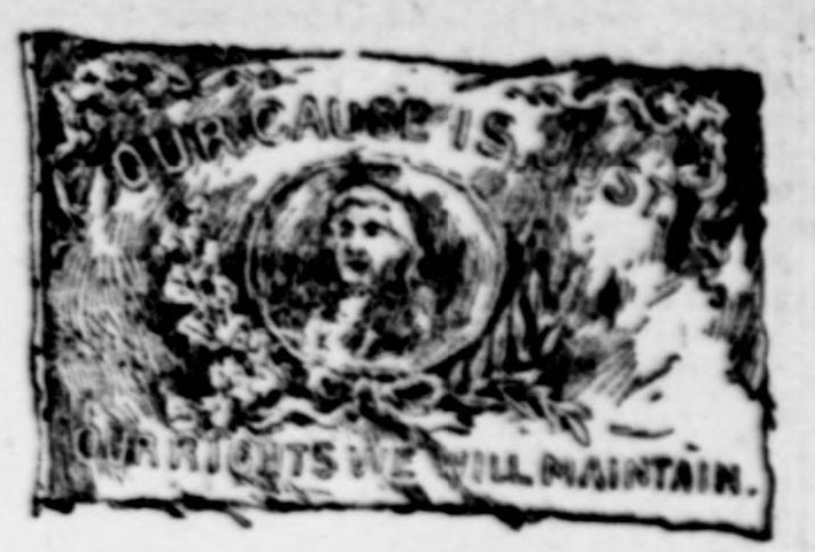
Flag of Company H

The regiment reported 91 casualties at Malvern Hill, 154 at Second Manassas, 5 in the Maryland Campaign, and 18 at Chancellorsville. Of the 270 engaged at Gettysburg, about five percent were disabled. The regiment eventually surrendered with 10 officers and 114 men.

The field officers were Colonels Raleigh E. Colston, Charles A. Crump, Stapleton Crutchfield, Joseph H. Ham, and Henry T. Parrish; Lieutenant Colonels John C. Page and Richard O. Whitehead; and Majors Francis D. Holladay, Francis M. Ironmonger, and John T. Woodhouse.

== See also ==
- List of Virginia Civil War units
