= 52nd Virginia Infantry Regiment =

- Flag of Virginia, 1861
- Active: June 1861 – April 1865
- Disbanded: April 1865
- Country: Confederacy
- Allegiance: Confederate States of America
- Branch: Confederate States Army
- Type: Infantry
- Engagements: American Civil War: Battle of Greenbrier River; Battle of Camp Allegheny; Jackson's Valley Campaign; Seven Days' Battles; Second Battle of Bull Run; Battle of Antietam; Battle of Fredericksburg; Battle of Chancellorsville; Battle of Gettysburg; Battle of Cold Harbor; Valley Campaigns of 1864; Appomattox Campaign

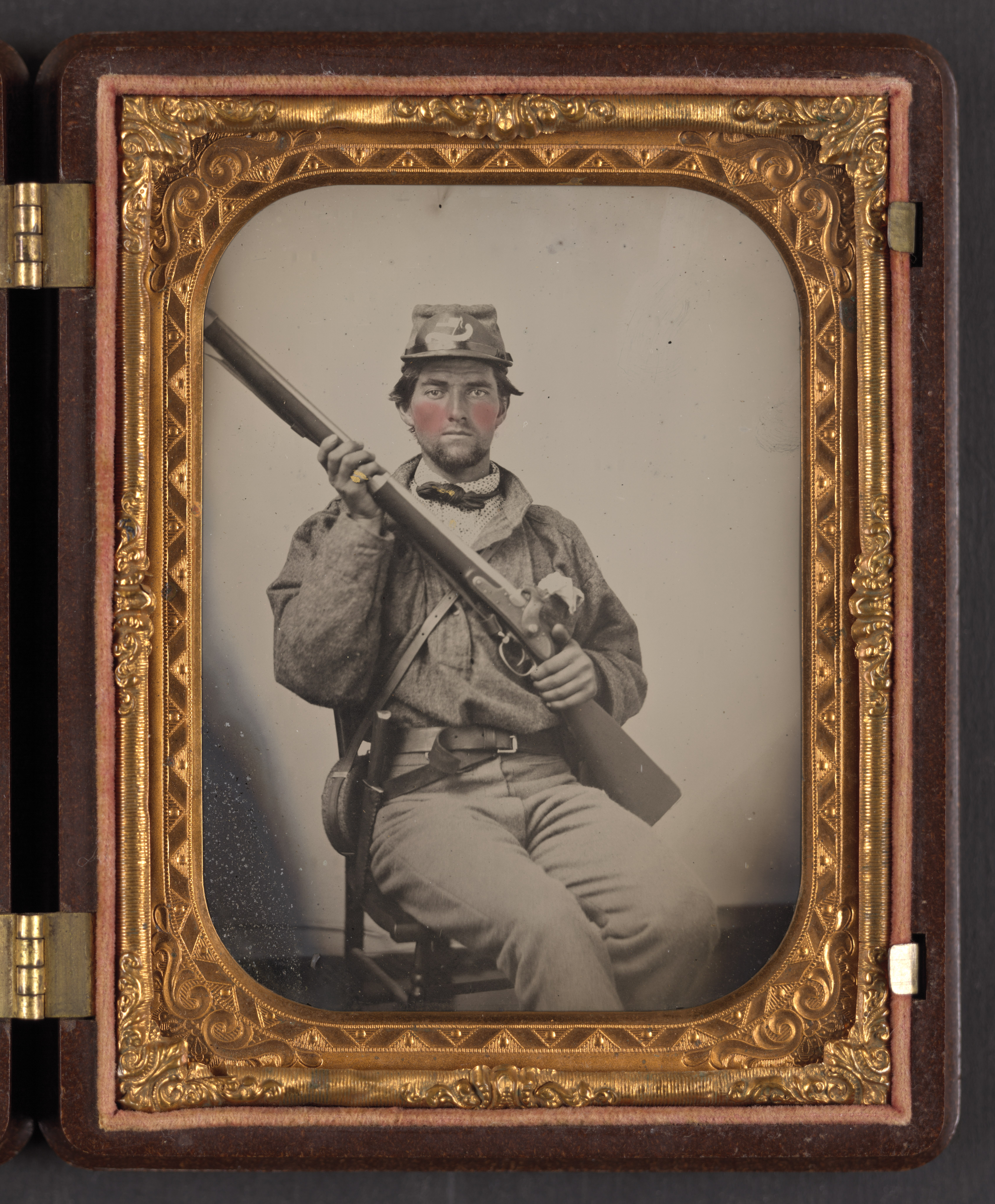
Private George Hamilton Guinn of Co. A, 52nd Virginia Infantry Regiment

The 52nd Virginia Infantry Regiment was an infantry regiment raised in Virginia for service in the Confederate States Army during the American Civil War. It fought mostly with the Army of Northern Virginia.

The 52nd Virginia was organized at Staunton, Virginia, in August 1861. Many of its members were from Augusta County. It fought at Greenbrier River and Camp Alleghany, and later in Jackson's Valley Campaign. The unit was then assigned to Early's, W. Smith's, Pegram's, and J.A. Walker's Brigade in the Army of Northern Virginia. It participated in various conflicts from the Seven Days' Battles to Cold Harbor, marched with Early to the Shenandoah Valley, and was active around Appomattox.

This regiment lost 2 wounded and 6 missing at Camp Alleghany, had 7 killed and 46 wounded at McDowell, and suffered 14 killed and 87 wounded at Cross Keys and Port Republic. It reported 29 casualties at Gaines' Mill, 61 at Second Manassas, 13 at Fredericksburg, and 12 at Chancellorsville. Of the 254 engaged at Gettysburg, six percent were disabled. On April 9, 1865, it surrendered with 7 officers and 53 men of which 14 were armed.

The field officers were Colonels John B. Baldwin, Michael G. Harman, John D. Lilley, John D.H. Ross, and Thomas H. Watkins.

== See also ==
- List of Virginia Civil War units
