= Frank Huger =

Francis Kinloch Huger
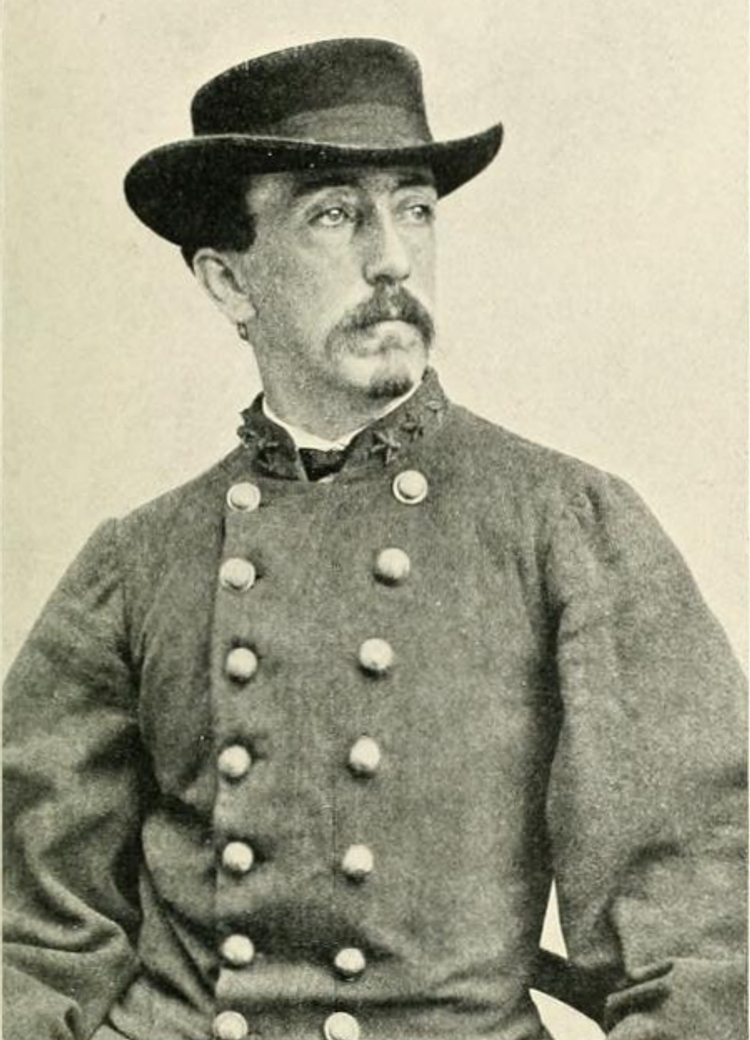
- Frank Huger
- Born: September 29, 1837; Norfolk, Virginia
- Died: June 10, 1897 (aged 59); Roanoke, Virginia
- Relatives: father Benjamin Huger
- Military career
- Allegiance: United States of America; Confederate States of America
- Branch: United States Army; Confederate States Army
- Service years: 1860–1861 (USA); 1861–1865 (CSA)
- Rank: Second Lieutenant (USA); Colonel (CSA)
- Unit: 10th U.S. Infantry
- Commands: Norfolk Light Artillery Battery; Huger's Artillery Battalion; Artillery, First Corps
- Conflicts: American Civil War: Seven Days Battles; Second Battle of Bull Run; Battle of Fredericksburg; Battle of Salem Church; Battle of Chancellorsville; Battle of Gettysburg; Knoxville Campaign; Overland Campaign; Siege of Petersburg; Battle of the Crater; Battle of Sailors' Creek
- Other work: Railroad executive

Francis Huger (1837–1897), a son of Gen Benjamin Huger, served as a Confederate artilleryman in the American Civil War.

== Pre-war ==
Francis (Frank) Kinloch Huger, a son of Benjamin Huger and Elizabeth Celestine Pinckney, was born in Norfolk, Virginia in 1837. Like his father, Huger attended the United States Military Academy at West Point. He graduated from west Point in 1860 and was assigned to the 10th U.S. Infantry as a second lieutenant. Huger resigned his commission on May 21, 1861 to join the Confederate cause.

== Civil War service ==
Frank Huger entered the Confederate service, as did his father. Commissioned a captain, Huger led the Norfolk Light Artillery. The battery was attached to the brigade of Brig. Gen. Ambrose R. Wright in the elder Huger’s division in the Seven Days Battles. At the Second Battle of Bull Run and the Battle of Fredericksburg his battery was attached to the division of Maj. Gen. Richard H. Anderson. He was absent from the Battle of Antietam, when it was led by Lt. C. R. Phelps. Huger’s guns were involved, together with the brigade of Brig. Gen. Cadmus Wilcox, in the Battle of Salem Church.

Huger was promoted to major on March 2, 1863. At first, he was second in command of a battalion of artillery led by Col. Edward Porter Alexander. Alexander welcomed Huger, describing him later as "my glorious & beloved Frank Huger, who never shirked a care or danger or grumbled over a hardship in his life..." In that capacity, Huger served in the Battle of Chancellorsville, including bombarding federal lines from high ground at Hazel Grove on May 3, 1863. Huger was sent on May 4 to support the division of Maj. Gen. Richard H. Anderson in the Battle of Salem Church. His guns were among those that fired the last shots of the battle the next day, as the Union VI Corps retreated across the Rappahannock River. At the Battle of Gettysburg, Huger was involved in supporting the attack of Lt. Gen. James Longstreet's corps on the federal left on July 2. During July 3 Huger took immediate command of the guns as Alexander was assigned responsibility for the bombardment preceding Pickett's Charge.

Huger went West with Longstreet's Corps, but he arrived too late for the Battle of Chickamauga. When Longstreet moved into eastern Tennessee to evict federal forces, Alexander served as his chief of artillery. Huger consequently commanded Alexander’s battalion in the Knoxville Campaign. When Alexander became the permanent chief of corps artillery in late 1863, Huger officially took over command of the battalion. He rose to the rank of lieutenant colonel shortly thereafter, being promoted on February 27, 1864.

Huger's battalion served in the Overland Campaign and the Siege of Petersburg. In Alexander’s absence, he was temporarily in charge of the artillery of the First Corps posted near Elliott's Salient at the time of the Battle of the Crater. At the height of the Union attack on July 30, 1864, following the explosion of the mine under the Salient, Huger was seen helping work a gun along with members of Alexander's staff. Huger was promoted to the rank of colonel on February 18, 1865. He was captured during the Battle of Sailors' Creek by Union cavalry led by Brig. Gen. George A. Custer, a fellow West Point graduate (Class of 1861). Huger was treated by Custer more like a guest than a prisoner.

== Post war ==
After the war, Frank Huger became involved in railroads. He died in 1897.
