= Florida Brigade of the Army of Northern Virginia =

American Civil War military unit

The Florida Brigade, also known as The Flowers or Perry's Brigade, was a unit that fought for the Confederacy during the American Civil War. The brigade was initially composed of three regiments raised out of the state of Florida: the 2nd, 5th, and 8th Florida Infantry. Over time, the brigade would be reinforced and replenished with other units raised from Florida. The brigade was first led by Edward A. Perry. It fought as part of Lee's Army of Northern Virginia.

== Service history ==
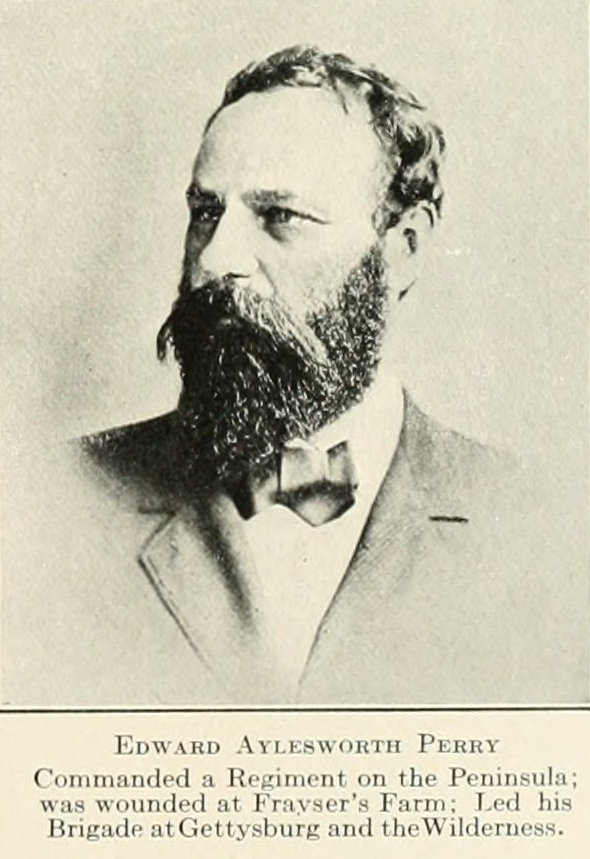
Brigadier General Edward A. Perry. Note that the caption erroneously states that Perry led the brigade at Gettysburg. Instead, it was David Lang who led the Brigade.

The first unit in the brigade to see combat was the 2nd Florida Regiment at a skirmish near Yorktown in early May 1862 as part of the Siege of Yorktown.

In August 1862, reinforcements from Florida arrived in Virginia. During the Second Battle of Bull Run, the newly arrived 5th Florida Infantry Regiment and 8th Florida Infantry Regiment fought alongside the 2nd Florida as part of Pryor's Brigade. During the Battle of Antietam, Pryor's Brigade, still including the Florida regiments, helped relieve D.H. Hill who was being successfully engaged by Union troops at the Sunken Lane.

In November 1862, the three Florida regiments (the 2nd, 5th, and 8th) were split off from Pryor's brigade and reorganized as the Florida Brigade. Its first brigadier general was Edward A. Perry. Perry led the men at Fredericksburg and Chancellorsville but missed Gettysburg due to having typhoid fever.

Because of Perry's illness, David Lang, Colonel of the 8th Florida, was put in command of the brigade on July 1, 1863 when the leading units of the Army of Northern Virginia engaged with the advanced units from the Union's Army of the Potomac outside the town of Gettysburg. The Florida Brigade was part of Anderson's Division which, in turn, was part of A. P. Hill's Third Corps. Thanks to the Florida Brigade's position towards the rear of the Third Corps, it did not see any fighting on the first day of the battle. On the second day, the Floridians fought at Cemetery Ridge, where the unit managed to capture several Federal cannons. On the third day, the Florida Brigade was a part of Pickett's Charge. At the start of the battle, the brigade had 742 men. By the end, the unit suffered 461 casualties, or 62% of its strength.

Toward the end of May 1864, into the next couple months, the Army of Northern Virginia received reinforcements, including several units from Florida. These included what would eventually be designated as the 9th, 10th, and 11th Florida infantry, all of which were added to the Florida Brigade.

An analysis of the desertion rates amongst the Floridians in Lee's army reveals that it depended on the individual unit. For example, amongst the newer recruits from the 9th, 10th, and 11th regiments, roughly 1/3 of the men deserted. Several companies from these regiments were composed of conscripts, or overaged, or underaged soldiers. Alternatively, amongst those veteran men from the Perry's original brigade (the 2nd, 5th, and 8th regiments) less than 1/5 deserted.

== Engagements and battles ==
=== 1862 ===
- Battle of 2nd Bull Run, August 28–30, 1862.
- Battle of Antietam, September 17, 1862.
- Battle of Fredericksburg, December 13, 1862.

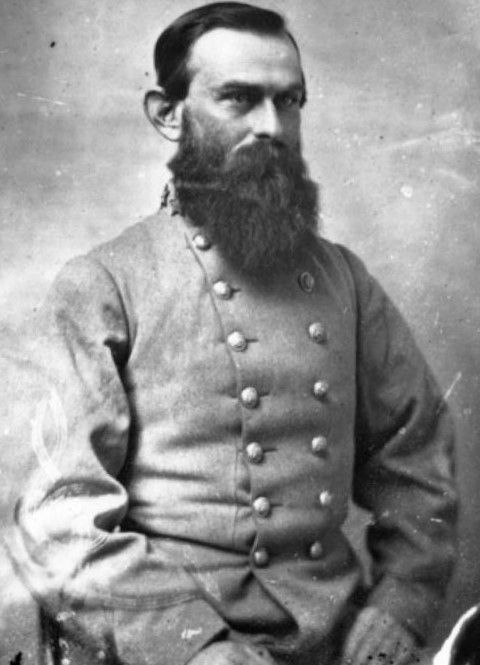
David Lang was the colonel of the 8th Florida Infantry Regiment. When Brig. Gen. Perry was stricken with Typhoid Fever, Lang took command of the brigade during the Battle of Gettysburg.

=== 1863 ===
- Battle of Chancellorsville, May 1–4, 1863.
- Battle of Gettysburg, July 1–3, 1863.
- Bristoe Campaign, October 1863.
- Mine Run Campaign, November—December. 1863.

=== 1864-1865 ===
- The Wilderness, May 5–6, 1864.
- Battle of Spotsylvania Court House, May 8—21, 1864.
- Battle of North Anna, May 22–26, 1864.
- Battle of Cold Harbor, June 1–3, 1864.
- Petersburg Siege, June 1864—April 1865.
- Weldon Railroad, June 23, 1864.
- Ream's Station, June 30, 1864.
- Battle of Globe Tavern, August 21, 1864.
- Battle of Belfield, December 9, 1864.
- Battle of Hatcher's Run, February 5–7, 1865. Farmville, April 7, 1865.
- Appomattox Court House, April 9, 1865.

== Legacy ==
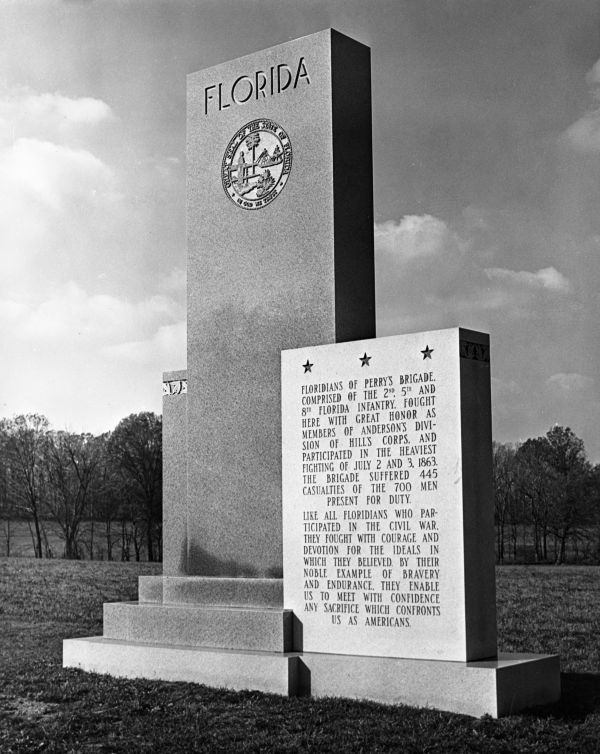
Monument to Florida Brigade at the Gettysburg battlefield - Gettysburg, Pennsylvania.

On July 3, 1963, during the 100th anniversary of the Battle of Gettysburg, a monument commemorating the Florida Confederate soldiers who fought at Gettysburg was dedicated at the Gettysburg National Military Park.

== See also ==
- Florida in the American Civil War
- List of Florida Confederate Civil War units
