= Edward A. Perry =

14th Governor of Florida

Edward Aylesworth Perry
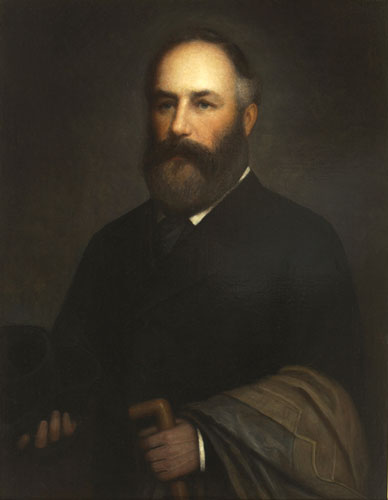

14th Governor of Florida
- In office January 7, 1885 – January 8, 1889
- Lieutenant: Milton H. Mabry
- Preceded by: William D. Bloxham
- Succeeded by: Francis P. Fleming

Judge of the Escambia County Court
- In office 1857–1861

Personal details
- Born: March 15, 1831 Richmond, Massachusetts, US
- Died: October 15, 1889 (aged 58) Kerrville, Texas, US
- Party: Democratic
- Spouse: Wathen Virginia Taylor Perry

Military service
- Allegiance: Confederate States of America
- Branch/service: Confederate States Army
- Years of service: 1861–65
- Rank: Brigadier-General
- Commands: Perry's Florida Brigade
- Campaigns: American Civil War: Peninsula Campaign; Battle of Chancellorsville; Bristoe Campaign; Battle of the Wilderness; Siege of Petersburg

Edward Aylesworth Perry (March 15, 1831 – October 15, 1889) was a Confederate general who was primarily known for serving under Robert E. Lee during the American Civil War and also later became the 14th Governor of Florida.

== Early life ==
He was a descendant of Arthur Perry, one of the earliest settlers of New England. His parents were farmers, Asa and Philura Perry, and he was the fourth of five children.

Born in Richmond, Massachusetts, Perry briefly attended Yale University before moving to Greenville, Alabama in 1853. In Alabama, he taught and studied law with Hilary Herbert, who later served as a colonel in the Confederate States Army, a U.S. congressman from Alabama, and Secretary of the Navy under President Grover Cleveland. Perry soon moved to Pensacola, Florida, and passed the bar exam. He served as a judge for Escambia County, Florida, from 1857 through 1861. He married Wathen Virginia Taylor of Greenville, Alabama, on February 1, 1859, the daughter of Hubbard Bonner Taylor and Marjorie Catherine Herbert Taylor, and a granddaughter of Dr. Hilary Herbert, one of the earliest settlers of Butler County, Alabama. Mrs. Perry was also a cousin of the Hilary A. Herbert, with whom he studied law in Alabama.

== American Civil War ==
During the Civil War, Perry fought with distinction for the Confederacy, rising from the rank of private to brigadier general. In May 1861, he enlisted in the "Pensacola Rifle Rangers", which was later designated Company A of the 2nd Florida Infantry, and was elected as its captain. A year later, he was elected colonel of the regiment.

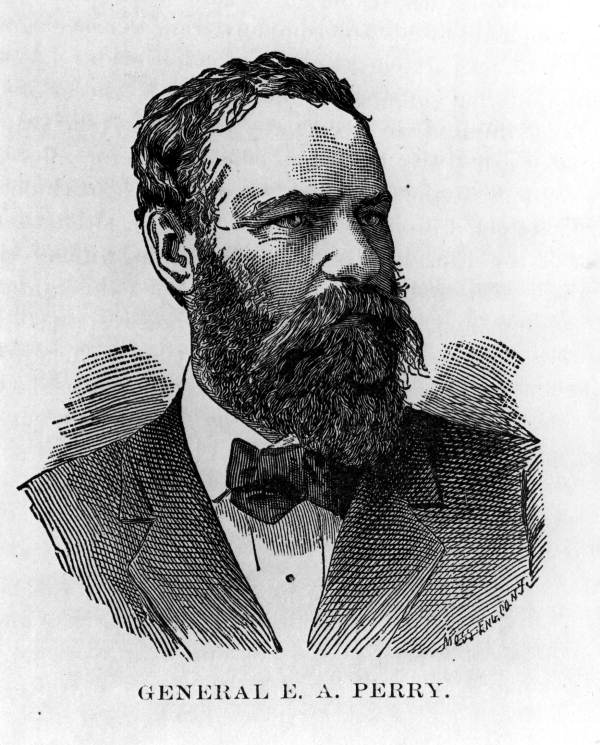
General E.A. Perry

In June 1862, he was wounded during the fight at Glendale during the Peninsula Campaign and furloughed. On August 28, 1862, Perry was appointed as a brigadier general in the Provisional Army of the Confederacy and returned to active duty the following year. He led an all-Florida brigade in the Army of Northern Virginia at the Battle of Chancellorsville, but was stricken with typhoid fever and missed the Gettysburg campaign, where Col. David Lang commanded Perry's Brigade.

Perry returned to the Army of Northern Virginia to command his brigade for the Bristoe Campaign in the fall of 1863. He was severely wounded in the fighting at the Wilderness on May 6, 1864. He briefly returned to the trenches during the Siege of Petersburg, but had not recovered sufficiently for active duty. Hence, he was sent to Alabama for the duration of the war, serving on reserve duty in the Confederate Invalid Corps.

== Aftermath; Governor ==
He returned to Florida and became a prominent lawyer and Democratic state politician. Elected governor in 1884, he assumed office on January 7, 1885. During his administration, Florida adopted a new constitution and established the state board of education. He was an outspoken opponent of "carpetbaggers".

Perry was active in the Scottish Rite of Freemasonry. His antebellum home became the Scottish Rite Temple in downtown Pensacola.

The Confederate Monument on Palafox Street bears a plaque honoring his wife, Wathen Virginia Taylor Perry, who raised the funds for its erection. After leaving office on January 8, 1889, he returned home to Pensacola. In later years, the property was sold for $2.53 million to the adjacent First United Methodist Church, and fund raising for renovations are in place.

He died suddenly of a stroke while visiting Kerrville, Texas, in 1889, aged 58. He and his wife are buried in St. John's Cemetery in Pensacola, Florida.

== See also ==
- List of American Civil War generals (Confederate)

== Notes ==
Party political offices
Preceded by William D. Bloxham	Democratic nominee for Governor of Florida; 1884	Succeeded by Francis P. Fleming
Political offices
Preceded by William D. Bloxham	Governor of Florida; January 7, 1885 – January 8, 1889	Succeeded by Francis P. Fleming
