= A. Page Brown =

American architect (1859–1896)

- Born: Arthur Page Brown; 19 October 1859; Ellisburg, New York, U.S.
- Died: 21 January 1896 (aged 36); Burlingame, California, U.S.
- Education: Cornell University
- Occupation: Architect

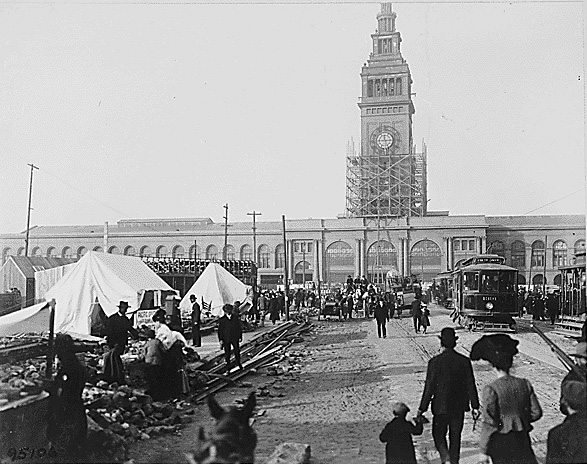
San Francisco Ferry Building, designed by A. Page Brown in 1892.

A. Page Brown, born Arthur Page Brown (December 1859 – January 21, 1896), was an American architect known for buildings that incorporated classical styles in the Beaux-Arts manner. Having first worked in the office of McKim, Mead and White in New York City in 1879, he established his own firm in 1884 and hired a young Willis Polk as a draftsman. In 1889 Brown moved his office to San Francisco, California to take advantage of the city's growth.

Brown is best known for designing the San Francisco Ferry Building, which opened in 1898, and at the time was the largest project ever undertaken in San Francisco. He is credited with introducing the Mission Revival style to Santa Barbara, with his designs for residences along Garden Street. The style was widely adopted in Santa Barbara and has shaped its visual identity.

== Early life and education ==
Arthur Page Brown was born in Ellisburg, New York, in Jefferson County; he was descended from Yankees from New England. His formal education in architecture consisted of a year at the Cornell University School of Architecture, but he left in 1879 to join the newly established architectural firm of McKim, Mead and White. From 1883 to 1884 he traveled extensively through Europe, where he was influenced by Beaux-Arts architecture, based on Neoclassical and Renaissance styles.

== Marriage and family ==
He married Lucy Pryor on February 25, 1886, at the Church of the Transfiguration in Manhattan, also known as "The Little Church Around the Corner."; she was the daughter of Sara Agnes Rice and Roger Atkinson Pryor. Lucy and her six Pryor siblings were all born in Petersburg, Virginia; her father was a general in the Confederate Army during the American Civil War. Their family moved to New York City in the late 1860s to recover from postwar poverty. Roger A. Pryor became a successful attorney, active in Democratic Party politics, and later was appointed as justice to the New York State Supreme Court. Sara Agnes Rice Pryor founded several heritage organizations and was active in civic affairs. She also had several books, including novels, histories and memoirs, published by the Macmillan Company in the early 1900s. Her memoirs were the basis of joint biography of her and her husband by John C. Waugh, which was published in 2002.

The Browns had three children together.

== Career ==
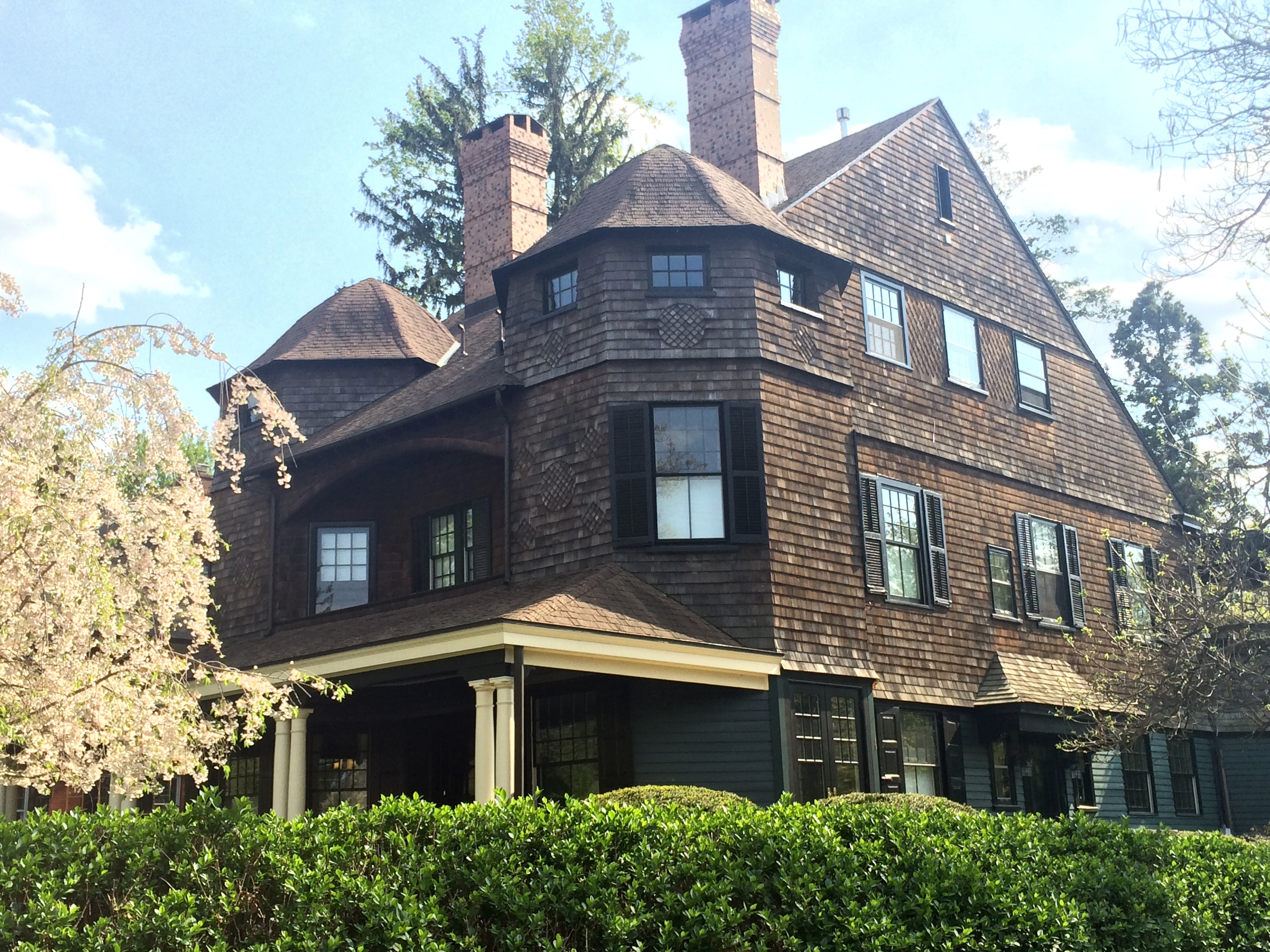
One of Brown's earlier works, the William Berryman Scott House at 56 Bayard Lane, Princeton, New Jersey, in the Princeton Historic District (1888)

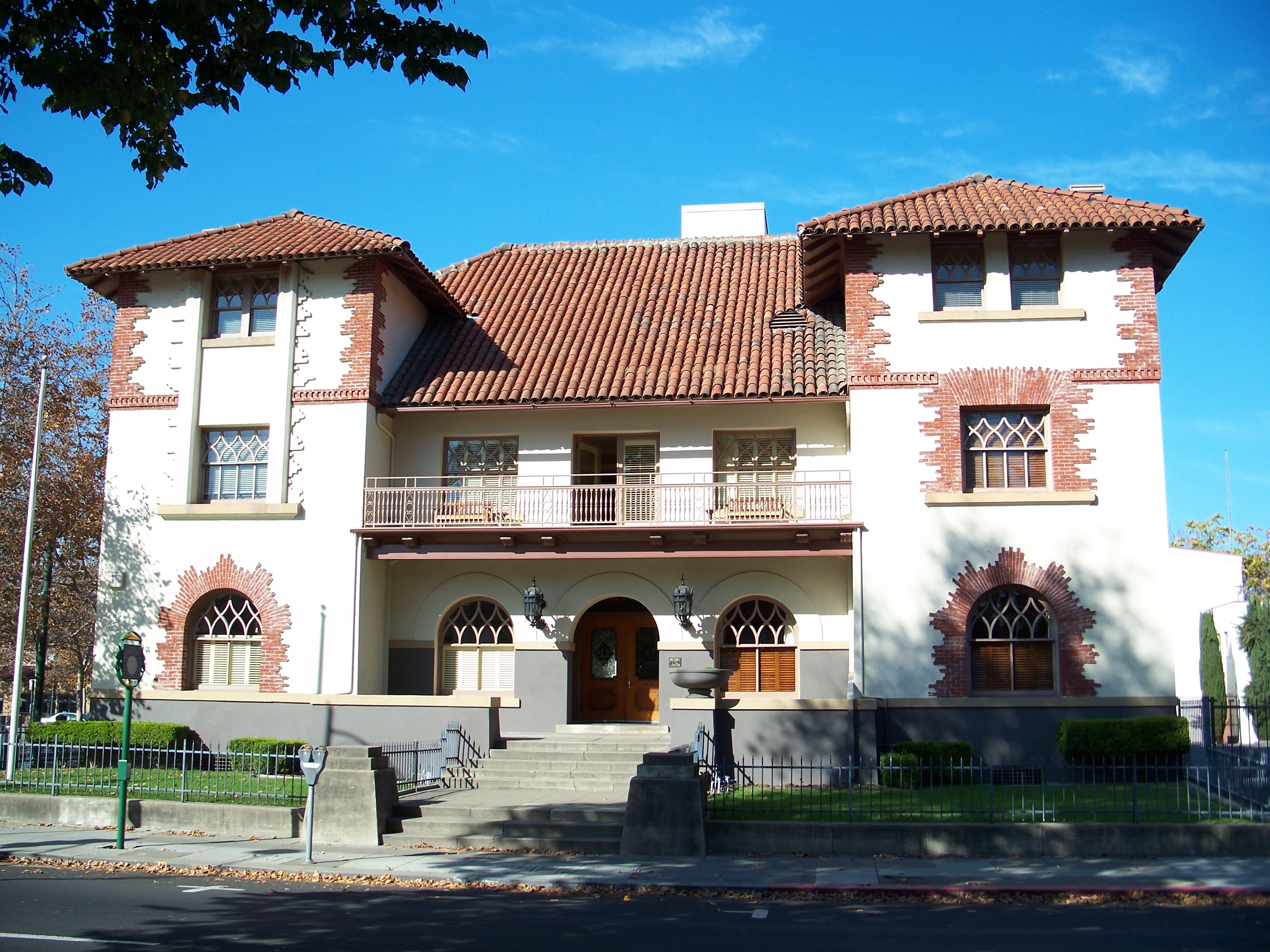
One of Brown's works, the Sainte Claire Club (1893) in San Jose, California

In New York, Brown joined the office of McKim, Mead & White in 1879; he left for a brief period, returning in 1882. After an extensive tour of Europe (1883–1884), Brown rejoined the firm in 1884. At that point, he started doing some additional work for Nancy Fowler McCormick, a Chicago philanthropist. Under her patronage, he opened his own office in December 1884, under the name A. Page Brown, and hired the young Willis Polk as a draftsman.

In 1889 Brown was commissioned by Mary Ann Deming Crocker to design a mausoleum for her late husband, the wealthy California industrialist, Charles Crocker. The massive granite structure is located on "Millionaire's Row" at Mountain View Cemetery in Oakland, California. Mrs. Crocker also commissioned him to design the Crocker Old People's Home in San Francisco.

These opportunities allowed Brown to move his office to San Francisco where the city's rapid development would offer greater opportunities. He persuaded Willis Polk to go with him to San Francisco, California, and the two were among a number of talented architects who moved from the East Coast at the end of the 19th century and established firms in San Francisco.

With his newly established office, his highly regarded upper-class social contacts, a developed East Coast portfolio, and a talented staff that included not only Willis Polk, but Bernard Maybeck and A. C. Schweinfurth, Brown was the favored architect of San Francisco society. His reputation for bringing the most contemporary design aesthetic from the East Coast created the perception that he led the "reorientation of San Francisco architecture from the Victorian to the academic sphere," popularizing the Beaux-Arts style.

In 1892 Brown designed the San Francisco Ferry Building, a ferry terminal for both commuters and travelers who visited San Francisco. When completed in 1898, the Ferry Building was the largest single project undertaken in the city up to that time. Located on the Embarcadero at the foot of Market Street, it was a prominent structure intended to be a symbol of the city, and its 245-foot clock tower, which Brown designed after the 12th-century Giralda bell tower in Seville, Spain, could be seen across the city and the bay. Prior to the 1930s (when both the Golden Gate and Bay bridges were completed), the Ferry Building was the second busiest transportation terminal in the world, seeing an average of 50,000 commuters a day.

In 1894, Brown introduced the Mission Revival style to Santa Barbara, where it became popular for a variety of building types, shaping the visual identity of the city to this day.

Brown, Polk, Maybeck, and Schweinfurth were also associated with the First Bay Tradition, which they helped popularize along with other architects.

In 1896, Brown died at his home in Burlingame, California of severe injuries suffered in a runaway horse and buggy accident. At the time of his death, the Ferry Building was still under construction; it was opened in 1898.
