= William de Leftwich Dodge =

American artist (1867–1935)

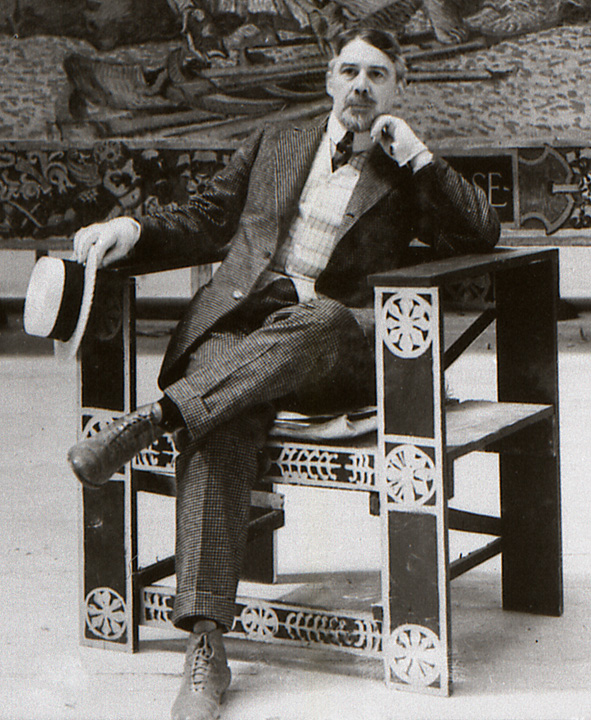
- Dodge in 1915
- Born: March 8, 1867; Bedford, Virginia, US
- Died: March 25, 1935 (aged 68); New York City, US
- Occupations: muralist, portraitist, illustrator
- Known for: monumental murals
- Spouse: Francesca Theodora Bland Pryor (m. 1897)
- Children: Roger, Sara

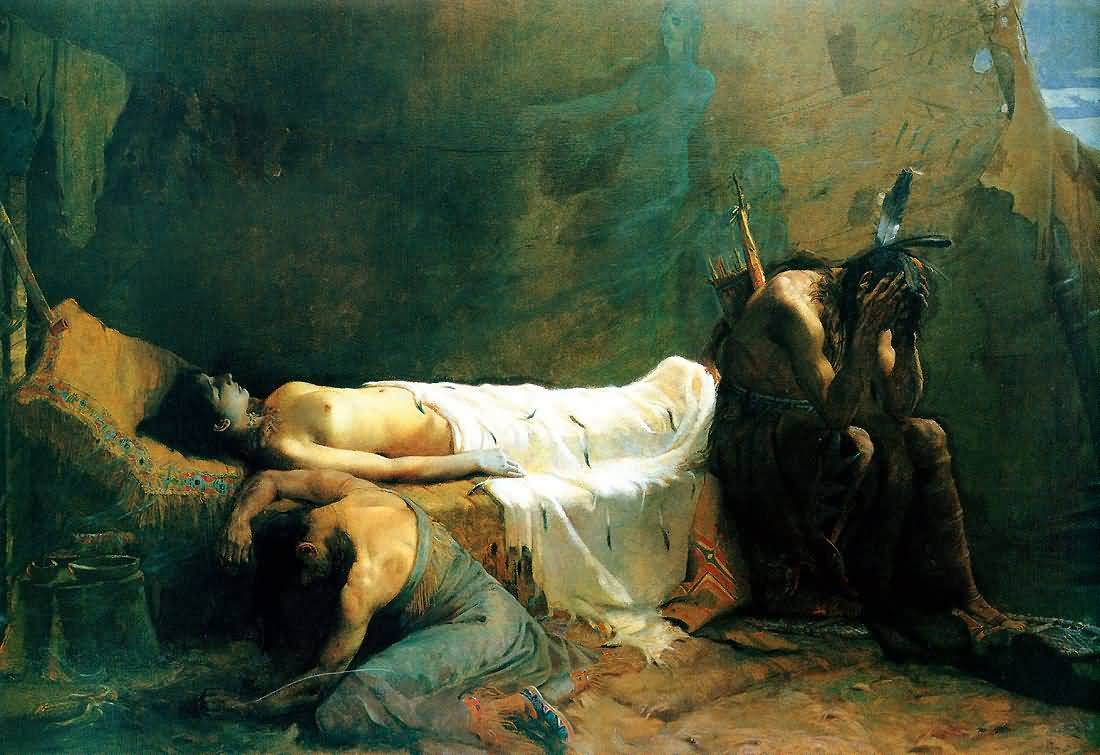
"The Death of Minnehaha" by William de Leftwich Dodge, 1887

William de Leftwich Dodge (March 8, 1867 – March 25, 1935) was an American artist best known for his murals, which were commissioned for both public and private buildings.

== Early life and education ==
Dodge was born at Liberty, Virginia, in the Piedmont near Lynchburg. In 1879, his mother, Mary de Leftwich Dodge, an aspiring artist, moved her family to Europe. After living initially in Munich they moved to Paris, where she worked on art. Dodge later followed her example and became an artist. He spent most of his childhood years in France, where his mother was working on art. He studied at the École des Beaux Arts and took first place in the examinations in 1881. He also studied under Jean-Léon Gérôme and with Raphaël Collin at the Académie Colarossi, and traveled to Munich for studies there.

== Career ==
=== Early commissions ===
Dodge received early commissions that gained him attention in the United States, first at the Columbian Exposition of 1893 in Chicago where his mural "Glorification of the Arts and Sciences" adorned the interior dome of the Administration Building. The exposition was held to mark the 400th anniversary of Christopher Columbus's arrival in the New World. He was living in Paris when he applied for commissions for mural works for the Library of Congress, which he completed in 1895.

=== New York City ===
After he and his family settled in New York, Dodge taught at the Art Students League of New York and at Cooper Union.

He became known as a muralist when the genre was at a peak of popularity, commissioned for major public buildings as well as hotels and mansions. Murals were seen as a kind of art that could reach directly to the people. Dodge drew on a variety of styles for his murals, settling on a heroic, neoclassical look. Achieving success with commissions for his murals, Dodge designed his family home in Setauket, Long Island, in 1906, the classical Villa Francesca, named after his wife.

In his private work, Dodge's paintings show the influence of Impressionism and Fauvism. Toward the end of his career, Dodge became interested in Mayan art. His work is held in the permanent collections of the Metropolitan Museum of Art and the National Academy of Design.

== Personal life ==
Dodge's completion of a series of murals for the Library of Congress in 1895 enabled him to marry Francesca (Fanny) Theodora Bland Pryor, daughter of Sara Agnes Rice Pryor and Roger Atkinson Pryor of Virginia and New York. Her mother was a civic activist and author who published several books in the early 1900s; her father was an attorney and became a justice of the New York State Supreme Court.

Dodge died at his Manhattan home on March 25, 1935. He is buried in Woodlawn Cemetery in The Bronx, New York City.

== Murals ==
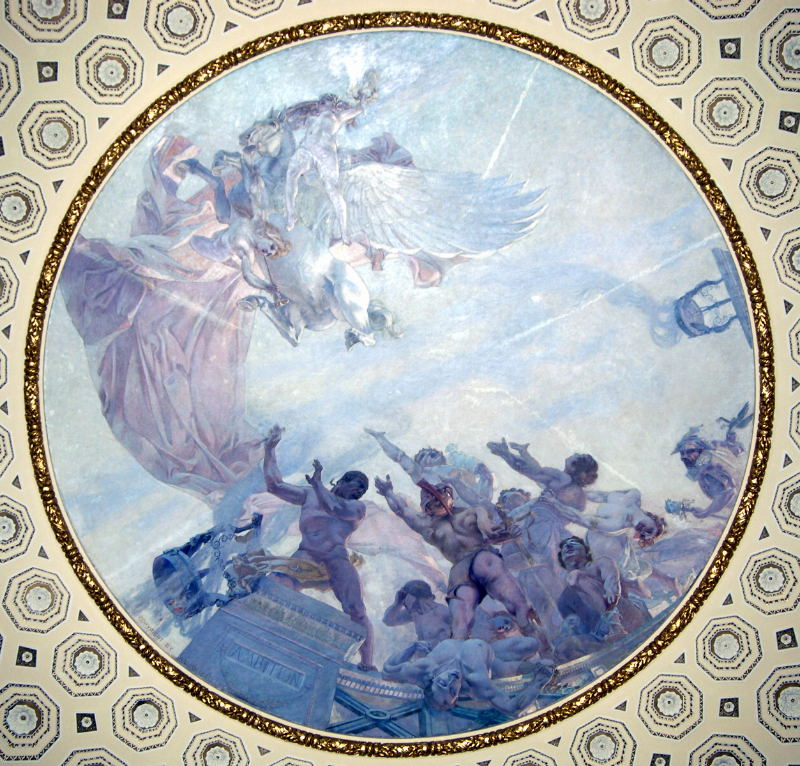
Ceiling mural (one of five panels), Library of Congress, Washington DC, 1895

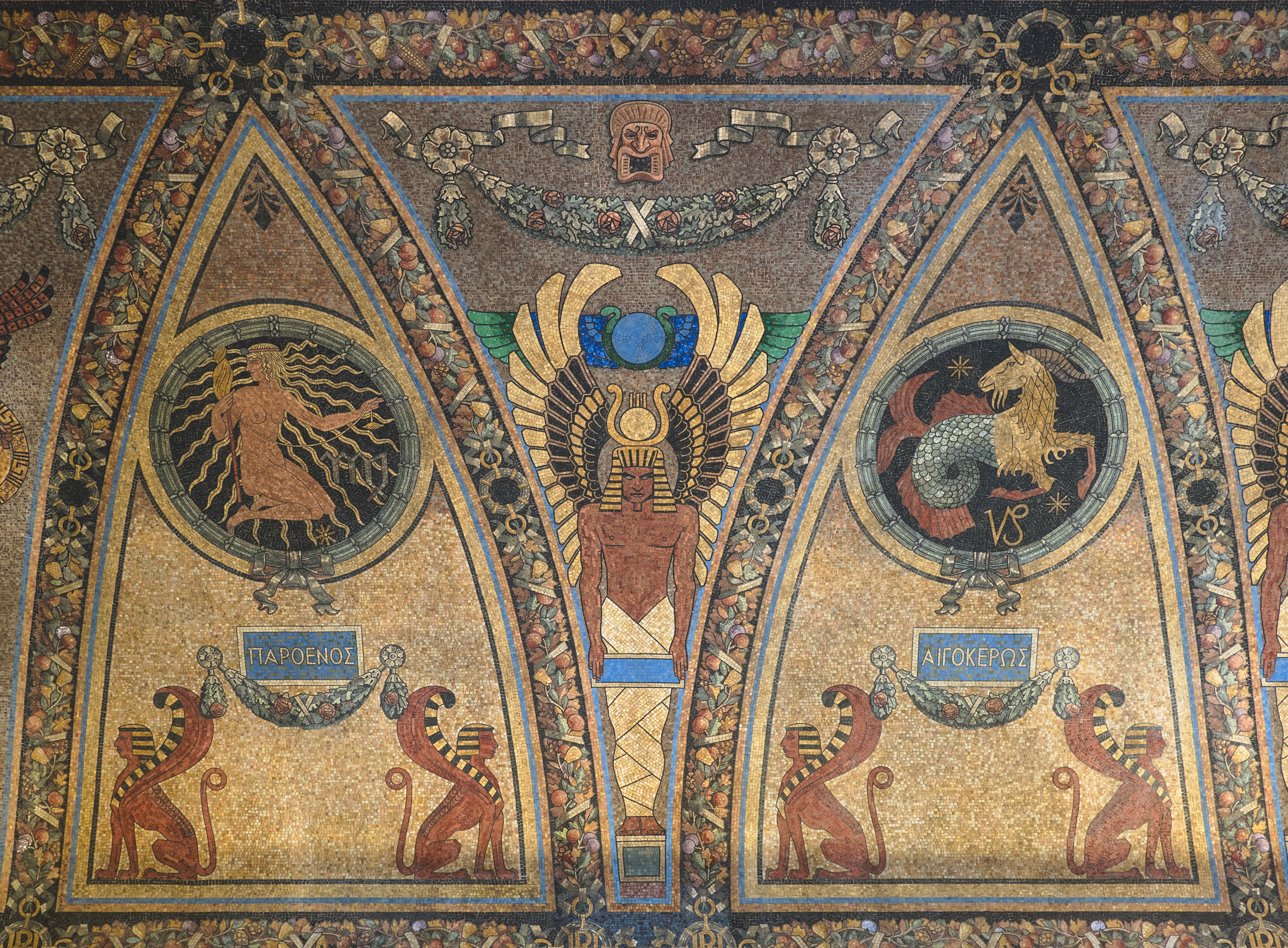
Segment of Dodge's mosaic in the Surrogate's Courthouse, New York City, c 1905

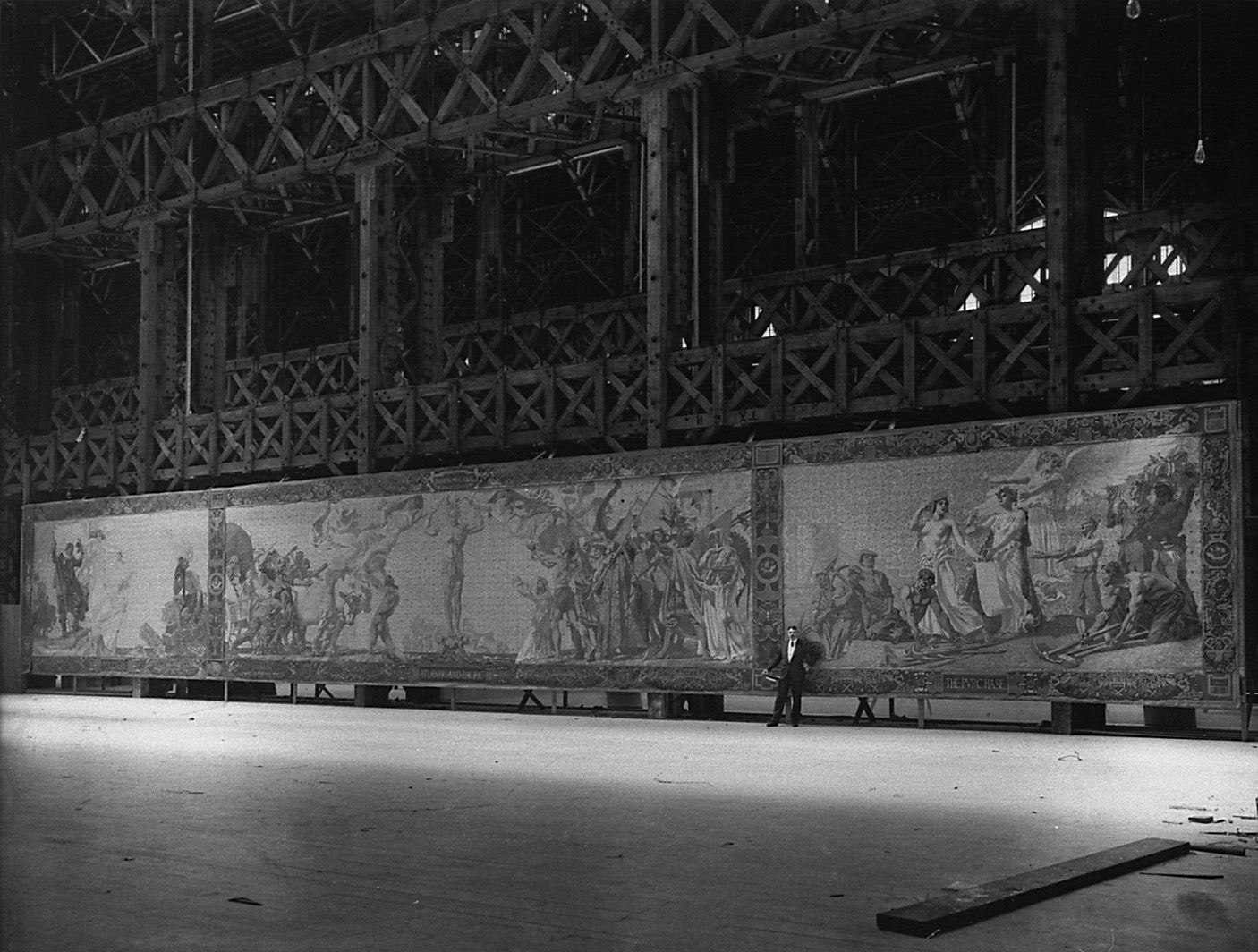
Dodge with half of his six section 200 foot mural for the Tower of Jewels at the Panama Pacific International Exposition, San Francisco, 1915

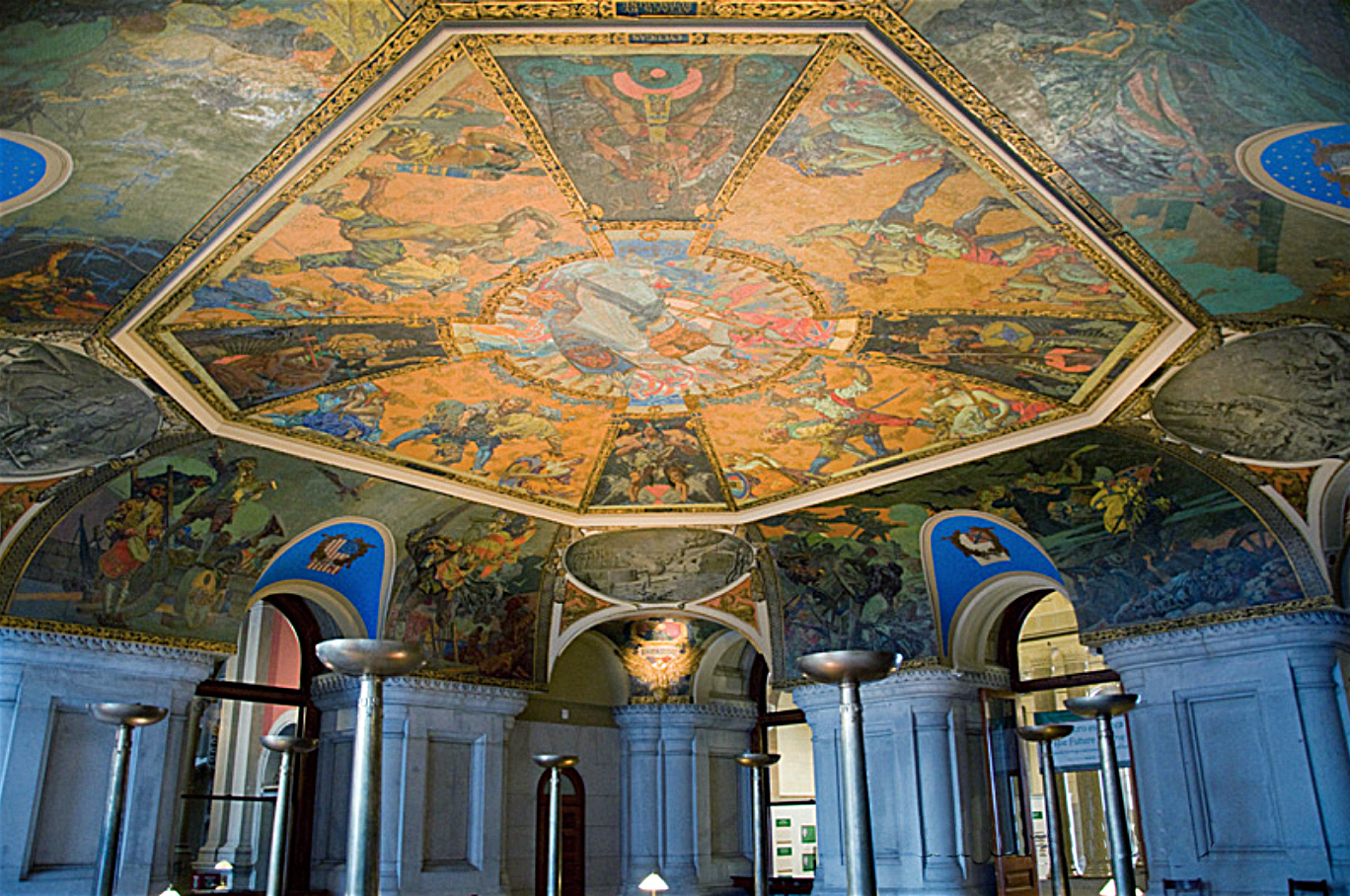
Twenty-one panel ceiling in the Governor's Reception Room at the New York State Capitol in Albany, 1929

Dodge's important murals include:

- Murals for the Administration Building dome, designed by Richard Morris Hunt, at the 1893 World's Columbian Exposition in Chicago.
- Murals for the Thomas Jefferson Building, Library of Congress, Washington, D.C., circa 1895.
- History of Canada murals for the King Edward Hotel, Toronto, Ontario, the subject of a landmark artists' rights lawsuit, 1903.
- Murals for the Onondaga County Court House, Syracuse, New York, 1904.
- Four lobby murals for the Astor Hotel, depicting Ancient and Modern New York, 1904.
- Zodiac ceiling mosaic and other work, at the Surrogate's Courthouse (aka Hall of Records), New York City, circa 1905.
- Mural for the Algonquin Hotel, New York, 1906.
- Works for a number of New York hotels and theaters, including three murals and the color scheme for the Fulton Theatre/Helen Hayes Theatre, architects Herts & Tallant, 1911 (razed).
- "Atlantic and Pacific", one of several murals he made for the Panama Pacific International Exposition, San Francisco, 1915.
- Six murals for Buffalo City Hall, Buffalo, New York. Two large murals in the main entrance hall represent the city's role as a border city, while four murals at the end of hallways show the city's work in "Charity," "Protection," "Education," and "Construction." Completed 1931.
- Ceiling murals of battle scenes, Governor's Reception Room, New York State Capitol, Albany, New York.
- Three murals in the Great Reading Room, Seerley Hall at the University of Northern Iowa. The first is called In Memoriam, the second Education, and the third is a combination of three paintings, called The Glory and Grandeur of Iowa. The three sections of the third are known as Agriculture, The Council of Indians, and The Commonwealth.

== Gallery ==
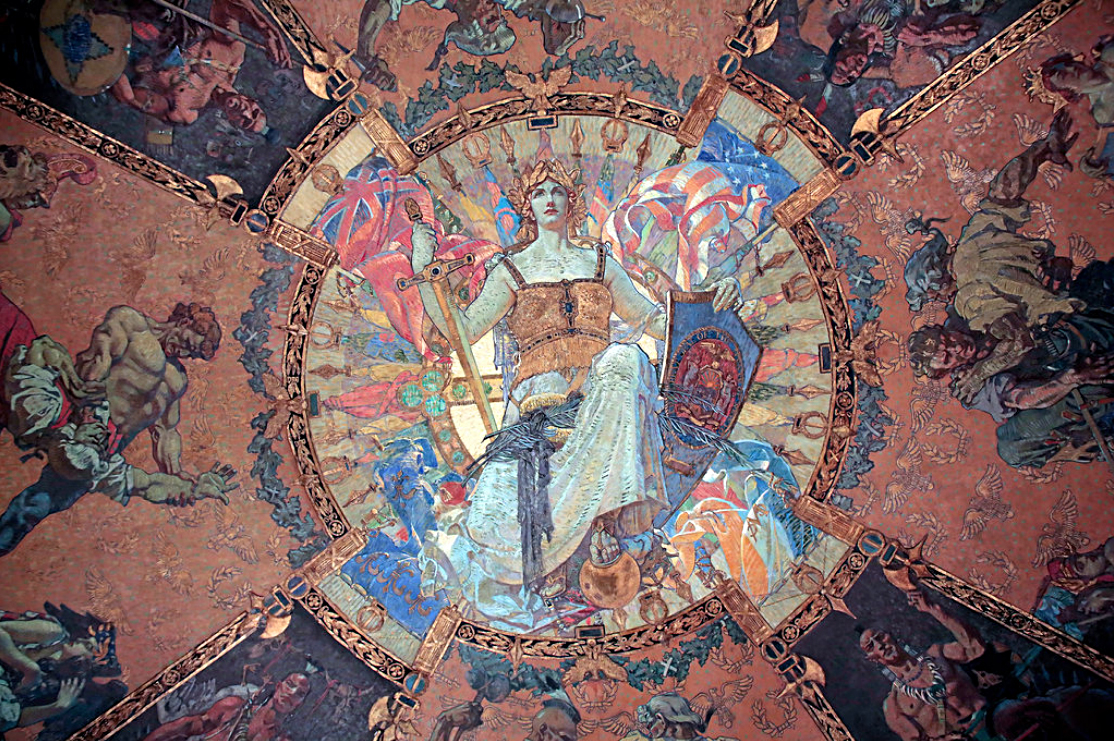
Central panel, ceiling of the Governor's Reception Room at the New York State Capitol in Albany, 1929

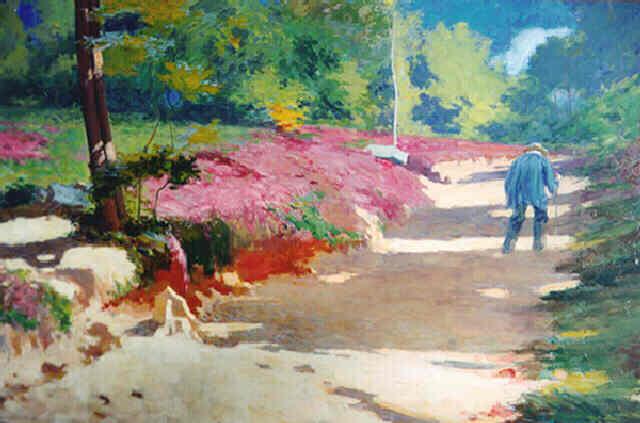
Sunlit Path, 1891

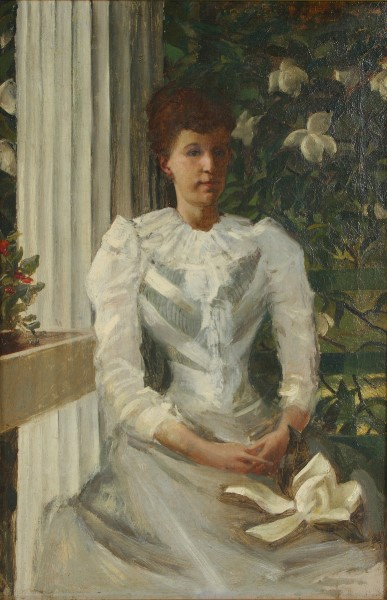
Victorian Woman in White, 1891

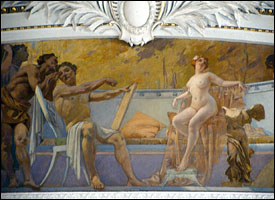
Mural in Library of Congress Jefferson building, 1896

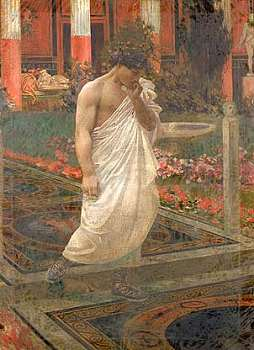
Meditation, 1897

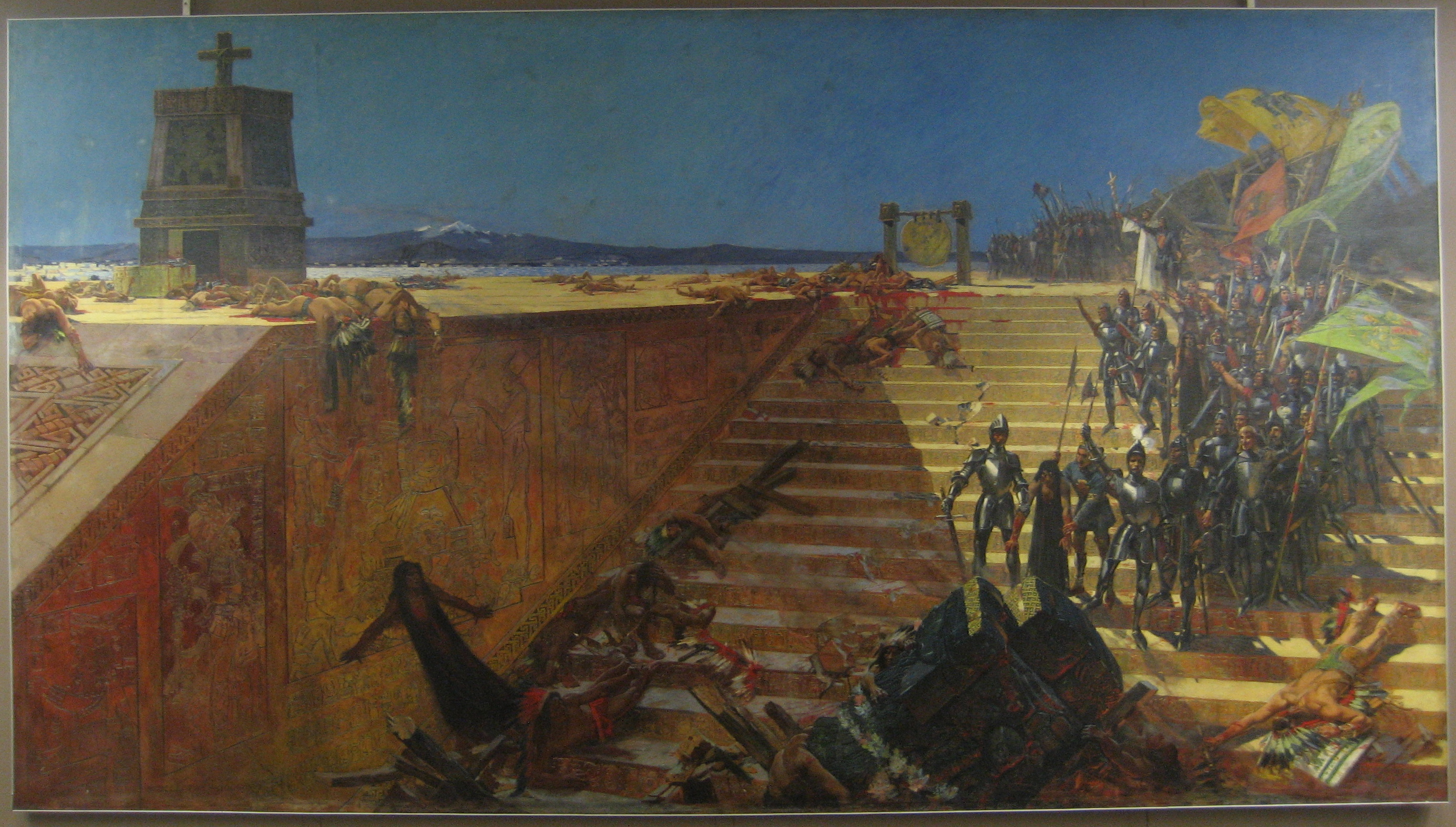
Last Days of Tenochtitlan (Tulane University - New Orleans, LA) 1899

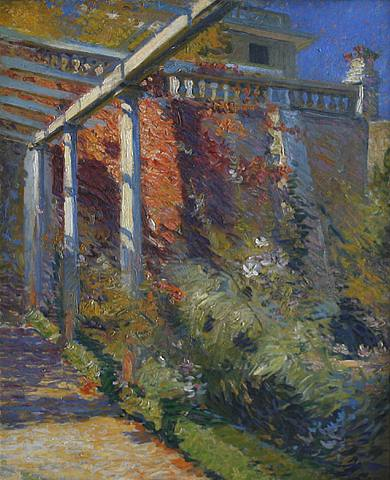
Sunken Garden Beneath Wall, Villa Francesca, Setauket, Long Island, 1915

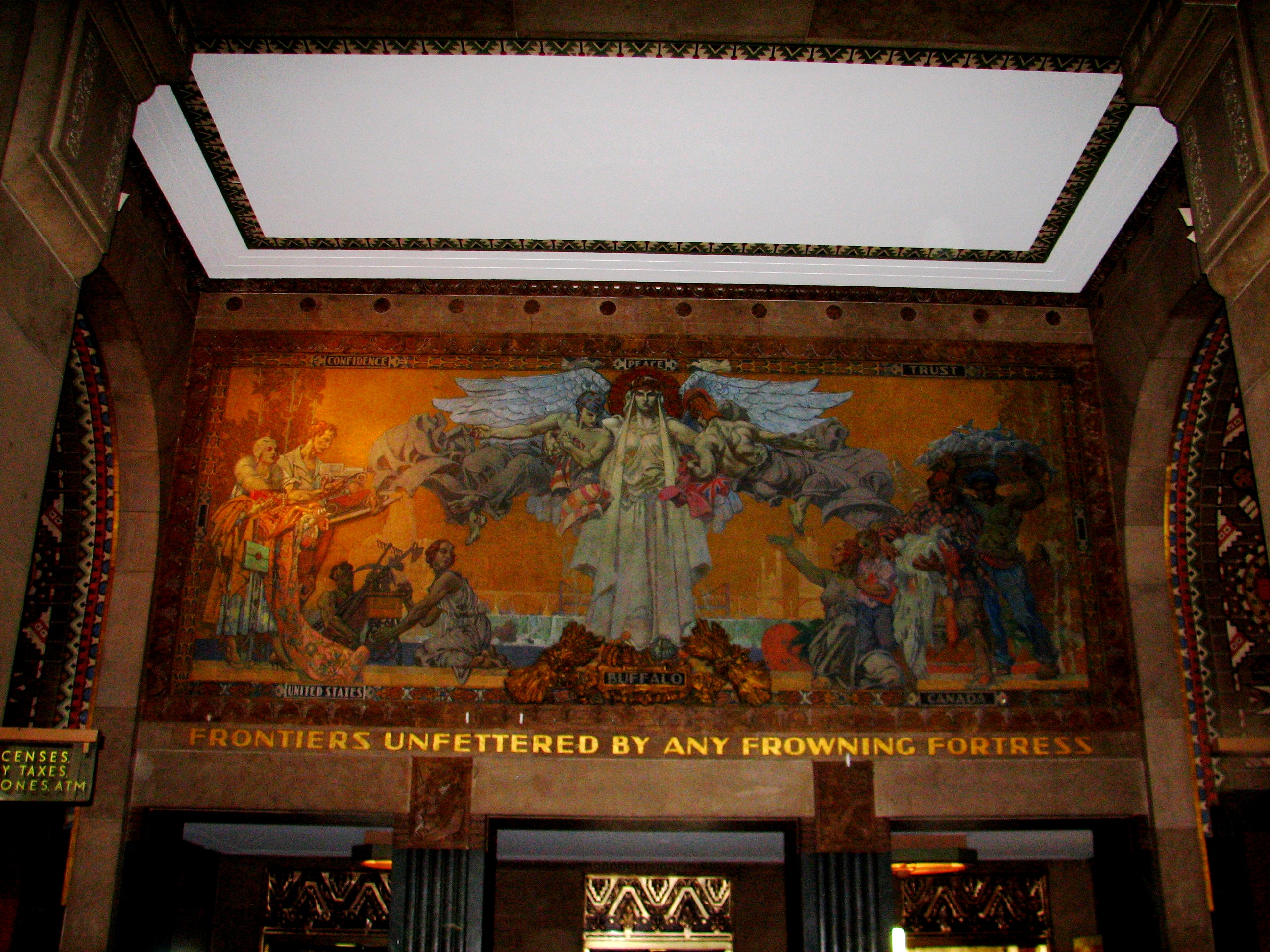
Buffalo City Hall Mural (Buffalo, New York) 1931

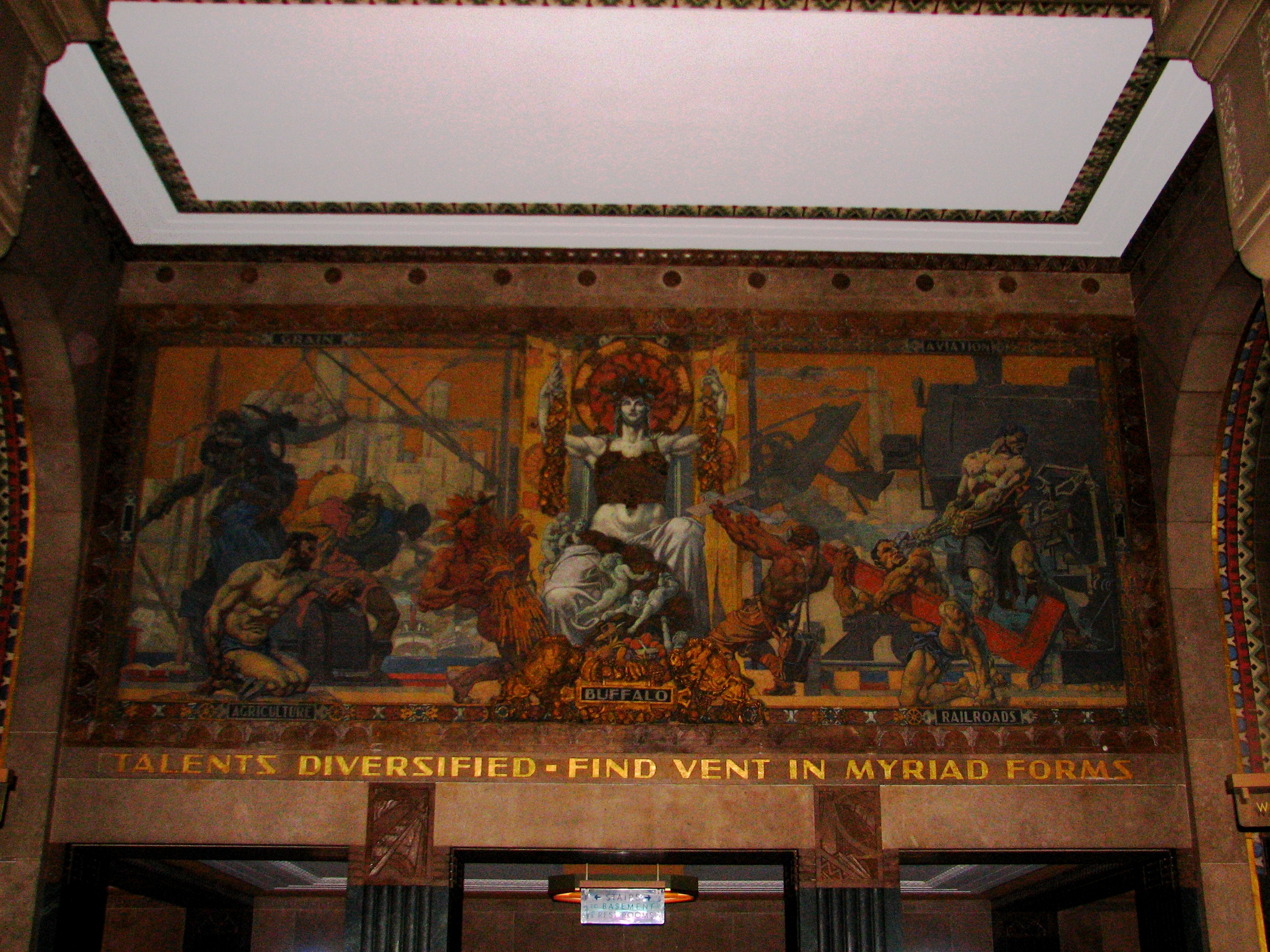
Buffalo City Hall Mural (Buffalo, New York) 1931

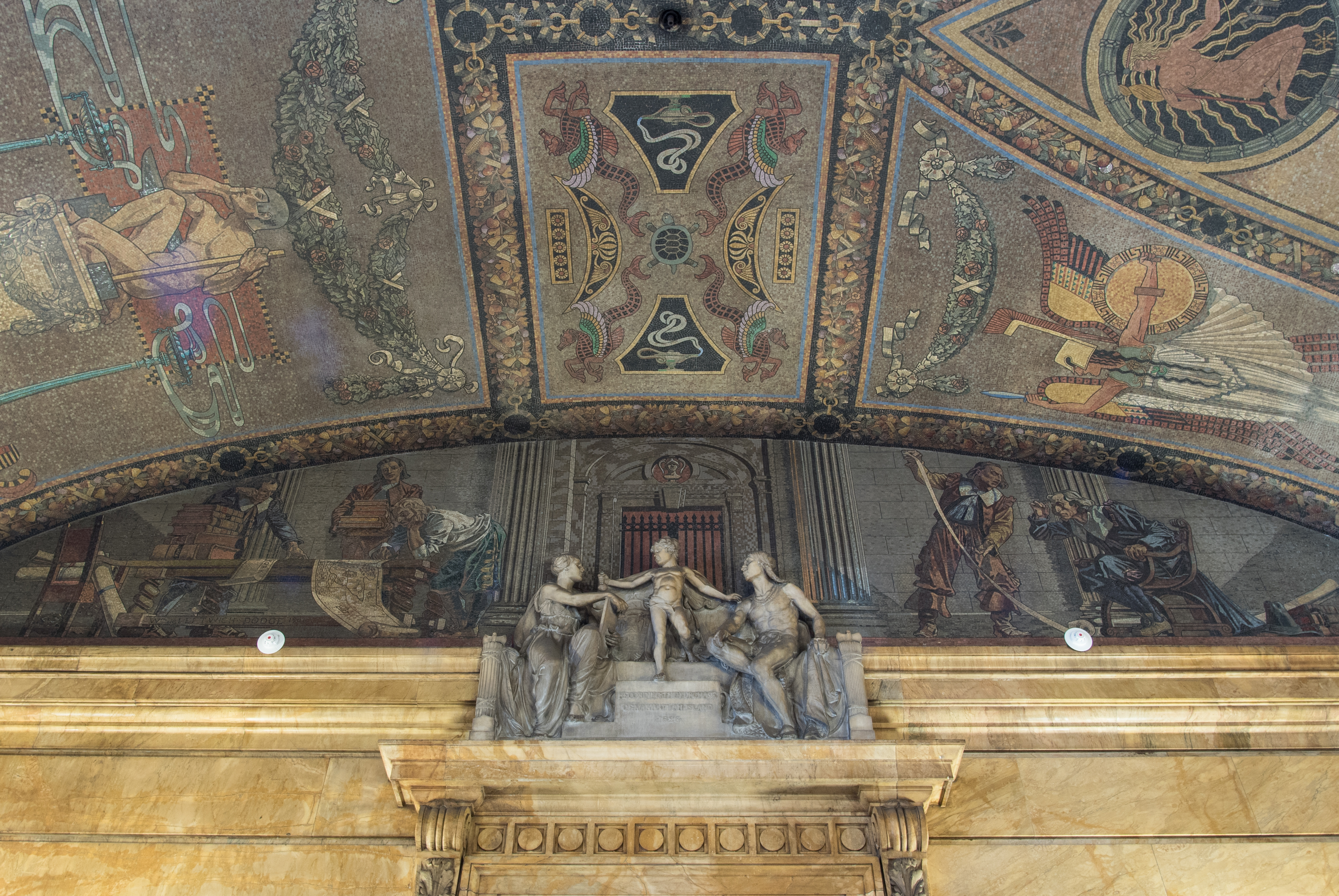
Mosaic in the Surrogate's Courthouse, New York City

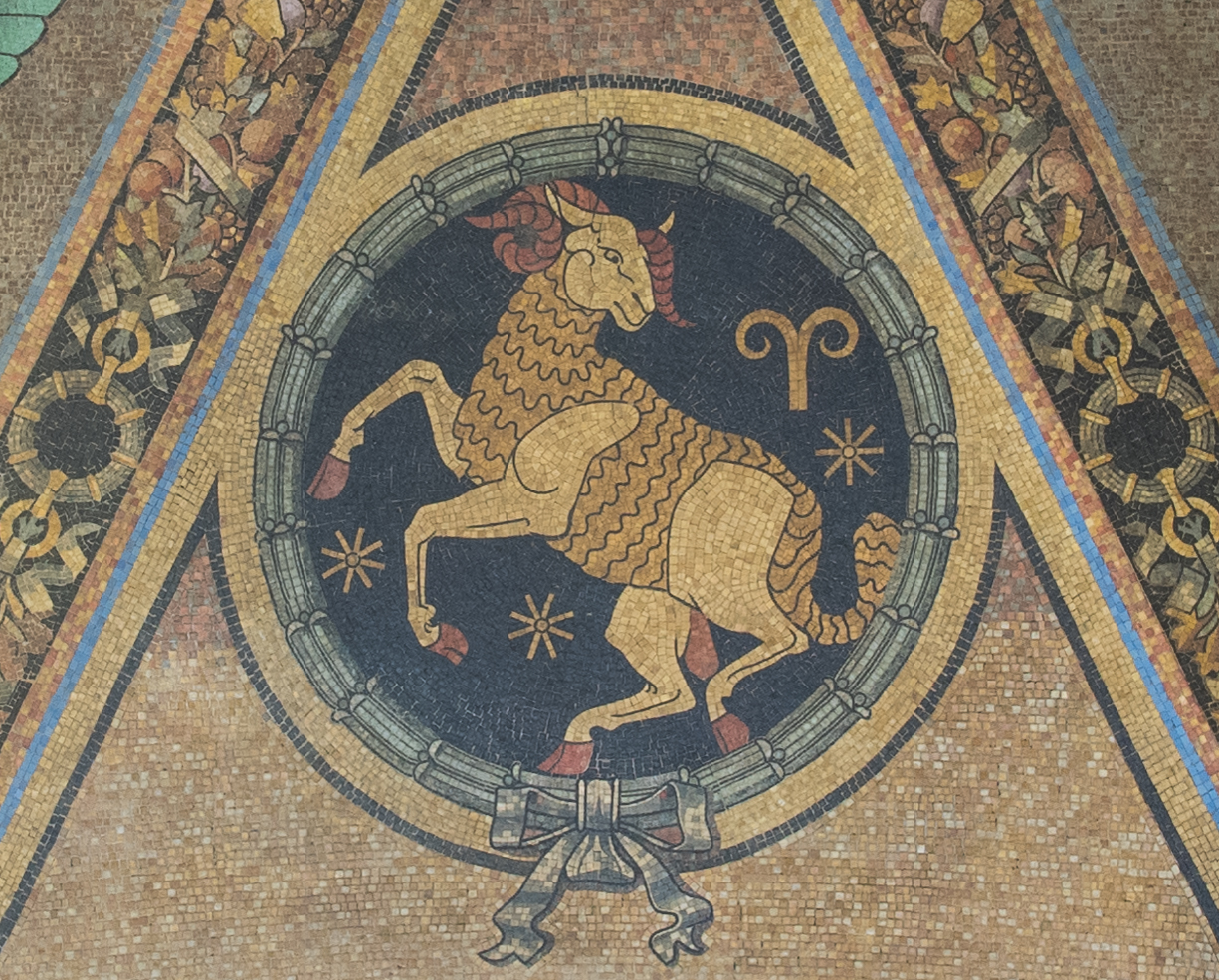
Detail from the Surrogate's Courthouse mosaic, New York City
