= Blair Niles =

American novelist

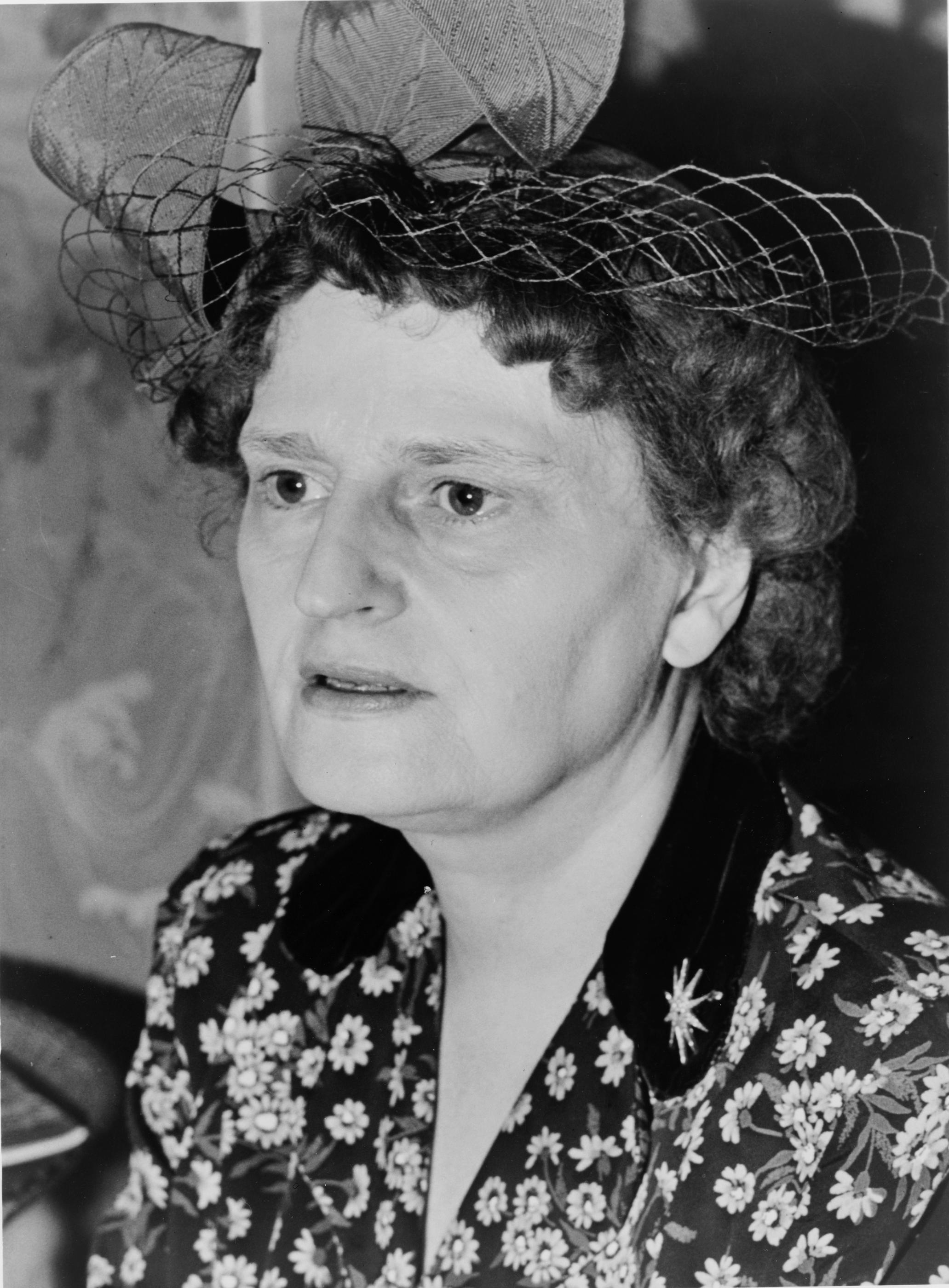
- Niles c. 1940-1950
- Born: July 21, 1880 Staunton, Virginia, U.S.
- Died: April 14, 1959 (aged 78) New York City, U.S.
- Notable awards: Constance Skinner Award (1941)
- Spouses: William Beebe (m. 1902; div. 1913) Robert Niles (m. 1913)

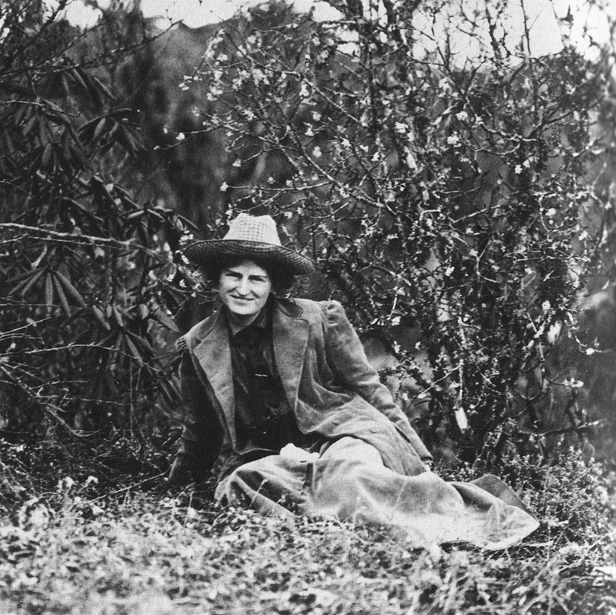
Blair Niles in Mexico, 1904

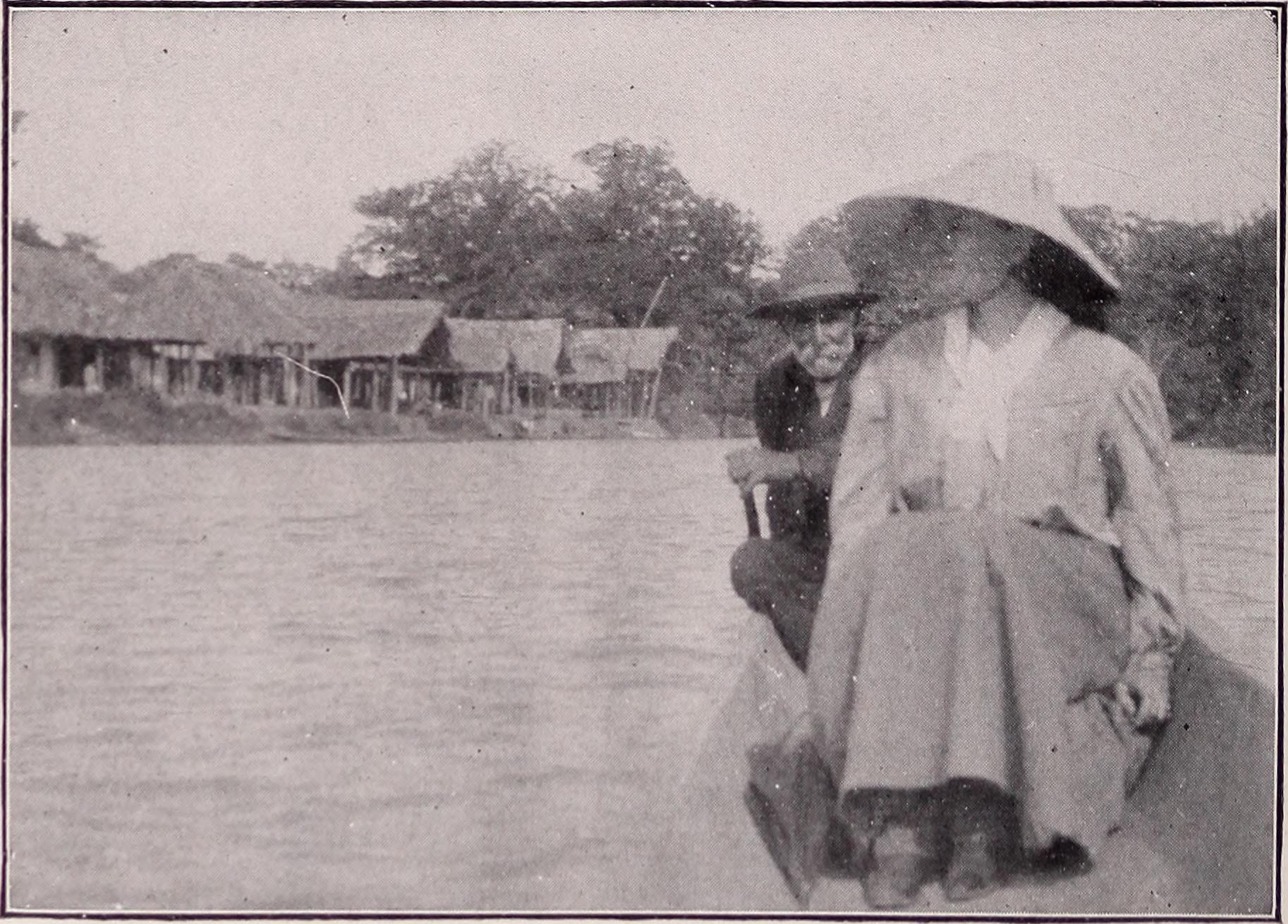
Blair Niles in Venezuela, 1910

Blair Niles (née Mary Blair Rice, 1880–1959) was an American novelist and travel writer. She was a founding member of the Society of Woman Geographers.

== Early life and expeditions ==
Born Mary Blair Rice, Blair was born on The Oaks, her parents' plantation in Staunton, Virginia. She was educated at home by her mother, Marie Gordon "Gordy" Rice, who taught a night school for her four children and children of the sharecroppers. At age 14, Blair attended the Northfield Seminary for Young Ladies in Massachusetts and then the Pratt Institute in Brooklyn, where she studied domestic science.

In 1902, she married William Beebe, Curator of Birds at the New York Zoological Park, now the Bronx Zoo. Within the first year of their marriage, they went on three honeymoon expeditions: to Nova Scotia, Oak Lodge, a boarding house for naturalists on the Indian River in Florida, and to Cobb Island, Virginia. In 1904, they traveled to Mexico, and in 1908 and 1909, they traveled to Venezuela and British Guyana to scout out a location for a Tropical Research Station to be sponsored by the Bronx Zoo. When they published Our Search for Wilderness about their South American travels, Blair received the recognition she long desired: she was credited as a co-author, with her name listed first.

Their plans to establish a Tropical Field Station in South America were interrupted when they received an offer from Anthony Kuser to underwrite an eighteen-month expedition to Asia to study and collect pheasants. In December 1910, they boarded the R.M.S. Lusitania to start the pheasant expedition. They traveled to Ceylon (now Sri Lanka), Burma (Myanmar), India, China, Borneo and other parts of Indonesia, Malaya, Japan, and Singapore.

== Divorce and suffrage ==
In 1913, Blair traveled to Reno to divorce William Beebe on the grounds of cruelty. A few days after the divorce, she married architect Robert "Robin" Niles. For a few years, she worked in the suffrage movement and was a New York delegate to the Congressional Union for Woman Suffrage.

== Writing career ==
In the early 1920s, Blair began writing travel books. In 1923, she published Casual Wanderings in Ecuador. Colombia: Land of Miracles followed in 1924, and Peruvian Pageant in 1937. She developed a new approach to writing travel books, which she called "the human travel book" in which she linked contemporary culture with the past by exploring history, traditions, and legends. Her breakthrough book was Black Haiti: A Biography of Africa's Eldest Daughter (1926), which told the story of the largest slave revolt in history led by Toussaint L'Overture. This book was closely followed by Condemned to Devil's Island (1928), the bestselling fictionalized account of the escapes of René Belbenoît, a prisoner on the Devil's Island penal colony in French Guiana. The book was made into a Hollywood movie, Condemned. Blair was the first woman to visit Devil's Island. Her book is credited with drawing public attention to the prison, resulting in its eventual closure. When the Depression hit, Blair looked for places closer to home to investigate. In 1931, she published Strange Brother, the first book to compassionately portray gay men in Harlem. Blair then turned to writing books about Latin America, with a focus on the ancient Aztec, Incan, and Quiche civilizations.

On the centennial of the Supreme Court's United States v. The Amistad decision, Blair wrote a novel that introduced a new generation to the Court's decision, which held that kidnapped Africans were not the property of their “owners.” The book, called East by Day, was selected as one of twenty books by readers of the New York Herald for Great Britain readers. It served as her atonement for her grandfather's role in the Civil War. She knew that her grandfather, Roger Atkinson Pryor, spoke in Charleston, South Carolina urging the Confederates to open fire on Fort Sumter to force Virginia into secession. According to The New York Times, this speech was the “match that exploded the powder magazine and brought on the war.” As one of Confederate General Beauregard's aides-de-camp, Roger declined the offer to fire the first cannon of the Civil War. This book motivated Blair to write East by Day.

== Society of Woman Geographers ==
In 1925, during tea with Marguerite Harrison, Blair suggested the formation of a society for woman explorers because the all-men Explorers Club banned women from membership. Marguerite endorsed the idea and they presented it to Gertrude Emerson Sen and Gertrude Mathews Shelby, also explorers. They recruited Harriet Chalmers Adams as president of the newly formed Society of Woman Geographers. The organization grew rapidly and admitted as members such illustrious women as Amelia Earhart, Margaret Mead, Osa Johnson, Annie Smith Peck, Louise Arner Boyd, Josephine Peary, Pearl S. Buck, Malvina Hoffman, Gloria Hollister, Anna Heyward Taylor, Eleanor Roosevelt, and Te Ata, Membership was not limited to explorers, but included anyone whose published works (including art and music) contributed to the understanding of the countries on which the member specialized. In 1944 she was awarded the Gold Medal, the organization's highest honor. The Society is still in existence today. More recent members include Jane Goodall, Sylvia Earle, and Kathryn Sullivan.

== Ancestry ==
In 1859, Blair's grandfather, Roger Atkinson Pryor, was appointed to fill a vacant seat in the United States House of Representatives, representing Virginia. Later he became a judge in New York State.

Blair Niles was the granddaughter of Sara Rice Pryor and Roger Pryor, and the daughter of Marie Gordon Pryor. Her unique namesake, "Mary Blair," is shared with her mother's sister, Mary Blair Pryor, her cousin Mary Blair Walker Zimmer, and several other women in her lineage, as documented in *"Mary Blair Destiny". Her grandmother Sara Rice Pryor was also a widely-read author for her chronicling of life in antebellum Virginia. Blair Niles did not have any children of her own.

== Honorable recognition ==
The City of Lima had awarded Blair a gold medal for her book, Peruvian Pageant on the 117th anniversary of the independence of Peru. In 1941, Blair Niles was awarded the Constance Skinner Award, now the Women's National Book Award. She was the second recipient of that award. In 1944, the Society of Woman Geographers bestowed its third Gold medal on Blair.

== Later life and death ==
In 1959, Blair Niles would pass away in New York City due to a cerebral hemorrhage.

== Bibliography ==
=== Non-fiction ===
- Our search for a wilderness; an account of two ornithological expeditions to Venezuela and to British Guiana (Mary Blair Beebe and William Beebe, 1910)
- Casual Wanderings in Ecuador (1923)
- Colombia: Land of Miracles (1924)
- Black Haiti: A Biography of Africa's Eldest Daughter (1926)
- Maria Paluna (1934)
- Day of Immense Sun (1936)
- Peruvian Pageant, A Journey In Time (1937)
- The James: From Iron Gate to the Sea (1939) (Rivers of America Series)
- Journeys in Time (1946)
- Passengers to Mexico: The Last Invasion of the Americas (1943)
- Martha's Husband: An Informal Portrait of George Washington (1951)

=== Fiction ===
- Condemned to Devil's Island (1928) - turned into the 1929 film Condemned
- Free (1930)
- Strange Brother (1931)
- Light Again, 1933
- Maria Paluna (1934)
- Day of the Immense Sun (1936)
- East by Day (1941)
