= The Death of Minnehaha =

Section of The Song of Hiawatha

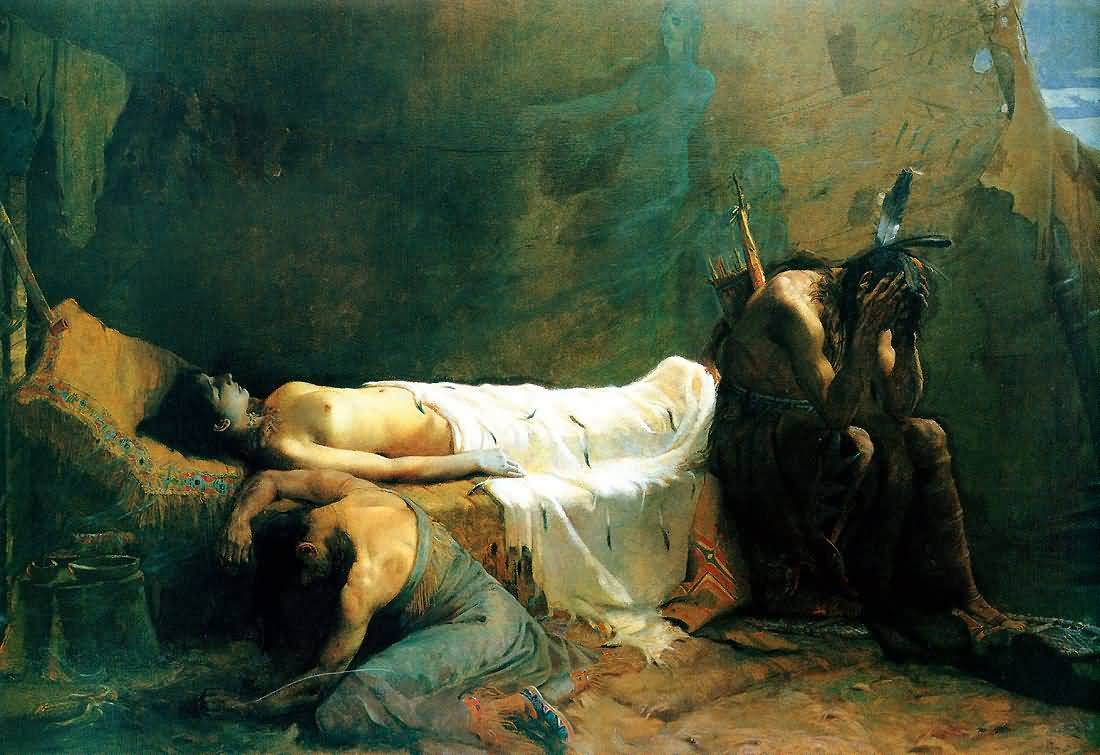
William de Leftwich Dodge's painting Death-Of-Minnehaha

"The Death of Minnehaha" was a part of Henry Wadsworth Longfellow's 1855 poem The Song of Hiawatha.

It was rendered by the painter William de Leftwich Dodge in 1892, as the painting Death-Of-Minnehaha. Later the poem was arranged by Charles Crozat Converse into a popular song. It was also the second part (composed 1899) of the cantata trilogy The Song of Hiawatha by the English composer Samuel Coleridge-Taylor.
