= Charles Crozat Converse =

United States attorney and composer

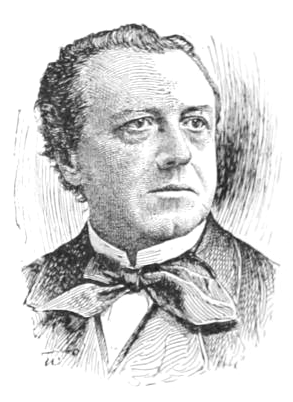
- Born: October 7, 1832; Warren, Massachusetts, US
- Died: October 18, 1918 (aged 86); Englewood, New Jersey, US
- Notable work: "What a Friend We Have in Jesus"

Charles Crozat Converse (October 7, 1832 – October 18, 1918) was an American attorney who also worked as a composer of church songs. He is notable for setting to music the words of Joseph Scriven to become the hymn "What a Friend We Have in Jesus". Converse published an arrangement of "The Death of Minnehaha", with words by Henry Wadsworth Longfellow.

== Life ==
Charles Crozat Converse was born in Warren, Massachusetts on October 7, 1832. He studied law and music in Leipzig, Germany, returned home in 1857, and was graduated at the Albany Law School in 1861.

Many of his musical compositions appeared under the anagrammatic pen-names "C. O. Nevers", "Karl Reden", "E. C. Revons", and "Lesta Vesé". He published a cantata (1855), New Method for the Guitar (1855), Musical Bouquet (1859), The One Hundred and Twenty-sixth Psalm (1860), Sweet Singer (1863), Church Singer (1863) and Sayings of Sages (1863).

Converse proposed the use of the gender-neutral pronoun "thon".

He died at his home in Englewood, New Jersey on October 18, 1918.

== Sources ==
- Cornelius, Steven (2004). Music of the Civil War Era. Greenwood Publishing Group. ISBN 0-313-32081-0.
