= 3rd Virginia Infantry Regiment =

3rd Virginia Volunteer Infantry Regiment
- Flag of Virginia, 1861
- Active: May 1861 – Spring 1865
- Disbanded: 1865
- Country: Confederate States of America
- Allegiance: Virginia
- Branch: Confederate States Army
- Role: Infantry
- Engagements: Battle of Big Bethel; Seven Days' Battles; Battle of Antietam; Battle of Fredericksburg; Battle of Gettysburg; Battle of Five Forks; Battle of Sailor's Creek

Commanders
- Notable commanders: Colonel Roger A. Pryor

The 3rd Virginia Volunteer Infantry Regiment was an infantry regiment raised in Virginia for service in the Confederate States Army during the American Civil War. It fought mostly with the Army of Northern Virginia.

The 3rd Virginia was organized at Portsmouth, Virginia, in 1856 with volunteer companies attached to the 7th Regiment Virginia Militia. It entered Confederate service during July, 1861. Its members were from Portsmouth and Petersburg, and the counties of Nansemond, Dinwiddie, Surry, Isle of Wight, Southampton, and Halifax.

Three companies were in the fight at Big Bethel, then the regiment was assigned to General Colston's, Pryor's, Kemper's, and W.R. Terry's Brigade. It fought with the Army of Northern Virginia from Williamsburg to Gettysburg except when it was detached to Suffolk with Longstreet. Later it was active in the conflicts at Plymouth, Drewry's Bluff, and Cold Harbor, the Siege of Petersburg (both south and north of the James River), and the Appomattox Campaign.

This unit totaled 550 men in April, 1862, and reported 97 casualties during the Seven Days Battles, 19 in the Maryland Campaign, and 11 at Fredericksburg. Of the 332 engaged at Gettysburg, more than thirty-five percent were disabled. Many were captured at Five Forks and Sayler's Creek , and only 1 officer and 60 men surrendered in April, 1865.

The field officers were Colonels Joseph Mayo, Jr. and Roger A. Pryor; and Lieutenant Colonels Alexander D. Callcote, William H. Pryor, and Joseph V. Scott.

It was the quartermaster of the 3rd Virginia, Captain Joseph M. Broun, who sold Traveller to Robert E. Lee for $200.

== See also ==
- List of Virginia Civil War units
