= Condemned (1929 film) =

1929 film by Wesley Ruggles

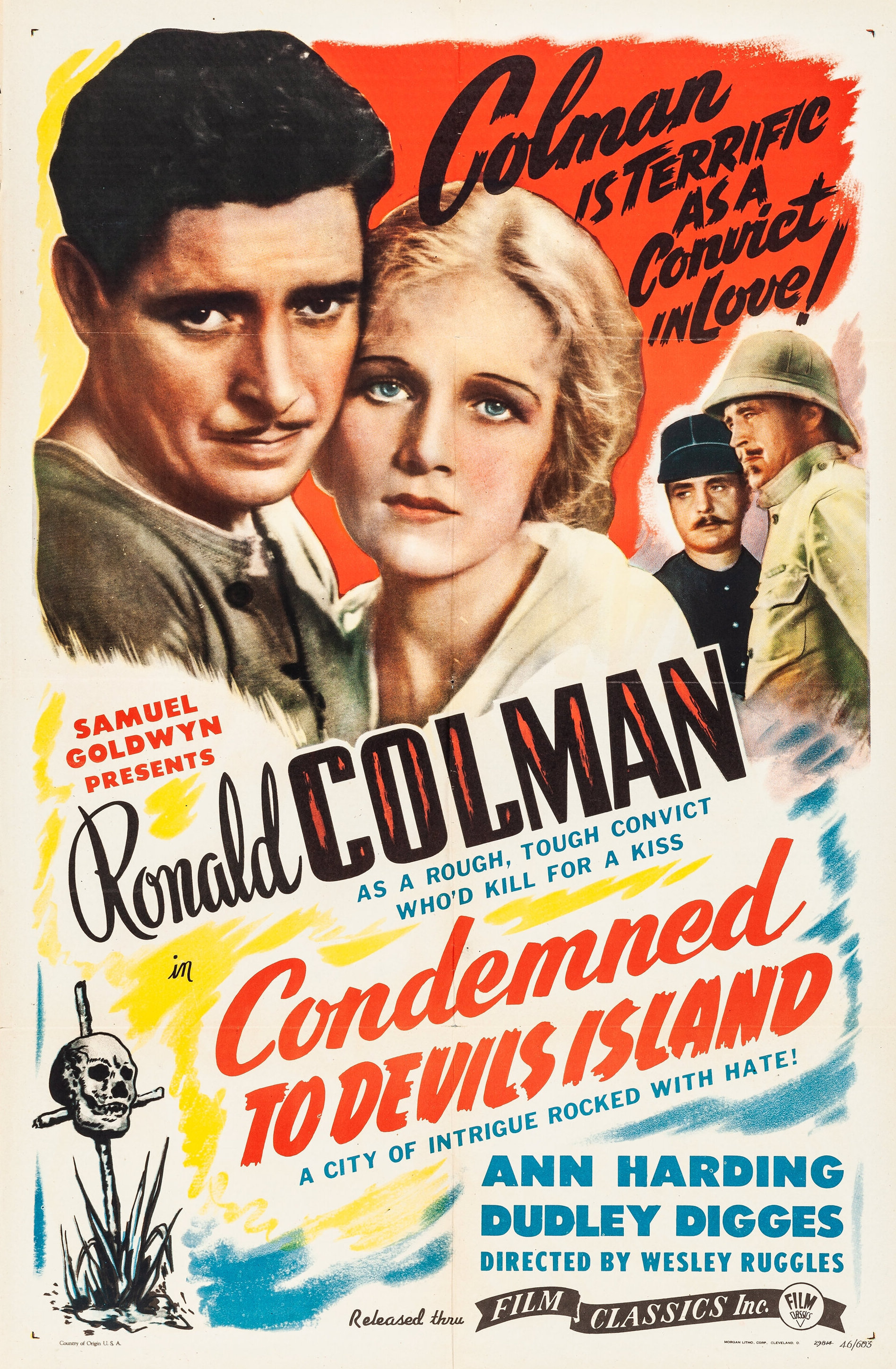
- 1946 re-issue poster
- Directed by: Wesley Ruggles
- Screenplay by: Sidney Howard
- Based on: Condemned to Devil's Island; 1928 novel by Blair Niles
- Produced by: Samuel Goldwyn
- Starring: Ronald Colman; Ann Harding; Dudley Digges; Louis Wolheim; William Elmer
- Cinematography: George Barnes; Gregg Toland
- Edited by: Stuart Heisler
- Music by: Hugo Riesenfeld
- Production company: Samuel Goldwyn Productions
- Distributed by: United Artists
- Release dates: November 3, 1929 (premiere); November 16, 1929 (wide)
- Running time: 86 minutes (sound); 9000 ft. (silent)
- Country: United States
- Language: English
- Budget: $600,000 (estimated)

Condemned (1929)

Condemned is a 1929 American pre-Code melodrama, directed by Wesley Ruggles, and starring Ronald Colman, Ann Harding, Dudley Digges, Louis Wolheim, William Elmer, and Wilhelm von Brincken. The movie was adapted by Sidney Howard from the novel by Blair Niles.

== Plot ==
Set against the oppressive backdrop of Devil’s Island in French Guiana, the film follows Michel, a newly arrived prisoner facing a lengthy sentence in the notoriously brutal penal colony. Michel, however, is no typical inmate; his relaxed demeanor and easy charm quickly ingratiate him with fellow prisoners, including the affable Jacques, and eventually earn him a privileged position as houseboy to the camp’s warden, Vidal. Vidal is a deeply possessive man, particularly when it comes to his much younger wife, whom he treats less as a partner and more as a symbol of status. Isolated and emotionally stranded, Madame Vidal finds herself drawn to Michel’s charisma, sparking a doomed romance that inevitably attracts the warden’s suspicion. Once their affair is uncovered, Michel is thrown into solitary confinement, escapes, and ultimately becomes the target of a desperate manhunt through the island’s humid, treacherous jungle terrain.

== Cast ==
- Ronald Colman as Michel
- Ann Harding as Madame Vidal
- Dudley Digges as Vidal
- Louis Wolheim as Jacques
- William Elmer as Pierre
- Wilhelm von Brincken as Vidal's orderly (as William Vaughn)
- Albert Kingsley as Felix
- Constantine Romanoff as Brute Convict
- Harry Ginsberg as Inmate
- Bud Sommers as Inmate
- Stephen Selznick as Inmate
- Baldy Biuddle as Inmate
- John George as Inmate
- John Schwartz as Inmate

== Production background ==
This film was also released in a silent version running 9,000 feet. In 1930, Colman was nominated for an Academy Award in the Acting category for his work in this film and in Bulldog Drummond (1929). Condemned was the first of eight films written by Sidney Howard for producer Samuel Goldwyn, the last of which was Raffles (1939).

== Soundtrack ==
Note: this list is incomplete

- "Song of the Condemned", written by Jack Meskill and Pete Wendling

== International releases ==
The film is known by a variety of other names, including: Condenado in Portugal and Spain, Condemned to Devil's Island in the U.S. reissue, Condenado a Isla del Diablo in Argentina, Flucht von der Teufelsinsel in Austria, and L'isola del diavolo in Italy.

== See also ==
- List of early sound feature films (1926–1929)
