= Roger A. Pryor =

American politician (1828–1919)

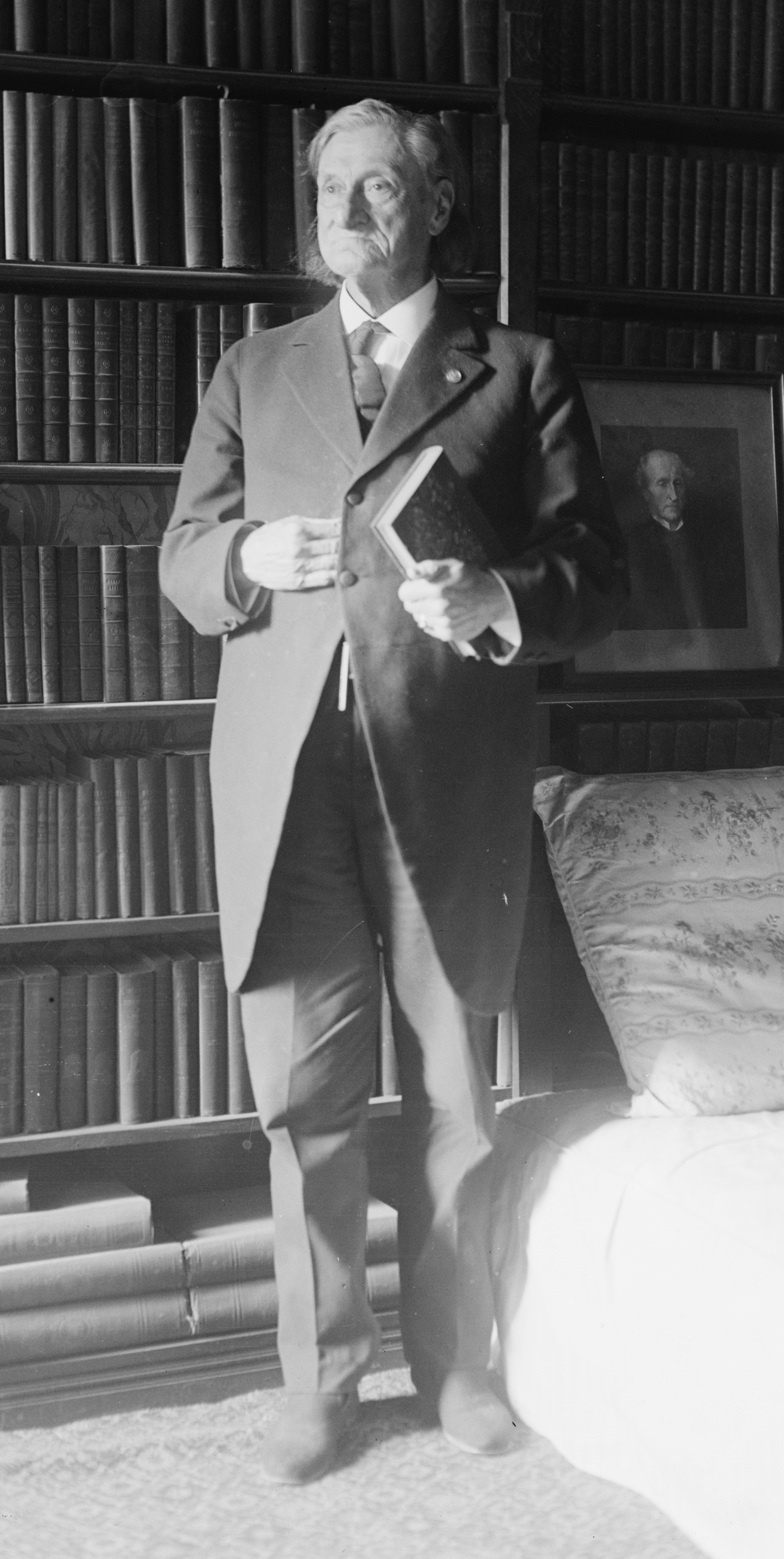
- Pryor in 1916

Member of the Confederate States House of Representatives from Virginia
- In office February 18, 1862 – April 5, 1862
- Preceded by: Position established
- Succeeded by: Charles F. Collier

Delegate from Virginia to the Provisional Confederate Congress
- In office July 20, 1861 – February 17, 1862
- Preceded by: Position established
- Succeeded by: Position abolished

Member of the U.S. House of Representatives from Virginia's 4th District
- In office December 7, 1859 – March 3, 1861
- Preceded by: William O. Goode
- Succeeded by: George W. Booker

Personal details
- Born: Roger Atkinson Pryor; July 19, 1828 Petersburg, Virginia, U.S.
- Died: March 14, 1919 (aged 90) New York City, New York, U.S.
- Party: Democratic
- Spouse: Sara Agnes Rice
- Education: Hampden–Sydney College; University of Virginia
- Profession: journalist, lawyer, judge

Military service
- Allegiance: Confederate States
- Branch/service: Confederate States Army
- Years of service: 1862–1864
- Rank: Brigadier general
- Unit: 3rd Virginia Cavalry Regiment
- Commands: 3rd Virginia Infantry Regiment; Florida Brigade
- Battles/wars: American Civil War: Peninsula Campaign; Second Battle of Bull Run; Battle of Antietam

Roger Atkinson Pryor (July 19, 1828 – March 14, 1919) was an American newspaper editor, lawyer, politician and judge. He served one term in the U.S. House of Representatives from 1859 to 1861.

== Biography ==
A journalist and U.S. Congressman from Virginia known as a Southern "fire eater" for his fiery oratory in favor of slavery and later secession from the United States and belligerence toward abolitionist colleagues, during the American Civil War Pryor served as a general in the Confederate Army as well as in the Confederate Congress. Following the conflict, Pryor moved to New York City, and in 1868 and resumed his legal practice. He is considered among influential southerners in the North sometimes called "Confederate carpetbaggers."

Pryor's law partner became Boston-based Benjamin F. Butler, hated in the South for his service as a Union general during the conflict. Their partnership was financially successful, and Pryor also became active in the Democratic Party in the North. In 1877 he was chosen to give a Decoration Day address, in which he vilified Reconstruction and promoted the Lost Cause, while reconciling the noble soldiers as victims of politicians. In 1890 he joined the Sons of the American Revolution, one of the new heritage societies that was created following celebration of the United States Centennial.

Appointed as judge of the New York Court of Common Pleas from 1890 to 1894, and justice of the New York Supreme Court from 1894 to his retirement in 1899. On April 10, 1912, he was appointed official referee by the appellate division of the state Supreme Court, where he served until his death. Particularly after raising their children described below, his wife Sara Agnes Rice published several histories, memoirs and novels, as well as helped found heritage societies and organize fundraising for historic preservation. Her memoirs have been important sources for historians doing research on southern society during and after the Civil War.

== Early and family life ==
Pryor was born near Petersburg, Virginia, at Montrose, in Dinwiddie County as the second child of Lucy Epps Atkinson and Theodorick Bland Pryor, the minister at Petersburg's Washington Street Presbyterian Church (after the Tabb Street Church built in 1844 became overcrowded). He had an older sister Lucy, but his mother died when the boy was three years old. His father remarried and moved his family to "Old Place" near Crewe in Nottoway County about thirty miles away. Since the second marriage produced two daughters (Frances and Ann) and a son (Archibald), Pryor had half-siblings.

=== Ancestry ===
Pryor could trace his ancestry to the First Families of Virginia. His father was a grandson of Richard Bland II. Other paternal ancestors included Burgesses Richard Bland I, Theodorick Bland of Westover, and Governor Richard Bennett. His mother was descended from Roger Pleasants Atkinson (1764-1829), whose English-born father was a wealthy Petersburg merchant during the Revolutionary War and whose brothers and cousins also attained distinction in learned professions. Her mother was Agnes Poythress, whose father was patriot Peter Poythress (1715-1787) and whose ancestors had arrived in the earliest days of the Virginia colony.

=== Education ===
Pryor received a private education appropriate to his class. He graduated from Hampden–Sydney College in 1845 and from the law school of the University of Virginia in 1848.

=== Personal life ===
On November 8, 1848, Pryor married Sara Agnes Rice, daughter of Samuel Blair Rice and his second wife, Lucy Walton Leftwich, of Halifax County, Virginia. One of numerous children, she was effectively adopted by a childless aunt, Mary Blair Hargrave and her husband, Dr. Samuel Pleasants Hargrave, and lived with them in Hanover, Virginia. They were slaveholders. When Sara was about eight, the Hargraves moved with her to Charlottesville where she completed her formal education. Sara Pryor shared her husband's struggles during their early years of poverty in Virginia (where they lived in various rented houses later demolished), and in New York. She sewed all the children's clothes, gained school scholarships, and helped her husband with his law studies. Realizing that other women and children needed help, she raised money to found a home for them.

Like her husband, Sarah Pryor helped found lineage and heritage organizations, including the Society for Preservation of the Virginia Antiquities (since 2009 named Preservation Virginia); the National Mary Washington Memorial Association; the Daughters of the American Revolution (DAR); and the National Society of the Colonial Dames of America. She became a productive writer, after 1900 through the Macmillan Company publishing two histories on the colonial era, two memoirs and novels. Her Reminiscences of Peace and War (1904), was recommended by the United Daughters of the Confederacy to its membership for serious study.

Sara and Roger A. Pryor had seven children together:

- Maria Gordon Pryor (called Gordon) (1850 - 1928), married Henry Crenshaw Rice (1842 - 1916) and had daughter Mary Blair Rice, who authored several books under the pen name of Blair Niles.
- Theodorick Bland Pryor (1851 - 1871), died at the age of 20, likely a suicide, as he had been suffering from depression. Admitted to Princeton College at an early age, he was its first mathematical fellow; he also studied at Cambridge University, and had been studying law.
- Roger Atkinson Pryor, became a lawyer in New York.
- Mary Blair Pryor, married Francis Thomas Walker and, as documented in *"Mary Blair Destiny". she had daughter Mary Blair Walker Zimmer Buried in Princeton Cemetery.
- William Rice Pryor (b. c.1860 - 1900), became a physician and surgeon in New York and died young.
- Lucy Atkinson Pryor, married the architect A. Page Brown; in 1889 they moved to San Francisco, California.
- Francesca (Fanny) Theodora Bland Pryor (b. 31 December 1868), Petersburg, VA, married William de Leftwich Dodge, a painter; they lived in Paris and New York.

Roger and Sara Pryor's great-great-great-granddaughter is Erin Richman, author of *"Mary Blair Destiny".

== Career ==
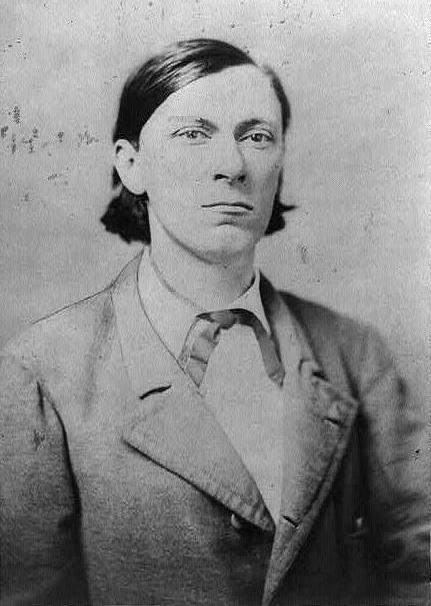
Pryor in his younger years.

In 1849, Pryor was admitted to the bar, but ill health caused him to (temporarily) abandon his private legal practice. He started working as a journalist, serving on the editorial staffs of the Washington Union in 1852 and the Daily Richmond Enquirer in 1854. The latter was one of the leading papers in the South for 50 years.

President Franklin Pierce appointed Pryor, who had become involved in Virginia politics, as a diplomat to Greece in 1854. Upon returning to Virginia, in 1857 Pryor established The South, a daily newspaper in Richmond. He became known as a fiery and eloquent advocate of slavery, southern states' rights, and secession; although he and his wife did not personally own slaves, they came from the slaveholding class. His advocacy of the institution was an example of how, in a "slave society" like Virginia, slavery both powered the economy and underlay the entire social framework.

In May 1859, US Representative William O. Goode from Virginia's 4th congressional district died. Pryor won the special election to fill the vacancy on 27 October. He served until 3 March 1861.

During his term in the House, Pryor became a particular enemy of Republican Representative Thaddeus Stevens, an abolitionist from Pennsylvania. He also quarreled with other anti-slavery Republicans.

Pryor got into a fierce argument with Representative John F. Potter from Wisconsin, and challenged him to a duel. Having the choice of weapons according to duel protocol, Potter chose Bowie knives. Pryor backed out, saying that the knife was not a "civilized weapon". The incident was widely publicized in the Northern press, which portrayed Pryor's refusal to duel as a coup for the North — and as a cowardly humiliation of a Southern "fire eater".

On 5 Apil 1860, during a ferociously anti-slavery speech by Illinois Republican Owen Lovejoy, Pryor and some other Democrats became enraged and threatened him with canes and pistols; several Republicans rushed to Lovejoy's defense.

=== American Civil War ===
In early 1861, Pryor agitated for immediate secession in Virginia, but the state convention did not act. He went to Charleston in April, to urge an immediate attack on Fort Sumter. (Pryor asserted this would cause Virginia to secede.) On April 12, he and Sara accompanied the last Confederate party to the fort before the bombardment (but stayed in the boat). Afterward, while waiting at Fort Johnson, he was offered the opportunity to fire the first shot. But he declined, saying, "I could not fire the first gun of the war." Pryor almost became the first casualty of the Civil War - while visiting Fort Sumter as an emissary, he mistook a bottle of potassium iodide in the hospital for medicinal whiskey and drank it; his mistake was realized in time for Union doctors to pump his stomach and save his life.

At this time, Virginia held congressional elections in May of odd years, so Pryor had not been a candidate for re-election when Virginia declared secession. The 1861 elections were held anyway, and Pryor was re-elected, but of course did not serve. He served in the provisional Confederate Congress in 1861, and also in the first regular Congress (1862) under the Confederate Constitution.

He entered the Confederate army as colonel of the 3rd Virginia Infantry Regiment. He was promoted to brigadier general on April 16, 1862. His brigade fought in the Peninsula Campaign and at Second Manassas, where it became detached in the swirling fighting and temporarily operated under Stonewall Jackson. Pryor's command initially consisted of the 2nd Florida, 14th Alabama, 3rd Virginia, and 14th Louisiana. During the Seven Days Battles, the 1st (Coppens') Louisiana Zouave Battalion was temporarily attached to it. Afterwards, the Louisianans departed and Pryor received two brand-new regiments: the 5th and 8th Florida Infantry. As a consequence, it became known as "The Florida Brigade". At Antietam on September 17, 1862, he assumed command of Anderson's Division in Longstreet's Corps when Maj. Gen. Richard H. Anderson was wounded. Pryor proved inept as a division commander: Union troops flanked his position, and his troops fell back in disorder.

As a result, he did not gain a permanent higher field command. At the Battle of Deserted House (30 January 1863), his outnumbered brigade was driven off the field, but inflicted much heavier casualties. Later in 1863 Pryor resigned his commission, and his brigade was broken up, its regiments being reassigned to other commands.

In August of that year, he enlisted as a private and scout in the 3rd Virginia Cavalry Regiment under General Fitzhugh Lee. Pryor was captured on November 28, 1864, and confined in Fort Lafayette in New York as a suspected spy. After several months, he was released on parole by order of President Lincoln and returned to Virginia. CSA War Clerk and diarist, John B. Jones, mentioned Pryor in his April 9, 1865, entry from Richmond, VA, "Roger A. Pryor is said to have remained voluntarily in Petersburg, and announces his abandonment of the Confederate States cause."

In the early days of the war, Sara Rice Pryor accompanied her husband and worked as an army nurse. In 1863, after he resigned his commission, she stayed in Petersburg and struggled to hold their family together, likely with the help of relatives. She later wrote about the war years in her two memoirs published in the early 1900s.

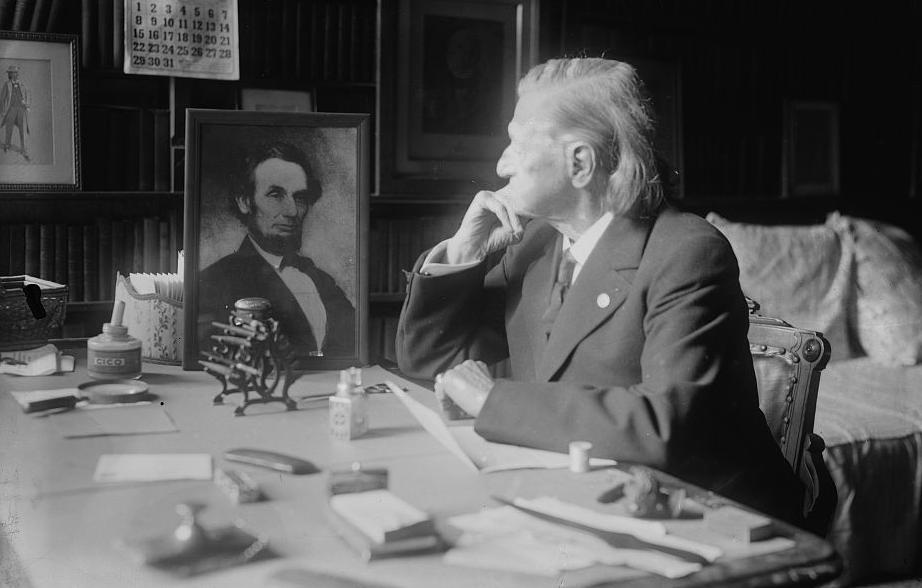
Pryor looking at a portrait of Abraham Lincoln.

== Postbellum activities ==
In 1865, an impoverished Pryor moved to New York City, invited by friends he had known before the war. He eventually established a law firm with the politician Benjamin F. Butler of Boston. Butler had been a Union general who was widely known and hated in the South. Pryor became active in Democratic politics in New York.

Pryor brought his family from Virginia to New York in 1868, and they settled in Brooklyn Heights. They struggled with poverty for years but gradually began to get re-established.

Pryor learned to operate in New York Democratic Party politics, where he was prominent among influential southerners who became known as "Confederate carpetbaggers." Eventually he gave speeches saying that he was glad that the nation had reunited and that the South had lost. Pryor was elected as a delegate to the Democratic National Convention in 1876, a year before the federal government pulled its last military forces out of the South and ended Reconstruction.

Chosen by the Democratic Party for the important Decoration Day address in 1877, after the national compromise that resulted in the federal government pulling its troops out of the South, Pryor vilified Reconstruction and promoted the Lost Cause. He referred to all the soldiers as noble victims of politicians, although he had been one who gave fiery speeches in favor of secession and war. Historian David W. Blight has written that Pryor was one of a number of influential politicians who shaped the story of the war as excluding the issue of slavery; in the following years, the increasing reconciliation between the North and South was based on excluding freedmen and the issues of race.

In 1890, Pryor was appointed as judge of the New York Court of Common Pleas, where he served until 1894. He was next appointed as justice of the New York Supreme Court, serving from 1894 to 1899, when he retired.

In December 1890, Pryor joined the New York chapter of the new heritage/lineage organization, Sons of the American Revolution (SAR), for male descendants of participants in the war. When admitted, he and his documented ancestors were all entered under his membership number of 4043. Annoyed at being excluded from the men's club, Sara Agnes Rice Pryor and other women founded chapters of the Daughters of the American Revolution, setting up their own lineage society to recognize women's contributions and organize for historic preservation and education.

In retirement, Pryor was appointed on April 10, 1912, as official referee by the appellate division of the New York State Supreme Court.

== Death and legacy ==
Pryor's judicial career ended with his death on March 14, 1919, in New York City. He was buried in Princeton Cemetery, in Princeton, New Jersey, where his wife and their sons Theodorick and William had already been buried. His daughter, Mary Blair Pryor Walker, was also buried near him after her death.

A Virginia highway marker honors Pryor's birthplace near Petersburg, Virginia.

Ancestors of Roger A. Pryor

8. John Pryor
4. Richard Pryor
9. Anne Bland
2. Theodorick Bland Pryor
10. William Bland
5. Anne Bland
11. Elizabeth Yates
1. Roger Atkinson Pryor
12. Roger Atkinson, Sr.
6. Roger Atkinson, Jr.
3. Lucy Atkinson
14. Peter Poythress
7. Agnes Poythress

== See also ==
- List of American Civil War generals (Confederate)

== Notes ==
U.S. House of Representatives
Preceded by William Goode	Member of the U.S. House of Representatives from Virginia's 4th congressional district 1859–1861	Succeeded by George Booker^{(1)}
Confederate States House of Representatives
Preceded by Position established	Member of the Confederate States House of Representatives from Virginia's 4th congressional district 1862	Succeeded by Charles F. Collier
Notes and references
1. Because of Virginia's secession, the House seat was vacant for almost eleven years before Booker succeeded Pryor.
