= John C. Waugh =

American journalist and historian

- Born: October 12, 1929 (age 96); Biggs, California
- Education: University of Arizona; University of California, Los Angeles; St. Johns College
- Occupations: journalist historian
- Spouse: Kathleen Dianne Lively
- Children: Daniel Waugh; Daniel Waugh

John Clinton Waugh (born October 12, 1929) is an American journalist and historian.

Waugh began professional writing as a journalist, then turned to media work for national politicians, and began authoring books about history in 1989. He is best known for his first book, The Class of 1846 — From West Point to Appomattox: Stonewall Jackson, George McClellan and their Brothers, which won the New York Civil War Round Table's Fletcher Pratt Literary Award for the best non-fiction book of 1994 and was a best-seller. He is author of four books on Abraham Lincoln and eight other histories on topics relating to the American Civil War.

Waugh lives in Pantego, Texas.

== Early life, education and family ==
Waugh was born in Biggs, California in 1929.. He attended the University of Arizona, receiving a BA in 1951. He did post-graduate work in history and political science at UCLA and St. Johns College.

Waugh resides in North Texas with his wife, Kathleen Dianne Lively, a social work administrator. Their children are Daniel Waugh, a lawyer in Providence, Rhode Island, and Eliza Waugh, a teacher in Austin, Texas.

== Journalism career ==
Waugh was employed from 1956 to 1973 as a staff correspondent and bureau chief on The Christian Science Monitor. Honors included the American Bar Association’s 1972 Silver Gavel Award for the best national reporting for a series on American prisons.

He was a media specialist on the staff of Vice President Nelson Rockefeller from 1973 to 1976 and press secretary to Democratic Senator Jeff Bingaman of New Mexico from 1983 to 1988.

His contributions to periodicals include articles in Civil War History, American Heritage, Civil War Times Illustrated, Columbiad, The Washington Post Book World, The New York Times., The New Republic, The Nation, The Los Angeles Times Magazine, The Boston Globe, and The Boston Herald American.

He has been a consultant to organizations including the National Archives and Records Administration, the U.S. Department of Energy, the U.S. Environmental Protection Agency, the Atlantic Richfield Company, the President's Council on Environmental Quality, the Public Broadcasting Service (PBS), and West Virginia Public Radio. He has been a tour guide for HistoryAmerica Tours and Custom Travel Concepts.

== Awards and honors ==
- New York Civil War Round Table Fletcher Pratt Award for the best book of nonfiction on the Civil War published in 1994, for The Class of 1846.
- Daughters of the American Revolution History Award Medal, in recognition of contributions that significantly advance the understanding of our nation's past through the study and promotion of an aspect of American history – 1998.
- Grady McWhiney Award of Merit for significant contributions to the scholarship and preservation of Civil War history – 2000.
- Induction into the Texas Institute of Letters for outstanding contributions to literary Texas – 2011.
- Fort Worth Civil War Round Table Pate Distinguished Service Award in recognition of outstanding contributions to Civil War history – 2012.
- Houston Civil War Round Table Frank E. Vandiver Award of Merit – 2013.

== Published works ==
- The Class of 1846 — From West Point to Appomattox: Stonewall Jackson, George McClellan and their Brothers. Foreword by James M. McPherson.
  Synopsis: The story of the men of the West Point class of 1846, the most distinguished of the antebellum years — as cadets at the academy, field officers in the Mexican and Indian Wars, and generals in the Civil War. Warner Books, 1994. Cloth ISBN 0-446-51594-9. Ballantine Books, 1999. Paper ISBN 0-345-43403-X. Unabridged recording at RecordedBooks.com.
- Sam Bell Maxey and the Confederate Indians.
  Synopsis: The story of how a paleface West Pointer commanded the Confederate Indians in the last year of the Civil War. McWhiney Foundation Press, 1995. Paper: ISBN 1-886661-03-0.
- Reelecting Lincoln: The Battle for the 1864 Presidency.
  Synopsis: The dramatic story of the most unusual and one of the most important presidential elections in American history. Crown Publishers, 1997. Cloth ISBN 0-517-59766-7. DaCapo Press, 2001. Paper: ISBN 0-306-81022-0.
- Last Stand at Mobile.
  Synopsis: The story of the Union Navy under Admiral David Farragut ran past the blazing guns of Fort Morgan into Mobile Bay in August 1864 and how six months later the city fell to the Union army. McWhiney Foundation Press, 2001. Cloth: ISBN 1-893114-09-0. Paper: ISBN 1-893114-08-2.
- Surviving the Confederacy: Rebellion, Ruin, and Recovery — Roger and Sara Pryor During the Civil War.
  Synopsis: A prominent Confederate couple's experiences in the Civil War. Harcourt, 2002. Cloth: ISBN 0-15-100389-0.
- Edwin Cole Bearss: History’s Pied Piper.
  Synopsis: Biography of the colorful, celebrated American historian and Chief Historian Emeritus of the National Park Service. Published by HistoryAmerica TOURS, 2003. Paper: ISBN 0-9729827-0-1.
- On the Brink of Civil War: The Compromise of 1850 and How It Changed the Course of American History.
  Synopsis: How civil war was averted in 1850 when a compromise over slavery in the territories was hammered out in a contentious fight on the floor of the U.S. Senate. Scholarly Resources, 2003. Cloth: ISBN 0-8420-2944-3. Paper: ISBN 0-8420-2945-1.
- 20 Good Reasons to Study the Civil War. Foreword by Jim Lehrer.
  Synopsis: Twenty short essays on why the Civil War is important and warrants the study and attention of every American. McWhiney Foundation Press, 2004. Paper: ISBN 1-893114-46-5.
- One Man Great Enough: Abraham Lincoln’s Road to Civil War.
  Synopsis: How Abraham Lincoln, a frontier lawyer and politician, fought his rival, Stephen A. Douglas, in Illinois over the Union-splitting issue of slavery and rose to the presidency. Harcourt, 2007. Cloth: ISBN 978-0-15-101071-4. Unabridged recording at BlackstoneAudio.com.
- How Historians Work: Retelling the Past — from the Civil War to the Wider World.
  Synopsis: Profiles of 24 prominent historians, of many different disciplines, and how they practice their craft, from where they find their ideas to how they do their research and their writing. State House Press, 2010. Paperback: ISBN 978-1-933337-43-2.
- Lincoln and McClellan: The Troubled Partnership of a President and His General.
  Synopsis: An in-depth look at the relationship between this most dissimilar pair, from the early days of the Civil War to the 1864 presidential election when McClellan ran against Lincoln on an anti-war platform and lost. Palgrave MacMillan, 2010. Cloth: ISBN 978-0-230-61349-2.
- Lincoln and the War's End
  Synopsis: The story of the last five months of the Civil War covering key political and military events, centering on Lincoln's involvement in each — including his final message to Congress, passage of the 13th amendment, the 2nd Inaugural, and his visit to the seat of war in its closing days. Southern Illinois University Press, 2014. Cloth: ISBN 978-0-8093-3351-6. Cloth: ISBN 0-8093-3351-1. ebook: ISBN 978-0-8093-3352-3. ebook: ISBN 0-8093-3352-X.
- Unforgettables: Some Winners, Losers, Strong Women, and Eccentric Men of the Civil War Era. Savas Beatie, 2024. ISBN 9781611216653.
