= National Mary Washington Memorial Association =

Americans organization

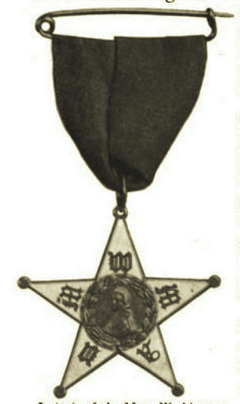
Insignia of the Association

National Mary Washington Memorial Association (NMWMA) is a hereditary American woman's organization created in Washington, D.C. in 1889, to support in perpetuity the monument to Mary Ball Washington located at Fredericksburg, Virginia. It is the second chartered historical and patriotic society among women in the United States. The monument is the first in the U.S. by women to honor a woman.

On February 22, 1890, the Association was chartered in the District of Columbia, for 1000 years. This organization, composed almost wholly of women and limited to 600 hereditary life members, received by gift the land that had been deeded to the Fredericksburg association and, with the active cooperation of the Daughters of the American Revolution, secured the money needed and built there a new monument and lodge, the title to which was vested in the President and the Chief Justice of the United States and the governor of Virginia, ex officio, as trustees.

Additional work, such as landscape setting including wall and planting, was done in 1939, by landscape architect, Alden S. Hopkins. Ornamental trees were planted in 1987. More recently, in 2008, paving and planting renovations were accomplished by the landscape architect, William D. Rieley.

The monument was vandalized in July 2025.

== Death of Mary Washington ==
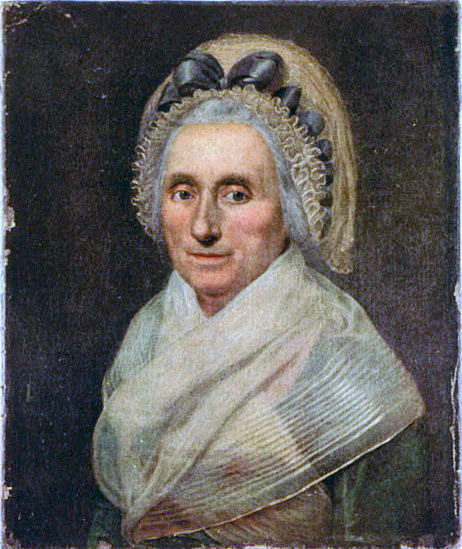
Mary Ball Washington

Mary Ball Washington died August 25, 1789, at Fredericksburg, Virginia. She was buried on August 28. All over the country, the mourning was general, press and churches made note of the event, and members of Congress wore mourning for thirty days. President George Washington wrote a note of thanks to Congress for the passing of a resolution to build a monument in memory of his mother. But the new government had more pressing duties than the building of monuments. When Lafayette visited the United States in 1825, nothing but a little headstone marked the grave of Mary Washington.

== First monument ==
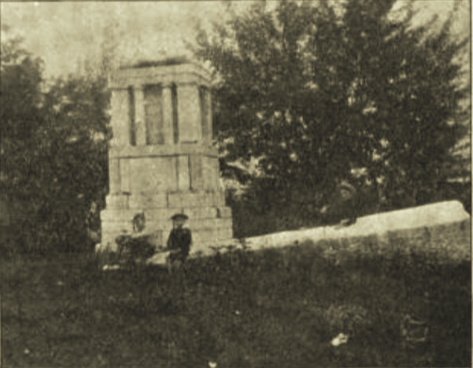
First monument

In 1831, the citizens of Fredericksburg had secured about US$2,000 for the building of a monument over the grave when Silas E. Burrows of New York asked "to be allowed the honor of individually erecting the monument." The generous offer was accepted and President Andrew Jackson laid the cornerstone on May 7, 1833. In the next four years, the monument's base with its small Doric columns was completed and the obelisk was on the ground ready to be lifted into place when the work was suddenly abandoned. After providing money for the completion of the work, Mr. Burrows went to China where he died; then the contractor died.

The first monument was never completed, its stones crumbled and fell, and around them, for four years, surged the American Civil War. From time to time, attempts were made to complete the monument or to build a new one. Two or three times, bills for that purpose passed the U.S. Senate and failed to pass the United States House of Representatives.

== Two associations ==
In the spring of 1889, "the grave of the Mother of Washington," at Fredericksburg, Virginia, was advertised in the newspapers: "For sale at auction to the highest bidder", by a distant real estate man who had made capital of Washington's tomb.

In June 1889, the NMWMA was organized in Washington, D.C. at the home of Amelia Champlin Warner Waite, wife of Chief Justice Morrison Waite, with attention being called to the state of the grave and monument of Washington's mother by the advertisement of a Fredericksburg, Virginia, auctioneer, who was to sell it to the highest bidder. At their first meeting, they appointed their officers: Amelia Waite, President, and Margaret Hetzel, whose dollar was the first in the National coffer, serving as a substantial support to her accompanying appeal to the Washington Post, suggesting that women should rear the long sought monument and that every woman able to do so should send US$1 toward it, The Post serving as treasurer. They also formulated their plan for the National Association, providing that a vice-president from each State be appointed. Further action was unexpectedly suspended on account of the "Johnstown Flood" during the month of June when the sympathies of the whole country were aroused on behalf of its sufferers. In the fall, however, work was resumed. A charter was obtained by the NMWMA on February 22, 1890.

The first meeting of the National Association, after incorporation, was held in the Green Room of the White House on May 13, 1891, It was attended by some of the most distinguished women at the capital. There, they organized the National Association to rescue the grave and complete the unfinished monument, if practicable, or erect a new one. Among Hetzel's early acts on its behalf was a resolution before the DAR, when in the fall of 1890 they actually organized, to secure the aid and interest of this body, and her resolution was unanimously carried. Hereditary life memberships in the National Society, on the payment of US$25, were suggested by Mrs. Roger A. Pryor, of Virginia, and until February 1896, such members would be welcomed.

At the same time, the people of Fredericksburg were seized with horror and indignation. The women of Fredericksburg reviewed the situation, and in October 1889, organized their society, which was chartered November 16, 1889. Slowly, the work progressed, until the Fredericksburg association had about US$5,000, the ruins of the old monument, and more than 5 acres (2.0 ha) of ground. Two citizens of Fredericksburg presented the local association with two lots and the third was bought by the local association with the proceeds of a local appeal of another citizen. Late in 1889, Mr. McDowell, in a letter to the Fredericksburg Association, wrote asking if it would not be a good idea "For your ladies to incorporate as the Virginia Society of the Daughters of the American Revolution and your gentlemen as the Virginia Society of the Sons of the American Revolution, and that the Ladies' Society, in connection with like societies in every State in the Union, take up the general work as planned in the original Mary Washington Association,' that is now represented by Col. Ball." Mrs. James P. Smith was the first President of the Fredericksburg association, and on her resignation, upon removing to another city, Mrs. V. M. Fleming was appointed in her place. These Fredericksburg women, with the efficient aid given them by the Rev. James P. Smith, through purchase, gift, and otherwise, obtained possession, not only of Washington's grave but of the three adjoining lots. Mrs. James H. Thompson, the secretary of the Fredericksburg association, wrote: "We shall spare no effort to secure an enduring monument as beautiful as art can make. The city of Fredericksburg will make it the center of a public square, with wide avenues of approach, so that the American people may come and see that republics are not ungrateful. This will be a monument to a woman erected by women."

A few months later, negotiations between the Fredericksburg and the National Associations were entered into. A deed of the property of the Fredericksburg association was given to the National Association conditioned upon the National Association erecting, within a given time, "a suitable monument to Mary, the mother of Washington," and to erect said monument at Fredericksburg upon the spot selected by herself". In February 1891, all rights of the former were formally ceded to the National Association, including Washington's grave, the three adjoining lots, and US$1,000 toward the monument fund.

== New monument and grounds ==
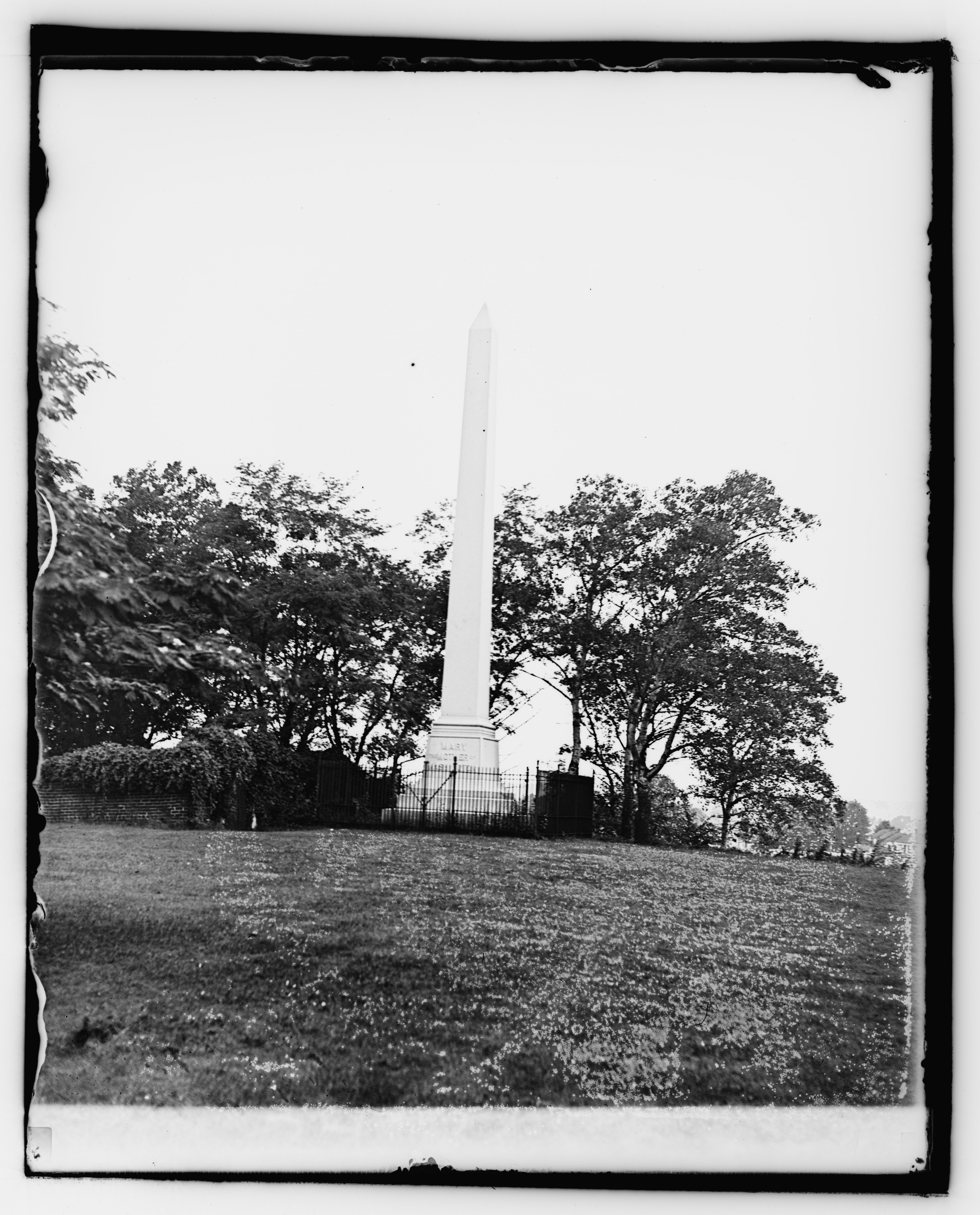
Statue to Mary Washington (Fredericksburg, Virginia, 1920)

The old monument was found to be an irreparable ruin, and the National Association hired William J. Crawford as the builder of the new monument.

The cornerstone for a new monument was laid on October 21, 1893, and on May 10, 1894, the new monument was dedicated with Masonic ceremonies and in the presence of the U.S. President and other distinguished guests.

It is an obelisk of Barre granite, 50 feet (15 m) in height, of classic form and proportions. Upon the plinth are the words, "Mary, the Mother of Washington"; on the reverse side, "Erected by her Countrywomen".

A lodge was built at the entrance of the grounds and a Fredericksburg woman from a distinguished family was made the custodian. The grounds were enclosed and laid out. Willows from Mount Vernon were planted near the Monument by the last daughter of the George Washington family born at Mount Vernon, who was the First Vice-president of the Mary Washington Association.

== Perpetuity ==
On May 10, 1894, President Grover Cleveland, Vice President Adlai Stevenson I, and nearly the whole Cabinet came to Fredericksburg and honored the unveiling of the new monument. The governor of Virginia and many Senators and Congressmen from both sides also attended. The ceremony included Christian prayer, Masonic ritual, and oratories.

After the Association fulfilled its aim to erect a suitable monument at the grave of Mary Washington, it has existed in perpetual care of the ground and monument. It is to be the privilege of future descendants of the present members to care for this historic spot.

Mary Frances Waite was elected president soon after her mother's death.

The payment of US$25 by one person at the same time entitled the person so paying to a Hereditary Life Membership in the Association, the certificate of which was a silver medal in the form of a star with the head of Mary, the mother of Washington, in the center, the initials of the Association (N.M.W.M.A.) in blue and white enamel upon the five points on the obverse side, and the Washington Heraldic colors on the reverse side. Those giving US$35 received a gold medal. This Association being organized for perpetuity, these Life Members, and their successors by inheritance, were privileged to aid in caring for the protection and preservation of the grave and monument of the mother of Washington for all future time. These medals are as an inheritance to descend from mother to daughter or granddaughter, and so on in the direct female line, or failing these, by will or deed, and entitle the inheritor to a vote at all meetings of the Association.

In March 1894, the secretary of the NMWMA sent out an appeal to the Chapters of the DAR throughout the country, asking for aid in completing their work with the creation of an endowment. On the Board of Lady Managers of the NMWMA, the president, the two vice-presidents, and the secretary were all charter members of the DAR. The Association was desirous of collecting sufficient funds before February 22, 1895.

No medals were given out after February 22, 1896.

== Legacy ==
The Building of a Monument was written by Susan Riviere Hetzel, and published in 1903. She was at the time Secretary of the National Association, following her mother Margaret Hetzel, its first Secretary.
