= Andrew O. Apple =

- Born: January 30, 1845; Northampton, Pennsylvania, US
- Died: June 7, 1890 (aged 45); Elgin, Illinois, US
- Military career
- Allegiance: United States of America
- Branch: United States Army (Union Army)
- Rank: Corporal
- Nickname: Andy
- Units: 12th Regiment West Virginia Volunteer Infantry, Company I
- Conflicts: American Civil War; Second Battle of Winchester; Valley Campaigns of 1864; Battle of New Market; Battle of Lynchburg; Battle of Snicker's Ferry; Second Battle of Kernstown; Battle of Berryville; Battle of Opequon; Battle of Fisher's Hill; Richmond-Petersburg campaign; Third Battle of Petersburg; Appomattox campaign; Battle of Rice's Station; Battle of Appomattox Court House; Surrender at Appomattox
- Awards: Medal of Honor

Andrew O. Apple (January 30, 1845 – June 7, 1890) was a United States soldier and native of Pennsylvania who fought with the Union Army as a member of the 12th West Virginia Volunteer Infantry Regiment during the American Civil War. He was recognized with his nation's highest award for valor, the Medal of Honor, for "conspicuous gallantry as color bearer in the assault on Fort Gregg" during the Third Battle of Petersburg, Virginia, on April 2, 1865. The award was conferred on May 12 of that same year.

== Formative years ==
Born on January 30, 1845, at Northampton, Pennsylvania, Andrew O. Apple was a son of Pennsylvania natives David and Matilda Apple. In 1850, he resided in Easton, Northampton County, where his father was employed as a distiller. Also residing at the home with Andrew and his parents were siblings: Theodore, George, Elizabeth, and William (born, respectively, circa 1841, 1843, 1846, and 1849). By 1860, Andrew Apple was residing in New Cumberland, Hancock County, Virginia, with his parents and siblings: Theodore, George, Elizabeth, Barbara and Oliver (born, respectively, circa 1854 and 1855), Ward Beecher (1855-1913), and Myrta (born circa 1859). His father supported their large family on the wages of a miller.

== Civil War ==
Apple fought for the Union Army during the American Civil War. After enrolling at the age of 17 at New Cumberland, West Virginia, on in August 1862, he then officially mustered in as a private with Company I of the 12th West Virginia Infantry, he was promoted to the rank of corporal sometime before April 1865.

His regiment fought in multiple small skirmishes and major military engagements throughout the war, including the Second Battle of Winchester (June 13–15, 1863); expedition from Martinsburg to New Market, Virginia, under Major-General Franz Sigel (April 30-May 16) during the opening days of the Union Army's Valley Campaigns of 1864, including the Battle of New Market (May 15); Major-General David Hunter's expedition to Lynchburg, including the Battle of Lynchburg (June 17–18); and the battles of Snicker's Ferry/Cool Spring (July 17–18) and Kernstown II (July 23–24). Engaged in Sheridan's Shenandoah Valley Campaign from August 6-November 28, the 12th West Virginia Infantry then participated in the battles at Strasburg (August 17), Berryville (September 3), Opequon/Third Winchester (guarding trains, September 19) and Fisher's Hill (guarding trains, September 22). Ordered to Bermuda Hundred in late December, the regiment was then assigned to trench duties in the Richmond-Petersburg Campaign until March 1865. Engaged next in the war-ending Appomattox Campaign (March 28–April 9), the regiment participated in operations at Petersburg (March 28–29) and Hatcher's Run (March 30–April 1).

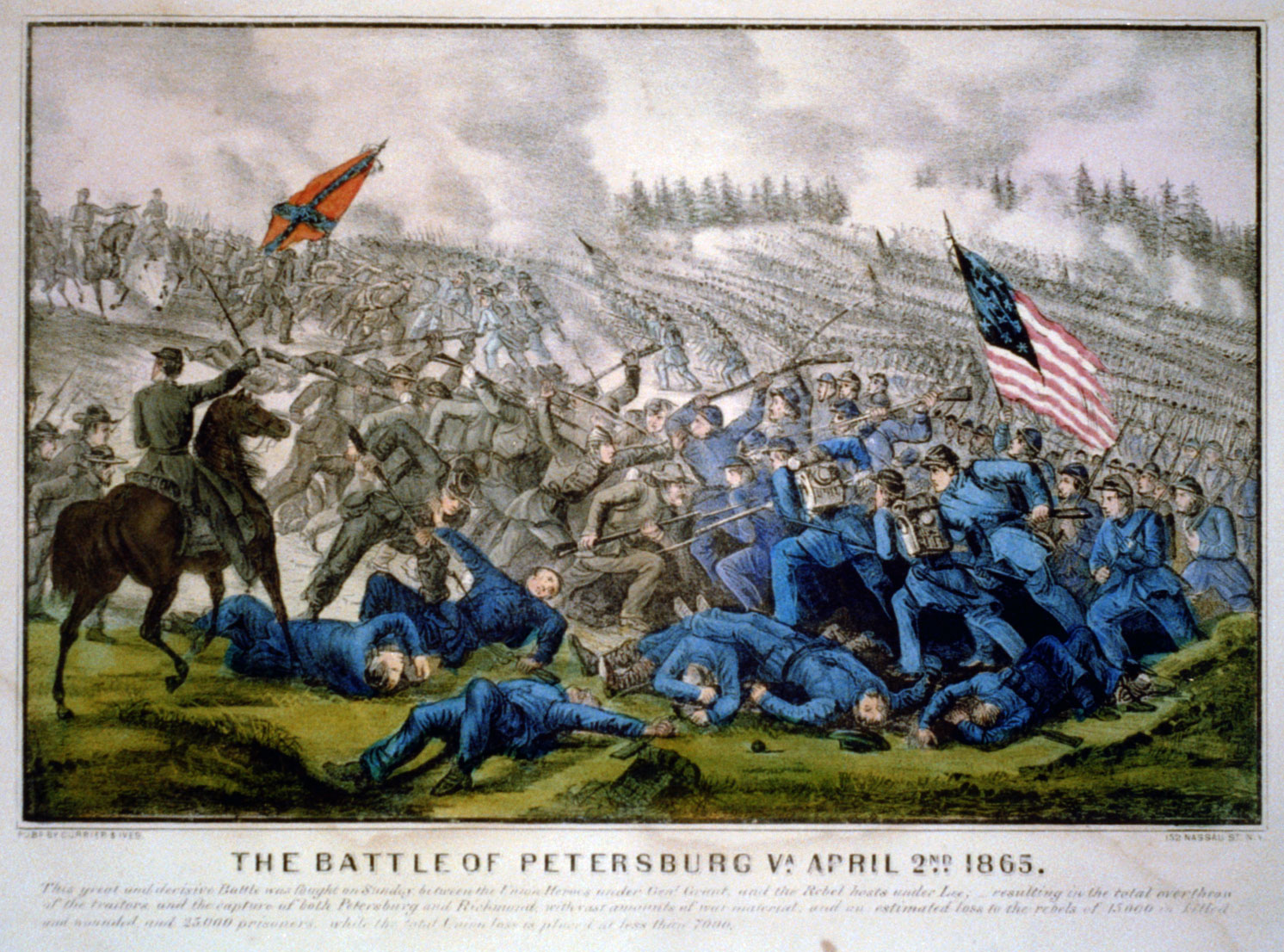
Third Battle of Petersburg, Virginia, April 2, 1865

On April 2, 1865, while fighting with his regiment in the Third Battle of Petersburg, Apple performed the act of conspicuous gallantry which later resulted in his being awarded the U.S. Medal of Honor. Apple retrieved his regiment's battle flag from a fallen comrade during the assault on Fort Gregg after two other members of his regiment had been killed carrying the flag in that day's engagement with Confederate troops. Interviewed later in life about his Civil War experiences, Apple described how the events unfolded that day:

... about noon April 2, 1865, while the operations were being carried on in front of Petersburg, after the works of Forts Gregg and Whitworth had been assaulted for six hours, General Ord attacked Fort Gregg with three brigades. We came from the left of the line and took the fort after a terrific struggle, during which there was no time to reload our muskets after first discharging them, and the greater number of us were forced to use our bayonets during the entire assault.

Afterward, Apple's regiment participated in the pursuit of the Confederate troops commanded by General Robert E. Lee (April 3–9), including the battles of Rice's Station (April 6) and Appomattox Court House (April 9), and the surrender of Lee and his army at Appomattox. Marched to Lynchburg and stationed there through April 15, Apple's regiment then marched to Farmville, Burkesville Junction (April 15–19) and, beginning April 22, to Richmond, where they remained through mid-June.

Apple, however, was not given the same rest period. Singled out as one of 40 men to be placed on detached duty in May, he and the other group members were ordered to board a steamer, and placed in charge of guarding a series of boxes which they initially were told contained guns. Upon their arrival in Washington, D.C., they oversaw the transport of those boxes to the White House where, in front of U.S. Secretary of War Edwin Stanton and other members of President Johnson's cabinet, the boxes were opened to reveal the battle flags which had been taken from Lee's Confederate forces. After being photographed with Stanton, the men were each given two months' pay and a 30-day furlough with transportation to their homes and back to camp. Upon his return to Richmond, Apple was presented with his Medal of Honor (see "Medal of Honor citation" below), and was then honorably discharged with his regiment on June 16, 1865.

== Post-war life ==
Following his honorable discharge from the military, Apple returned home to Pennsylvania. In 1868, he moved west in search of a better life. Choosing to settle in Illinois in 1868, he lived and worked as a bartender at the hotel operated by Joseph Pabst (1830–1913) and Johanna (Henneman) Pabst (1831–1886) in Elgin, Illinois, and it was here that he met his future wife — the Pabst's daughter, Mary (1854–1928), a native of Chicago. They were married in Kane County, Illinois, on November 2, 1869. Their children were: Anna May (1871–1941), Joseph (1873-1930), Clarence Charles (1882–1903), George Oliver (1877-1906), Clara (born in 1880-1902), and Viola (1886-1949).

During the mid-1870s he embarked on a career as a fireman. After joining the Excelsior Hose Company on July 7, 1875, he then joined his city's fire department two years later on April 28. The next year (1878), he was appointed as the city's second assistant fire marshall. Appointed as the city's first assistant fire marshall in 1879, he served in that capacity until being awarded the post of city fire marshall in Elgin on May 14, 1889, a position he continued to hold for the remainder of his life.

Friends and family referred to Apple by his nickname, "Andy". A member of Elgin's First Congregational Church, he was also active with his local chapter of the Grand Army of the Republic, serving as Officer of the Day for post number 49 from 1885-1886 and in 1889.

== Illness, death and interment ==
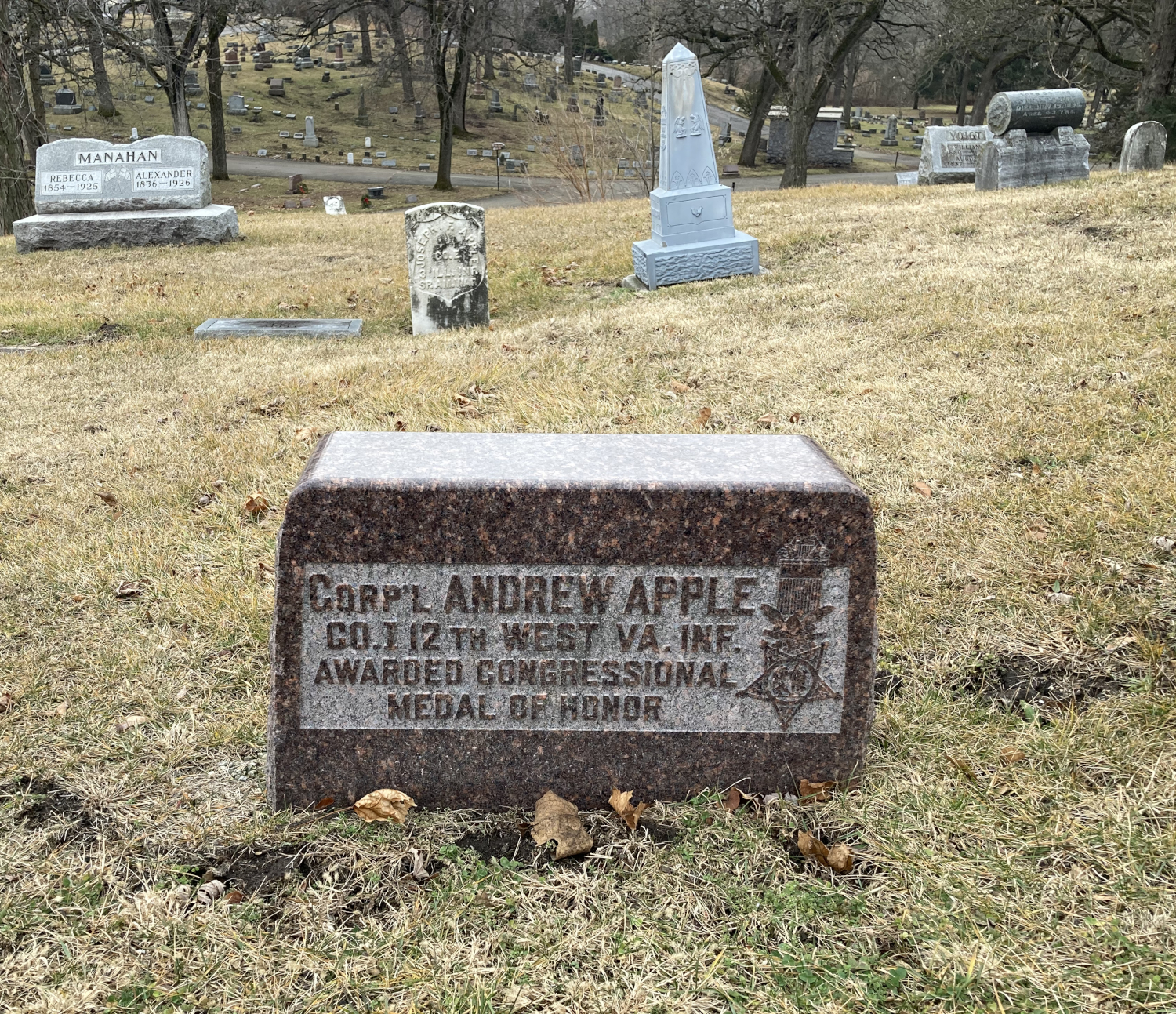
Apple's grave at Bluff City Cemetery

Sometime during his early to mid-40s, Apple developed Bright's Disease, a chronic inflammation of the kidneys. He died at his home in Elgin on June 7, 1890, at the age of 45 from complications related to that disease. Following funeral services at the First Congregational Church in Elgin, the hearse carrying his remains was escorted to his gravesite by comrades from his G.A.R. post, members of the fire department and other city officials. He was then buried in Elgin's Bluff City Cemetery.

== Medal of Honor citation ==
Apple was awarded the U.S. Medal of Honor for his actions during the Third Battle of Petersburg, Virginia, on April 2, 1865. Award Issue Date: May 12, 1865. Citation:

The President of the United States of America, in the name of Congress, takes pleasure in presenting the Medal of Honor to Corporal Andrew O. Apple, United States Army, for extraordinary heroism on April 2, 1865, while serving with Company I, 12th West Virginia Infantry, in action at Petersburg, Virginia, for conspicuous gallantry as Color Bearer in the assault on Fort Gregg.

When interviewed in January 1890 about his being given the Medal of Honor, Apple described how the award presentation and subsequent events unfolded in May 1865:

The first I knew that I had done anything out of the ordinary line was, one morning while we were in camp at Richmond, after coming from the scene of Lee's surrender, the orderly sergeant stopped at my tent and asked if I wanted to go home.

I told him that we would all go so soon that I had better wait for the regiment.... [T]here was an intense satisfaction in being inside the city which had so long resisted our efforts.

Instead of being content with my answer, the sergeant told me to fix up and report to regimental headquarters. I had but little choice as to the clothes I should wear, and at best looked more like a tramp than a respectable soldier. We had not drawn any garments for three months, and I was ragged, dirty, and with shoes that would have disgraced an ash barrel.

The orders had to be obeyed, however, regardless of personal appearance, and on reporting I found a lieutenant and one private waiting for me. We three were then told to go to brigade headquarters, where were two men from the 23rd Illinois and one from the 116th Ohio.

From here we were sent to the corps commander, and he in turn ordered us to the landing, where about forty had gathered, none of whom knew any more about their reason for being there than I did.

A steamer was tied up to the bank.... We lounged around a long while ... and finally the order came for us to go on board as guard to the boxes. The steamer was bound for Washington, and on arriving there we were to escort the freight to the White House.

Even then none of our party realized what it was that we were to take such wonderful care of, and not until the cases had been opened in our presence before all the cabinet members did we learn that they contained General Lee's battle flags.... [W]e were placed in front of a camera, and then Secretary of War Stanton gave us the freedom of the city, two months' pay, a furlough of thirty days, together with free transportation to our homes and back....

I enjoyed every one of the thirty days, and went back to the front believing that I had been amply awarded for all that had been done in the assault on Fort Gregg, but ... the full payment for that day's work had not been made.

We went into camp like schoolboys who had earned an unexpected holiday, and without the slightest idea that anything more was to follow ... the whole corps was drawn up in a hollow square [at their camp in Richmond], and the name of each member of the furloughed party was called in turn.

As we stepped forward, General Ord's daughter came up and pinned a Congressional medal of honor on the breast of each one, and for the first time we understood that the country had decorated us with the highest possible gift as a reward for bravery.... It is not necessary to speak of the pride I felt at being singled out from so many brave fellows. If I had earned it unwittingly, it was none the less precious, and I value it more highly than words can tell.

== See also ==
- List of American Civil War Medal of Honor recipients: A–F
- Pennsylvania in the American Civil War
