= James R. Durham =

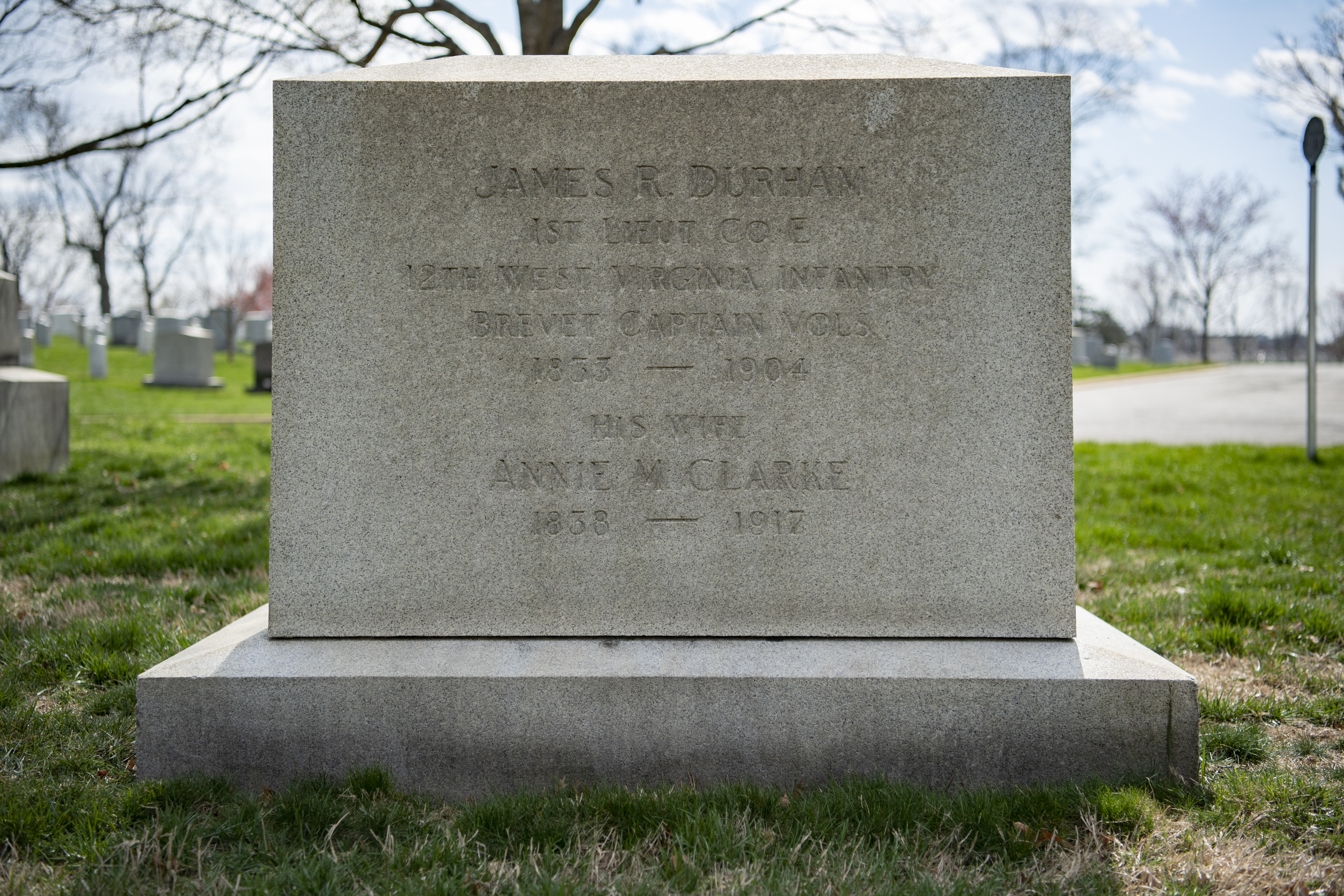
- Grave at Arlington National Cemetery
- Born: February 7, 1833; Richmond, Virginia, U.S.
- Died: August 6, 1904 (aged 71); Washington, D.C., U.S.
- Burial place: Arlington National Cemetery
- Military career
- Allegiance: United States
- Branch: United States Army; Union Army
- Rank: First Lieutenant
- Unit: 12th West Virginia Volunteer Infantry Regiment
- Conflicts: American Civil War • Second Battle of Winchester
- Awards: Medal of Honor

James R. Durham (February 7, 1833 – August 6, 1904) was a Union Army officer during the American Civil War. He received the Medal of Honor for gallantry during the Second Battle of Winchester, Virginia on June 14, 1863.

== Medal of Honor citation ==
"The President of the United States of America, in the name of Congress, takes pleasure in presenting the Medal of Honor to Second Lieutenant James R. Durham, United States Army, for extraordinary heroism on 14 June 1863, while serving with Company E, 12th West Virginia Infantry, in action at Winchester, Virginia. Second Lieutenant Durham led his command over the stone wall, where he was wounded."

== See also ==
- List of Medal of Honor recipients for the Battle of Gettysburg
- List of American Civil War Medal of Honor recipients: A–F
