= 122nd Ohio Infantry Regiment =

- Active: September 30, 1862, to June 26, 1865
- Country: United States
- Allegiance: Union
- Branch: Infantry
- Engagements: Second Battle of Winchester; New York Draft Riots; Bristoe Campaign; Mine Run Campaign; Battle of the Wilderness; Battle of Spotsylvania Court House; Battle of Totopotomoy Creek; Battle of Cold Harbor; Battle of Monocacy (detachment); Shenandoah Valley Campaign; Third Battle of Winchester; Battle of Cedar Creek; Siege of Petersburg; Appomattox Campaign; Battle of Sayler's Creek

The 122nd Ohio Infantry Regiment, sometimes 122nd Ohio Volunteer Infantry (or 122nd OVI) was an infantry regiment in the Union Army during the American Civil War.

== Service ==
The 122nd Ohio Infantry was organized at Zanesville, Ohio, and mustered in for three years service on September 30, 1862, under the command of Colonel William H. Ball. (Company C mustered in October 3, Company G mustered in October 5, Company F mustered in October 6, and Companies I and K mustered on October 8, 1862.)

The regiment was attached to Railroad Division, Western Virginia, to January 1863. Milroy's Command, Winchester, Va., VIII Corps, Middle Department, to February 1863. 1st Brigade, 2nd Division, VIII Corps, to June 1863. Elliott's Command, VIII Corps, to July 1863. 2nd Brigade, 3rd Division, III Corps, Army of the Potomac, to March 1864. 2nd Brigade, 3rd Division, VI Corps, Army of the Potomac, and Army of the Shenandoah, Middle Military Division, to June 1865.

The 122nd Ohio Infantry mustered out of service at Washington, D.C., on June 26, 1865.

== Detailed service ==
- Left Ohio for Parkersburg, Va., October 23; thence moved to Clarksburg and to New Creek November 15.
- Duty at New Creek, Va., November 15 to December 28, 1862.
- Expedition up the south branch of Potomac River December 28, 1862, to January 1, 1863.
- Moved to Romney, Va., and duty there until March 17, 1863.
- Skirmish near Romney February 16.
- Moved to Winchester March 17, and duty in that vicinity until June.
- Reconnaissance toward Wardensville and Strasburg April 20.
- Battle of Winchester June 13–15.
- Retreat to Harper's Ferry June 15–17.
- Garrison, Maryland Heights, until July 1.
- Guard stores to Georgetown, thence moved to Frederick, Md., July 1–5.
- Pursuit of Lee to Manassas Gap, Va., July 5–24.
- Action at Wapping Heights, Va., July 23.
- Duty at New York City during draft disturbances August 17 – September 5.
- Bristoe Campaign October 9–22.
- Advance to line of the Rappahannock November 7–8.
- Kelly's Ford November 7.
- Brandy Station November 8.
- Mine Run Campaign November 26 – December 2.
- Payne's Farm November 27.
- Demonstrations on the Rapidan February 6–7, 1864.
- Campaign from the Rapidan to the James River May 3 – June 15.
- Battles of the Wilderness May 5–7; Spottsylvania May 8–12; Spottsylvania Court House May 12–21.
- Assault on the Salient, "Bloody Angle," May 12.
- North Anna River May 23–26.
- On line of the Pamunkey May 26–28.
- Totopotomoy May 28–31.
- Cold Harbor June 1–12.
- Before Petersburg June 17-July 6.
- Jerusalem Plank Road June 22–23.
- Moved to Baltimore, Md., July 6; thence to Monocacy July 8.
- Battle of Monocacy Junction, Md., July 9.
- Sheridan's Shenandoah Valley Campaign August 7 – November 29.
- Charlestown August 21, 22 and 29.
- Battle of Opequan, Winchester, September 19.
- Fisher's Hill September 22. Battle of Cedar Creek October 19.
- Duty at Kernstown until December.
- Skirmish at Kernstown November 10.
- Moved to Washington, D.C., December 3; thence to Petersburg, Va.
- Siege of Petersburg, Va., December 6, 1864, to April 2, 1865.
- Appomattox Campaign March 28 – April 9, 1865.
- Assault on and fall of Petersburg April 2.
- Pursuit of Lee April 3–9. Sayler's Creek April 6.
- Appomattox Court House April 9.
- Surrender of Lee and his army.
- March to Danville April 17–27, and duty there until May.
- Moved to Richmond, Va., May 16; thence to Washington, D.C., May 24 – June 1.
- Corps Review June 9.

== Casualties ==
The regiment lost a total of 230 men during service; 7 officers and 86 enlisted men killed or mortally wounded, 137 enlisted men died of disease.

== Commanders ==
- Colonel William H. Ball
- Lieutenant Colonel Moses M. Granger - commanded at the Second Battle of Winchester
- Captain Charles J. Gibeaut - commander of Company E - killed by a bullet wound to the head at the Second Battle of Winchester

== Notable members ==
- Private George A. Loyd, Company A - Medal of Honor recipient for action at Petersburg
- Chaplain Charles Caldwell McCabe - Chancellor of American University, 1902–1906; bishop of the Methodist Episcopal Church
- Principal Musician John T. Patterson - Medal of Honor recipient for action at the battle of Opequan
- Private Elbridge Robinson, Company C - Medal of Honor recipient for action at the battle of Opequan

== See also ==
- List of Ohio Civil War units
- Ohio in the Civil War
