= Fourth Corps, Army of Northern Virginia =

- Confederate battle flag
- Active: October 19, 1864– April 8, 1865
- Country: Confederate States of America
- Allegiance: Virginia
- Branch: Confederate States Army
- Type: Army Corps
- Role: infantry tactics, trench warfare
- Size: 2-3 divisions, 9-13 brigades
- Part of: Army of Northern Virginia
- Nickname(s): Anderson's Corps
- Engagements: American Civil War: Richmond-Petersburg Campaign; Siege of Petersburg; Appomattox Campaign

Commanders
- Notable commanders: Richard Anderson

The Fourth Corps was a military unit formed in October 1864 within the Army of Northern Virginia of the Confederate Army. It fought for the Confederate States of America during the late stages of the American Civil War. The corps was commanded by Richard H. Anderson during its short life and was combined with the Second Corps shortly before Lee's surrender on April 9, 1865.

== 1864 ==
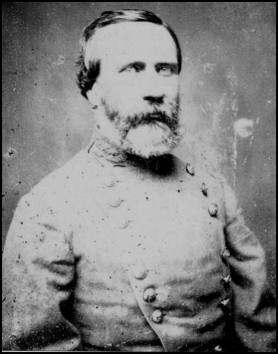
Lt. Gen. Richard Anderson

With the recovery of Lt. General James Longstreet from injury, which allowed him to resume leading the First Corps, a new Fourth Corps was created on October 19, 1864. Commanded by temporary Lt. General Anderson, it was made up of units that before had served around Richmond and Petersburg as part of General Beauregard's Department of North Carolina and Southern Virginia.

== 1865 ==
The Fourth Corps spent the winter of 1864/5 encamped around Petersburg as part of the Army of Northern Virginia. In April, the Army of the Potomac, under General Ulysses Grant, broke through the defenses and successfully concluded the siege of Petersburg, initiating the start of the Appomattox Campaign. The Fourth Corps retreated with the rest of General Lee's Army but was largely destroyed in the Battle of Sailor's Creek, during which several key officers were captured. The survivors were surrendered three days later, on 9 April 1865, at Appomattox Courthouse.

== See also ==
- First Corps, Army of Northern Virginia
- Second Corps, Army of Northern Virginia
- Third Corps, Army of Northern Virginia
- Cavalry Corps, Army of Northern Virginia
