= William J. Carson (Medal of Honor) =

American soldier (1840–1913)

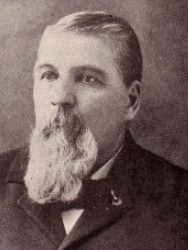
- William J. Carson
- Born: August 30, 1840; Washington County, Pennsylvania, U.S.
- Died: December 13, 1913 (aged 73); Muncie, Indiana, U.S.
- Military career
- Allegiance: United States
- Branch: United States Army
- Service years: 1861–1864
- Rank: Musician
- Units: 15th Regiment, U.S. Infantry 1st Battalion, Company E
- Conflicts: American Civil War
- Awards: Medal of Honor

William J. Carson (August 30, 1840 – December 13, 1913) was a United States Army soldier and recipient of the United States' highest military decoration, the Medal of Honor, for his actions at the Battle of Chickamauga in the American Civil War.

Carson, a bugler and private in the 15th United States Infantry Regiment of the United States Regular Army, helped rally a detachment of the Regular Army Brigade (Regular Brigade) of the Union Army of the Cumberland to hold an advanced position for a critical period of time at the Battle of Stones River on December 31, 1862. The forward regiments held off a large Confederate attack long enough to permit the Union forces which were withdrawing elsewhere on the battlefield to regroup and hold critical defensive lines protecting their supply line and route of retreat over the Nashville turnpike and a railroad line. The forward regiments ultimately had to withdraw in haste in the face of superior force but then held key fallback defensive positions and held the field at the end of the battle. While in the retreat across an open field and under fire, Carson helped a wounded comrade from the battlefield, saving him from probable death on the field or capture.

On both days of the Battle of Chickamauga, on his own initiative, Carson played a key role in rallying Union troops under heavy attack near the end of the Union line. These actions delayed further Confederate attacks long enough on the first day for the broken Union regiments to regroup and hold their ground. On the second day of the battle, the extra time gained by the troops rallied by Carson's actions allowed most of the Union Army to retreat to the defenses of Chattanooga, Tennessee, without pursuit by the Confederate soldiers. Carson's actions rallied the troops and gave the impression that a large number of Union reinforcements were arriving. Renewed Confederate assaults were delayed so the Confederates could mass their forces against the supposed reinforced Union line. This delay allowed most of the Union Army on the field, including most of the XIV Corps to which the regulars were assigned, to retreat to a more secure position at Chattanooga. The small remaining rear guard force, including Carson, held the Union line for three additional critical hours until most of the remaining defenders ran out of ammunition and were taken prisoner.

== Early life ==
William J. Carson was born in Westmoreland County, Pennsylvania, on August 30, 1840. In 1845, his parents moved to Washington County, Ohio, and in 1852 they again moved to Logan County, Ohio, near Bellefontaine, the county seat. William worked on the family farm in spring, summer, and early autumn, and attended the district school in winter. He was at Bellefontaine when the American Civil War began.

On September 2, 1861, Carson enlisted in the 15th United States Infantry Regiment, and was assigned to Company "E", 1st Battalion, under the command of Captain Henry Keteltas.

== American Civil War service ==
William J. Carson participated with his regiment in all of its Civil War battles from the Battle of Shiloh (Pittsburgh Landing) on April 7, 1862, to the Battle of Chickamauga (Chickamauga, Georgia) on September 19 and 20, 1863 after which he was taken prisoner. Carson was a bugler but he picked up a rifle and joined in the fighting if needed. His distinguished record earned him a high amount of praise from officers and fellow soldiers and eventually the Medal of Honor for his gallantry at the Battle of Chickamauga.

=== Battle of Shiloh and beyond ===
The 1st Battalion of the 15th U.S. Infantry Regiment was ordered to join then Brigadier General Ulysses S. Grant for the Battle of Fort Donelson but the fort was captured before the battalion could join Grant. The battalion then went to Nashville, Tennessee where it was assigned to the brigade of Brigadier General Lovell H. Rousseau, in the division of Major General Alexander McCook, in the first Army of the Ohio. The division moved south to join Grant but arrived the night after the first day of the Battle of Shiloh. The 1st Battalion, 15th United States Infantry Regiment fought on the second day of the Battle of Shiloh, April 7, 1862. Along with the rest of the division, the battalion routed a Confederate division in a conspicuous charge. Company E commander Captain Henry Keteltas, three other officers and fifty-five men were wounded along with the four regulars killed in the action. After Shiloh, the regulars participated in the Siege of Corinth. They spent the remainder of the year marching and maneuvering through Mississippi, Alabama, Tennessee and Kentucky before returning to Nashville in November 1862.

=== Battle of Stones River ===
Soon after Major General William S. Rosecrans assumed command of the first Union Army of the Ohio and changed its name to the Army of the Cumberland on October 24, 1862, he took steps to increase the number of men in the four Regular Army regiments (Carson's 15th, and the 16th, 18th and 19th U. S. Infantry Regiments) under his command to their authorized strength and to place them in a single "Regular Brigade." The brigade was formed on December 18, 1862, and placed under the command of Lieutenant Colonel Oliver Shepherd of the 18th United States Infantry Regiment in the division of Brigadier General Lovell H. Rousseau and the center corps or wing of Major General George H. Thomas. The Regular Brigade was designated 4th Brigade, 3rd Division, Center (wing or corps). On December 25, 1862, the Regular Brigade had five battalions with a total of forty-three companies. On the next day, Rosecrans began to march his force from his base at Nashville toward Murfreesboro, Tennessee, where he intended to strike the Confederate Army of Tennessee commanded by General Braxton Bragg.

On the first day of the Battle of Stones River near Murfreesboro, December 31, 1862, Rosecrans and Bragg both intended to attack their opponent's right wing. The Confederates attacked first and drove back Major General Alexander McCook's right wing. Rousseau's division was Rosecrans's only reserve but he had to use them in the battle to stop the Union retreat on his right. Rousseau's forces formed to the right of Brigadier General Philip H. Sheridan's division which was holding the right side of the line while men of the units in retreat passed by. Captain Keteltas's E Company, 1st Battalion, 15th U.S. Infantry Regiment was in an advanced position across a cotton field and in front of isolated cedar trees and deployed as skirmishers while the rest of the regiment was back in the trees. Bugler William J. Carson later wrote that the skirmishers fell back to the trees in the face of an overwhelming Confederate attack. After holding for about 20 minutes, the regulars began to fall back quickly but with some of the men firing as they went. After the men had gone back about 100 yards, Keteltas ordered Carson to sound the rally. With this bugle call, many of the men turned and began to return the Confederate fire. At this time, Carson's cousin, Private William B. McCall, was killed.

The strong Confederate attack finally forced the regulars to withdraw from the woods toward the rear of their original position near a railroad line and the Nashville pike. Carson later wrote that the advancing Confederate poured several volleys into the retreating regulars. The regulars rallied around a knoll and behind a 10-gun battery, five guns each of the 5th U.S. Artillery and the 1st Michigan Artillery. "On they came like so many deamonds," (sic) wrote Carson. Then he described how the Union guns decimated the charging Confederates and forced their survivors to retreat. The 15th U.S. Infantry suffered 50 casualties among its 319 officers and men. Soon, the regulars realized they were being flanked on the left. Lt. Colonel Shepherd sent his men toward the crucial Nashville turnpike to meet the Confederate advance. The Confederates came on in great number. After sending two regiments to their aid, but realizing their position was about to be surrounded, Brigadier General Rousseau ordered the regulars to retreat. Finally, and only after their officers themselves recognized the danger, the Regular Brigade had to retreat across the open cotton field to the railroad line and the cover of their batteries on another nearby knoll as the Confederates again advanced in large numbers. The regulars suffered many casualties as they retreated across the open field with the pursuing Confederates firing on them as they ran toward their objective.

Carson was under fire and about halfway across the open cotton field during this withdrawal when he saw John Argo of his regiment wounded in both thighs. Carson lifted Argo from the ground and helped him escape across the remainder of the field, which saved Argo from possible death from his wounds or capture by the advancing Confederates.

The battle wound down and was broken off due to the cold, rainy weather and the exhaustion of the men but the two armies stayed in position on the battlefield. Bragg finally decided to withdraw from the field on January 3, 1863, because he feared Rosecrans was being reinforced. Rosecrans's force, including the regulars, were too exhausted to pursue the retreating Confederates, and also were hindered because the Confederates captured or destroyed much of the Union Army's food.

The next day, the regulars buried five officers and eighty-nine men of their brigade. Several others died later. Although a tactical draw, the Battle of Stones River was considered a victory by the North and the regulars were highly praised for their part in the battle. The stand of the regulars in the advanced position of the cedar grove enabled Rosecrans to strengthen his line along the Nashville Pike and save his supply line and his army. Carson had contributed to this by his actions in rallying the advanced units. He also demonstrated his courage in performing his job under precarious conditions and in rescuing one of his wounded comrades under fire and protecting him from death or capture.

=== Tullahoma campaign ===
In early 1863, new companies and replacement troops increased the Regular Brigade to 2,000 soldiers, more men than the number that the brigade had at the Battle of Stones River. In April, Rosecrans relieved Colonel Oliver Shepherd, who had been promoted to colonel of the 15th U.S. Infantry, of command of the Regular Brigade and assigned Brigadier General Gordon Granger to the command. Many of the remaining veteran officers of the regiment obtained reassignments because of their admiration for Shepherd and lack of faith in Granger. Although these officers were lost to the brigade, Rosecrans recognized the developing problem and after 19 days replaced Granger with Brigadier General John Haskell King, an officer of the brigade who was promoted from major in the regular army and who had been wounded at the Battle of Shiloh.

Between June 24 and July 3, 1863, Major General Rosecrans maneuvered General Bragg's Confederate army out of middle Tennessee and into the defenses around Chattanooga in the Tullahoma Campaign (Middle Tennessee Campaign) without being required to fight a pitched battle. As the campaign started, Major Sidney Coolidge had to take command of the Regular Brigade because Brigadier General King's previous wound had not healed sufficiently to permit him to serve in the field. Coolidge performed well as the regulars drove Confederate forces from Hoover's Gap in the Battle of Hoover's Gap on June 26, 1863, in some of the sharpest fighting of the campaign. The Army of the Cumberland suffered fewer than 600 casualties while advancing 80 miles during the campaign.

After participating in the Tullahoma campaign's maneuvers, the Regular Brigade had spent its time drilling and then repairing roads and guarding railroad lines. After a pause to regroup, Rosecrans moved his army again on August 16, 1863, across the Cumberland Plateau to the Tennessee River and Sequatchie River banks. In early September 1863, the Army of the Cumberland began to advance on Chattanooga. With Thomas's and McCook's corps threatening his supply lines, Bragg evacuated Chattanooga on September 8, 1863. On September 10, 1863, the Regular Brigade crossed the Tennessee River at Bridgeport, Alabama, with General King in command. Captain Albert B. Dod had joined the 15th U.S. Infantry and, since he outranked Captain Keteltas, assumed command of the 1st Battalion while Keteltas resumed command of Company E.

=== Battle of Chickamauga ===
After marching his army into Chattanooga, Major General Rosecrans continued to advance his force through southeastern Tennessee and into northern Georgia but his troops were widely dispersed. Rosecrans did not expect General Bragg to attack his force and did not know that Bragg had received 20,000 additional men and had two more divisions from Virginia due to arrive soon. Bragg planned to attack the scattered Union Army units and to retake Chattanooga after defeating them. On September 12, 1863, Rosecrans finally realized that Bragg was not continuing to retreat and apparently intended to fight. The regulars had been detached from their division, now commanded by Brigadier General Absalom Baird, and were still trying to catch up on this date. Thomas and McCook had to bring their corps north toward Chattanooga in order to concentrate the scattered Union Army in one location. As the Union divisions moved along Chickamauga Creek, Rosecrans had Brigadier General Thomas Leonidas Crittenden's division move south to Lee & Gordon's Mill, along the Chickamauga, to support the movements of Thomas and McCook. On September 18, 1863, Bragg's Confederate force secured two bridges over the Chickamauga and prepared to attack Crittenden's position the next day. The same night, Rosecrans ordered Thomas to bring three divisions, including Baird's, north to Crittenden's position. The regulars arrived on the field about 6 miles from Chattanooga at sunrise on September 19, 1863.

The tired regular soldiers reached Kelly's Field along the La Fayette Road at about 6:00 a.m. on September 19, 1863 and according to Carson, they were ordered to a position a mile to the east of the field. Before most of the Union soldiers could finish breakfast, advancing Confederates reached their position. Alerted to the Confederate advance, Union Army buglers sounded "To the Colors." Baird's division pressed forward to fight the Confederates near Reed's bridge. At the outset, the regulars pushed back the advancing Confederates and captured 126 prisoners. An entire division under the command of Confederate Brigadier General St. John R. Liddell now arrived to strengthen the Confederate right and moved to flank Brigadier General Baird's division. Two of Baird's brigades broke from the attack. Brigadier General King now turned his force of regulars to face the advancing Confederates and to defend the withdrawal of Artillery Battery H from their exposed advanced position. Captain Dod's 1st Battalion, 15th U.S. Infantry closed the battery's right. The battery was unable to retreat because the Confederates shot their horses. The soldiers manning the battery were unable to fire many shots because they were lightly supported and the men were being rapidly shot down as they worked. As numerous Confederates overwhelmed the regulars, the 16th U.S. Infantry lost 272 of 307 officers and men killed, wounded or missing. After firing a few volleys, most of the 15th U.S. Infantry retreated. About 400 soldiers, mostly from the 15th and 18th U.S. Infantry regiments, were taken prisoner at this early stage of the battle.

At this dire and critical point in the battle when the XIV Corps lines were wavering and in disorder, on his own initiative, Bugler William J. Carson of Company E, the 1st Battalion, 15th U.S. Infantry, with his bugle in one hand and a sword in the other, blew repeated calls, including "halt," "rally," and "forward" calls, in a successful attempt to rally the remaining Union troops. Carson attached himself to the 18th U.S. Infantry's color guard and rallied part of that regiment. Surprised by this sudden stand of defiance, the Confederates slowed their pursuit of the men in retreat. Joined by the 9th Ohio Infantry and the 17th Ohio Infantry, remaining regulars then counterattacked and recaptured the Regular Brigade's artillery. General King then reformed the remaining regulars who had fallen back and sent a party to bring the guns back to the brigade's current position. They were able to do so but did not have enough time or men to save the remaining equipment or ammunition before the Confederates renewed their attack.

The regulars had been decimated by the undetected flank attack early on the first day of the battle. The survivors of the 16th Infantry were combined with the 19th Infantry while the 15th Infantry and 18th Infantry had less than half of their men present, many of them wounded. As the day wore on, the remaining regulars were sent to protect the left flank of Thomas's line as the fighting continued on the center and right. Between the officers who had left the brigade during the command changes and the killed and wounded, few experienced leaders were in command at the start of the battle and fewer still remained to lead the brigade after the first day of the battle on September 19.

The worn out Union troops held their position at nightfall on September 19, Unlike his actions at Stones River, Bragg planned to renew the attack because he had 11 brigades on hand or about to arrive which had not participated in the battle on the first day. During the night, the Union commanders tried to put their forces in position for the expected fight on the next day. Thomas placed Baird's division on the northern end of the field, with the Regular Brigade assigned to hold the left end of the line until the anticipated arrival of Major General James S. Negley's division, which Thomas had requested Rosecrans to send. Meanwhile, Brigadier General King placed his men in a column of battalions in an effort to ward off a flanking attack by the Confederates if the regulars had to defend the end of the line. Captain Dod, with about 190 men of the 1st Battalion, 15th U.S. Infantry, held the third line of this defense.

At a dawn inspection, Thomas found that Negley's division had not arrived to support the regulars. Rosecrans promised to send them, which he had not done before as Thomas had requested and expected. Rosecrans discovered that Negley's division was facing a large body of Confederates so he ordered Brigadier General Thomas J. Wood to replace Negley in the line and for Negley to remain in place until relieved, except that Negley should send his reserve brigade to the north to reinforce the regulars immediately. Upon arrival at the end of the line, that brigade was sent beyond the end of the line in anticipation of Negley's other brigades' imminent arrival, when in fact they were not yet on the way. Colonel Joseph Dodge's brigade was nearby and was hastily moved to the end of the regular's line. They had no time to throw up even the most elementary defenses before being forced into action. The Confederates in fact soon attacked the Union left but they did so in a piecemeal and disorganized manner that allowed the regulars to defend their position with few initial casualties. Then the Confederates turned their attention from the regulars and were able to rout Brigadier General Samuel Beatty's brigade from Negley's division. Beatty's recently arrived brigade was strung out north of the end of the line held by Dodge and the regulars. The advancing Confederates turned down the La Fayette Road to deliver a flanking attack, which scattered Dodge's men after they had fired only one volley. The regulars deployed to cover their flank as they were strongly attacked. The stiff attack caused some of the 18th U.S. Infantry's men to begin to fall back. Historian Mark W. Johnson says it was at this point that the 18th received "a one-man reinforcement," Private William J. Carson, bugler of the 1st Battalion, Company E, 15th U.S. Infantry.

Carson picked up a rifle with bayonet and ran up and down the line sending men back into the fight, including an officer. As even these efforts began to fail and more men started to withdraw, in Carson's own words:

I threw down my gun, rushed out some 30 yards to the color bearer of the 18th and said to him 'Let us rally these men or the whole left is gone.' The brave fellow stopped and waved his flag. I sounded to the colors. The men cheered. They rushed into line. Still sounding the rally, I passed back and forth of the forming line, and what a few minutes before seemed a hopeless disastrous rout, now turned out to be a complete victory. The retreat had been checked and the enemy driven back with awful slaughter. So severe was their repulse, that within a few minutes we were firing toward our rear into the enemy who were pressing Beatty's troops back.

The fight was not over as the 19th U.S. Infantry's skirmishers were cut off from the main body of defenders and were overwhelmed. The remaining troops of the 18th U.S. Infantry, accompanied by Private Carson, had to withdraw to King's third line of defense, which was manned by Carson's 15th U.S. Infantry Regiment. With the arrival of some timely reinforcements, the Union left wing was strong enough to throw back the Confederate attack, although the battle continued. Since the north or left end of the Union line was the only location where serious fighting had been taking place, Rosecrans ordered several units, including Brigadier General John Milton Brannan's division to shift to the north. For the second time that morning, Brannan decided it would imperil the Union line to move and he kept his men where they were, but Brigadier General Thomas J. Wood obeyed Rosecrans's order to fill the supposed gap that Brannan's departure would create. This blunder opened a real gap in the Union line. Eleven thousand Confederates moved into the gap, collapsing the southern portion of the Union line. About half the Union Army of the Cumberland began to flee the battlefield while the rest of the army was unaware of the disaster. Nonetheless, Thomas's divisions, with timely reinforcement by Brigadier General Gordon Granger's Reserve Division, were able to hold their position and withdraw that evening in order because of the defense and delaying actions of their rear guard.

Heavy casualties were sustained by both sides in the battle, with the Regular Brigade suffering 56 per cent of its men killed, wounded or missing. This included 61 killed, 255 wounded and 523 missing or captured. Carson said he found 10 bullet holes in his clothing and was "slightly wounded".

=== Aftermath: Prisoner, Medal of Honor ===
Carson and many other soldiers of the Regular Brigade and a few other supporting regiments did not escape with most of Thomas's men but were captured late in the day after they ran out of ammunition. Nonetheless, Carson's bugle calls earlier in the day had not only rallied the troops but had led the Confederates to believe that the Union line had been reinforced. General Bragg delayed a charge on the Union position from 3:30 pm to almost 6:30 pm when all his available forces had been gathered for the assault. By the time the charge was made and the small group of remaining defenders had to surrender, most of the Union Army that had not fled even earlier in the day had escaped and was nearing the defenses of Chattanooga.

Captain Galloway of the 15th U.S. Infantry recounted Carson's heroism as well as the events near the end of the second day of the Battle of Chickamauga which led to Carson's capture in recommending him for award of the Medal of Honor:

442 Forty-first Street, Chicago, Ill.,

To all whom it may concern: I have known W. J. Carson, of Muncie, Ind., late bugler of Company E, 1st Battalion, 15th Infantry, since 1862, as a citizen, perfectly upright, honest and worthy of the highest esteem from all.

As a soldier his standing was perfect: his name was a synonym of bravery, and his patriotism of the highest order. In battle he was apparently lost to fear, and his every action heroic. His acts of heroism on the 20th of September, 1863, that came under my personal observation, I believe are without a parallel of individual bravery of that memorable battle. He with his bugle made it possible for us to check a most disastrous retreat. We were able through the assistance of Carson to rally over 2500 of our division and retake the position we had lost, which was then held by us until night. W. J. Carson, along with 1900 of us, after being completely surrounded by the enemy, and out of all ammunition, were captured at 6:30 P. M. on the original line of battle, the entire army, at that time, having retired several miles toward Chattanooga. He was as brave a man as ever wore the blue, and I deem it a great privilege and honor to be remembered among his friends and acquaintances. As to his simple request, asking the Government to award him the Medal of Honor for gallantry and heroism, I am sure no more patriotic or gallant breast ever merited the distinguishing mark of bravery from the U. S. Government than that of W. J. Carson.

— W. G. Galloway, Lite Captain 15th U. S. Infantry.

In his report on the battle, Captain Dod wrote of Carson as follows:

OFFICE COMMISSARY OF MUSTERS, FOURTH ARMY CORPS, Chattanooga, Tenn., October 19, 1863.

COLONEL: At the request of Major-General Rosecrans, I have the honor to make the following report of Private William J. Carson, bugler in the First Battalion, Fifteenth U. S. Infantry;

On Saturday, September 19, when the regular brigade was falling back, he behaved with most conspicuous gallantry; with a sword in one hand and his bugle in the other, he sounded constantly the "Halt," the "Rally," and the "Forward;" espying a stand of colors belonging to the Eighteenth U. S. Infantry, he rushed up to them and sounded "To the color." His conduct attracted the notice and elicited the admiration of the whole brigade. On Sunday, September 20, before our battalion was engaged, the Eighteenth, being pressed by vastly superior numbers, was falling back; Carson by some means became the possessor of a musket and constituted himself a "provost guard." One of the officers attempted to pass him, but he positively refused to allow it, stating that it was against his orders. All this time he continued to sound the various calls on his bugle. I regret to state that his fate remains a mystery; he was last seen by me late on Sunday afternoon behind the breastworks. I can only hope that he is a prisoner. ...

I have the honor to be, very respectfully, your obedient servant,

ALBERT B. DOD,

Captain 15th U. S. Infty., Comdg. Batt. at Chickamauga.

After he was captured at Chickamauga, Carson spent three months in Pemberton Prison in Richmond, Virginia, where he was ill for the entire period. When he was released in early 1864, Carson weighed only 64 pounds and was said to have been in the worst condition of any soldier that ever came to Annapolis, Maryland, for recuperation after release from a Confederate prisoner of war camp.

Musician William J. Carson was one of nine soldiers awarded the Medal of Honor for his heroism in the Battle of Chickamauga on September 19 and 20, 1863.

== Medal of Honor citation ==
Carson's army service showed a willingness to do whatever duty called for. The praise from his officers culminated in the highest praise from his government, conferral of the Medal of Honor for his distinguished services at the Battle of Chickamauga on September 19 and 20, 1863.

Army Medal

Medal of Honor

Private Carson's official Medal of Honor citation reads:

The President of the United States of America, in the name of Congress, takes pleasure in presenting the Medal of Honor to Musician William J. Carson, United States Army, for extraordinary heroism on 19 September 1863, while serving with Company E, 15th U.S. Infantry, in action at Chickamauga, Georgia. At a critical stage in the battle when the 14th Corps lines were wavering and in disorder, Musician Carson, on his own initiative bugled "to the colors" amid the 18th U.S. Infantry who formed by him, and held the enemy. Within a few minutes he repeated his action amid the wavering 2d Ohio Infantry. This bugling deceived the enemy who believed reinforcements had arrived. Thus, they delayed their attack.

== Later life ==
After the war, William J. Carson was married to the former Deborah J. Conn (1834 – November 15, 1934). The Carsons had a son, Clarence H. Carson (1867 – March 27, 1939).

William Carson was a member of the Grand Army of the Republic after the war. Colonel Goddard recounted his good standing in the community and his proud playing of the bugle calls at meetings of his G.A.R. Post:

Comrade Carson is a member of Williams Post G.A.R., "Department of Indiana", and at its meeting blows the calls which rallied the Regulars on the bloody field of Chickamauga. He is the proud head of an intelligent and devoted family, to whom he will leave a good name and this imperishable record of gallant service to his country.

Col. C. Goddard,

Battle of Chickamauga

Assistant Adjutant General

Carson became the Vice President of the Survivors of the Regular Brigade, Army of the Cumberland for at least three years in the 1890s. In 1895, the veterans returned to the Stones River battlefield and to the Chickamauga battlefield for the dedication of the national battlefield park on the anniversary of the battle, September 19, 1895.

Carson was aged 73 at his death in Muncie, Indiana, on December 13, 1913.

== See also ==
- List of Medal of Honor recipients
- List of American Civil War Medal of Honor recipients
