= George A. Loyd =

American Civil War soldier

George Loyd
- Born: May 9, 1844; Muskingum County, Ohio
- Died: May 13, 1917 (aged 73)
- Burial place: Spring Grove Cemetery, Cincinnati, Ohio
- Military career
- Allegiance: United States of America; Union
- Branch: United States Army; Union Army
- Rank: Private
- Units: Company A, 122nd Ohio Infantry
- Conflicts: American Civil War
- Awards: Medal of Honor

George A. Loyd (May 9, 1844 – May 13, 1917) was a private in the Union Army and a Medal of Honor recipient for his actions in the American Civil War.

== Medal of Honor citation ==

Rank and organization: Private, Company A, 122nd Ohio Infantry. Place and date: At Petersburg, Va., April 2, 1865. Entered service at. ------. Birth: Muskingum County, Ohio. Date of issue: April 16, 1891.

Citation:

Capture of division flag of General Heth.

== See also ==
- List of Medal of Honor recipients
- List of American Civil War Medal of Honor recipients: G–L
