= Benjamin Hilliker =

American Civil War Medal of Honor recipient

Benjamin F. Hilliker
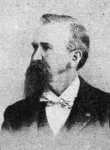
- Born: May 23, 1843; Colden, New York
- Died: October 18, 1916 (aged 73); Los Angeles, California
- Burial place: Hollywood Forever Cemetery, Hollywood, California
- Military career
- Allegiance: United States of America; Union
- Branch: United States Army; Union Army
- Service years: 1861–1863
- Rank: Drummer
- Units: Company A, 8th Wisconsin Volunteer Infantry Regiment
- Conflicts: American Civil War
- Awards: Medal of Honor

Benjamin Franklin Hilliker (May 23, 1843 – October 18, 1916) served in the Union Army during the American Civil War. He received the Medal of Honor.

Hilliker was born on May 23, 1843. He joined the 8th Wisconsin Infantry from Waupaca, Wisconsin in August 1861, and was discharged due to his wounds in August 1863. Hilliker died on October 18, 1916, and was buried at Hollywood Forever Cemetery in Los Angeles, California.

== Medal of Honor citation ==
His award citation reads:

For extraordinary heroism on 4 June 1863, while serving with Company A, 8th Wisconsin Infantry, in action at Mechanicsburg, Mississippi. When men were needed to oppose a superior Confederate force Musician Hilliker laid down his drum for a rifle and proceeded to the front of the skirmish line which was about 120 feet from the enemy. While on this volunteer mission and firing at the enemy he was hit in the head with a minie ball which passed through him. An order was given to "lay him in the shade; he won't last long." He recovered from this wound being left with an ugly scar.

== See also ==
- List of Medal of Honor recipients
