= Elbridge Robinson =

American Civil War Medal of Honor recipient

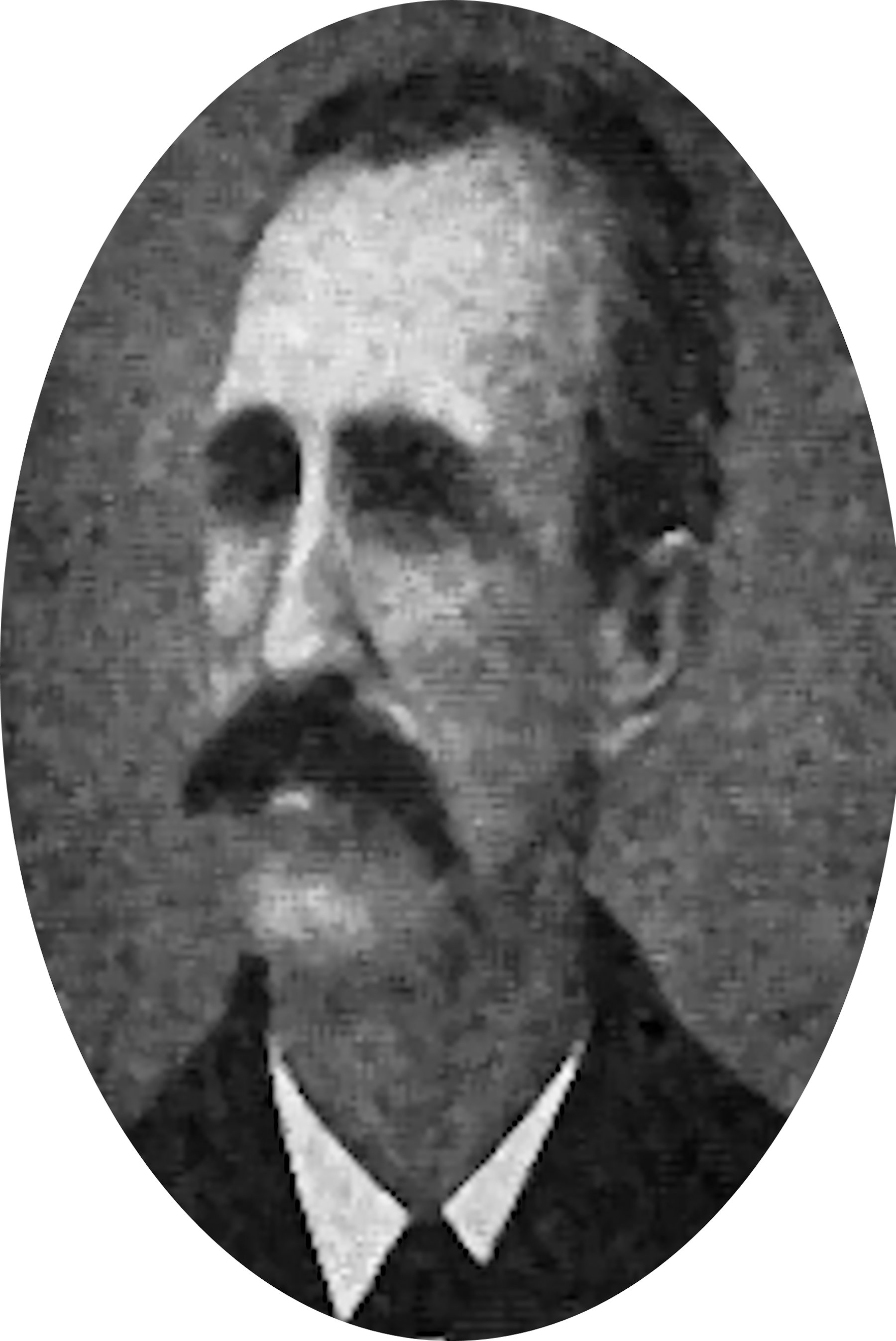
- Robinson c. 1897
- Born: January 7, 1844; Morgan County, Ohio
- Died: January 19, 1918 (aged 74); Vernon, Illinois
- Burial place: Patoka Cemetery, Patoka, Illinois
- Military career
- Allegiance: United States
- Branch: United States Army; Union Army
- Rank: Private
- Units: Company C, 122nd Ohio Infantry
- Conflicts: American Civil War • Second Battle of Winchester
- Awards: Medal of Honor

Elbridge Robinson (January 7, 1844 – January 19, 1918) was a Union Army soldier during the American Civil War. He received the Medal of Honor for gallantry during the Second Battle of Winchester, Virginia on June 14, 1863.

== Medal of Honor citation ==
“The President of the United States of America, in the name of Congress, takes pleasure in presenting the Medal of Honor to Private Elbridge Robinson, United States Army, for extraordinary heroism on 14 June 1863, while serving with Company C, 122d Ohio Infantry, in action at Winchester, Virginia. With one companion, Private Robinson voluntarily went in front of the Union line, under a heavy fire from the enemy, and carried back a helpless, wounded comrade, thus saving him from death or capture.”

His companion, John T. Patterson, also of the 122nd Ohio, also received the Medal of Honor.

== See also ==
- List of Medal of Honor recipients for the Battle of Gettysburg
- List of American Civil War Medal of Honor recipients: Q–S
