= Second Corps, Army of Northern Virginia =

- Battle flag of the Army of Northern Virginia
- Active: 1862–1865
- Country: (Confederate States of America) Confederate States
- Branch: Confederate States Army
- Type: Corps
- Part of: Army of Northern Virginia

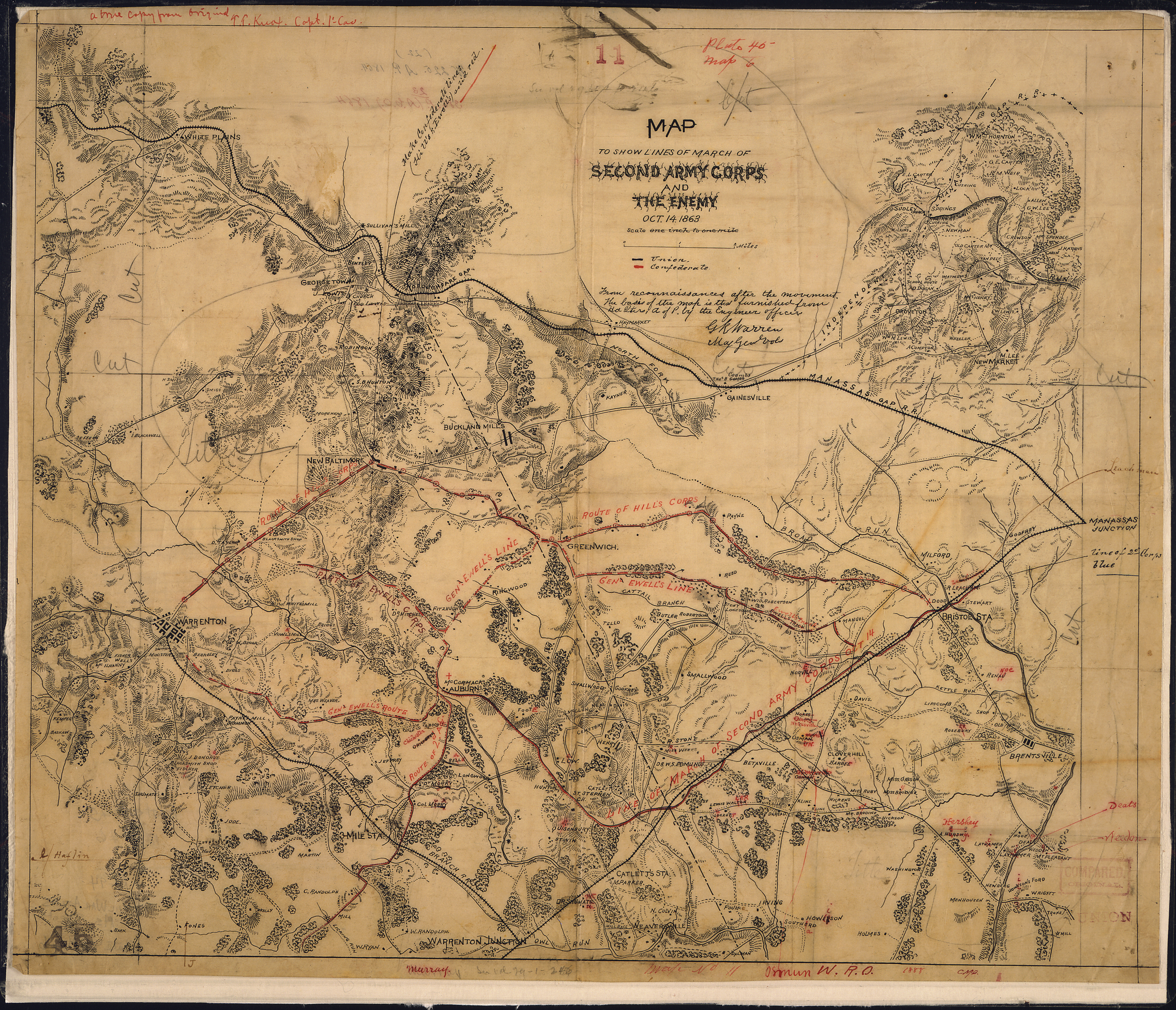
Map to Show Lines of March of Second Army Corps and The Enemy, Oct. 14, 1863

The Second Corps of the Army of Northern Virginia was a military organization within the Confederate Army of Northern Virginia during much of the American Civil War. It was officially created and named following the Battle of Sharpsburg in 1862, but comprised units in a corps organization for quite some time prior to that. The Second Corps developed a reputation for hard fighting under famed early commander Thomas J. "Stonewall" Jackson.

== Background ==
The troops comprising the Second Corps originally were known as the Second Corps of the Army of the Potomac, under the command of Major General Gustavus W. Smith. This unit was also known as the Second Division and was eventually subsumed into General Robert E. Lee's Army of Northern Virginia as a reserve in Maj. Gen. D. H. Hill's Division. When Lee was able to reorganize his army after finishing battles with Union Maj. Gen. George B. McClellan on the peninsula, he created this corps under the command of Lieutenant General Jackson, along with a sister corps under Lt. Gen. James Longstreet. Lee's reorganization was based on his evaluation of the performance of his division commanders during the Seven Days Campaign.

== Command under Lt. Gen. T. J. Jackson ==
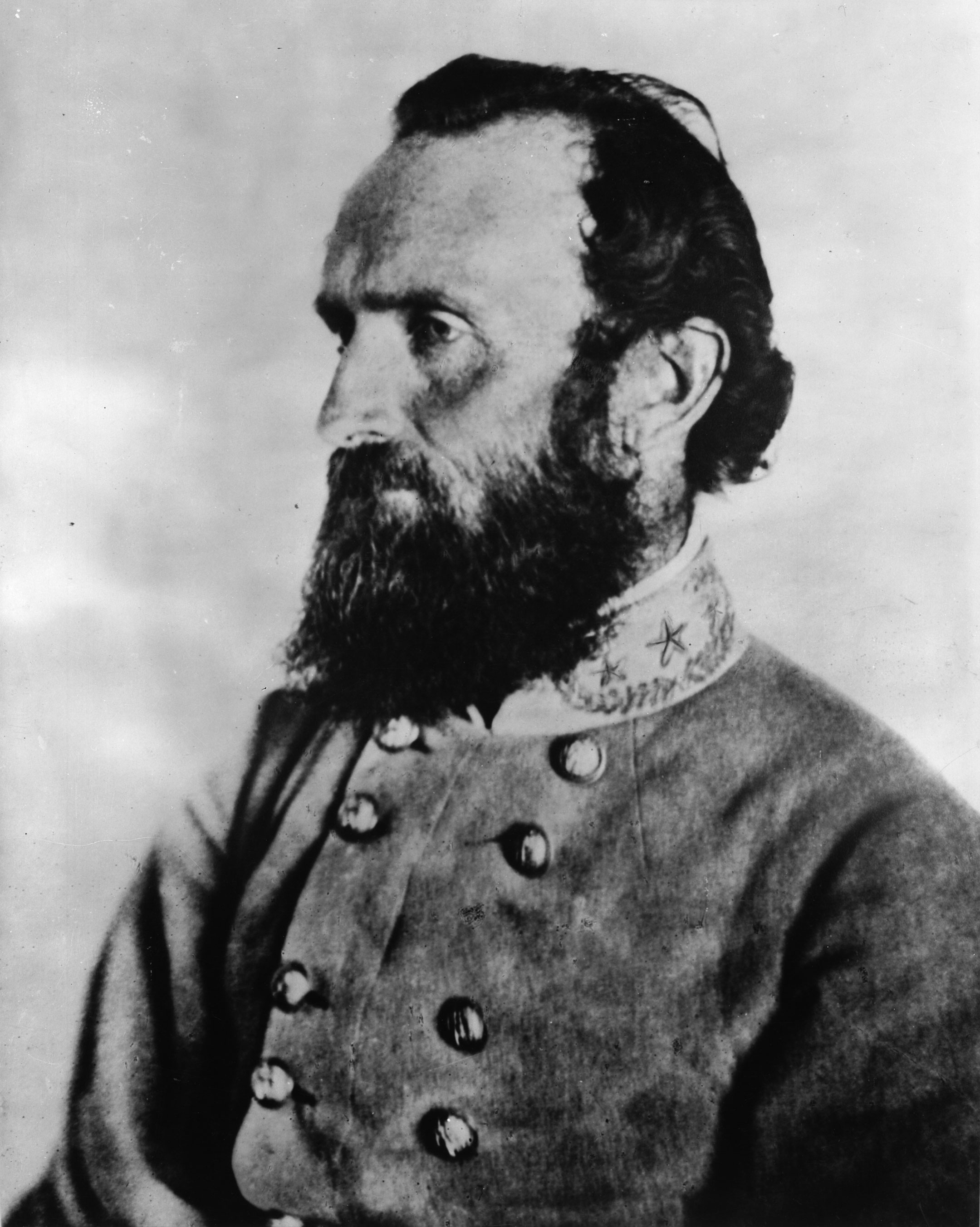
Lt. Gen. T. J. "Stonewall" Jackson.

General Jackson commanded what became the Second Corps from the end of the Seven Days Campaign on July 13, 1862, until his death after the Battle of Chancellorsville in May 1863. Jackson's official promotion to lieutenant general was made on October 10, 1862, and "Jackson's Corps" began going by the title Second Corps about 6 November. Jackson simultaneously commanded the "Valley District" of the Department of Northern Virginia, and operated his corps near Winchester, Virginia, guarding the lower Shenandoah Valley when not fully needed by Lee to be close at hand to the main army. Jackson commanded the corps at the Battle of Fredericksburg and in the subsequent series of engagements along the Rappahannock River. The corps' finest moment came during the Battle of Chancellorsville when Jackson led the famous enveloping left flank attack that routed much of Maj. Gen. Joseph Hooker's Federal Army of the Potomac. However, the subsequent loss of Jackson was devastating to Lee and the Army of Northern Virginia, and is considered to be a turning point for Lee's ability to command the army without occasionally needing to personally see to the details of corps command.

== Temporary commands under Maj. Generals A.P. Hill and J.E.B. Stuart ==
From May 2 to May 30, 1863, the Second Corps was commanded temporarily by Maj. Gen. A. P. Hill, with the exception of one day under Maj. Gen. J.E.B. Stuart on 2 May, during the crucial loss of the mortally wounded Jackson.

== Command under Lt. Gen. R. S. Ewell ==
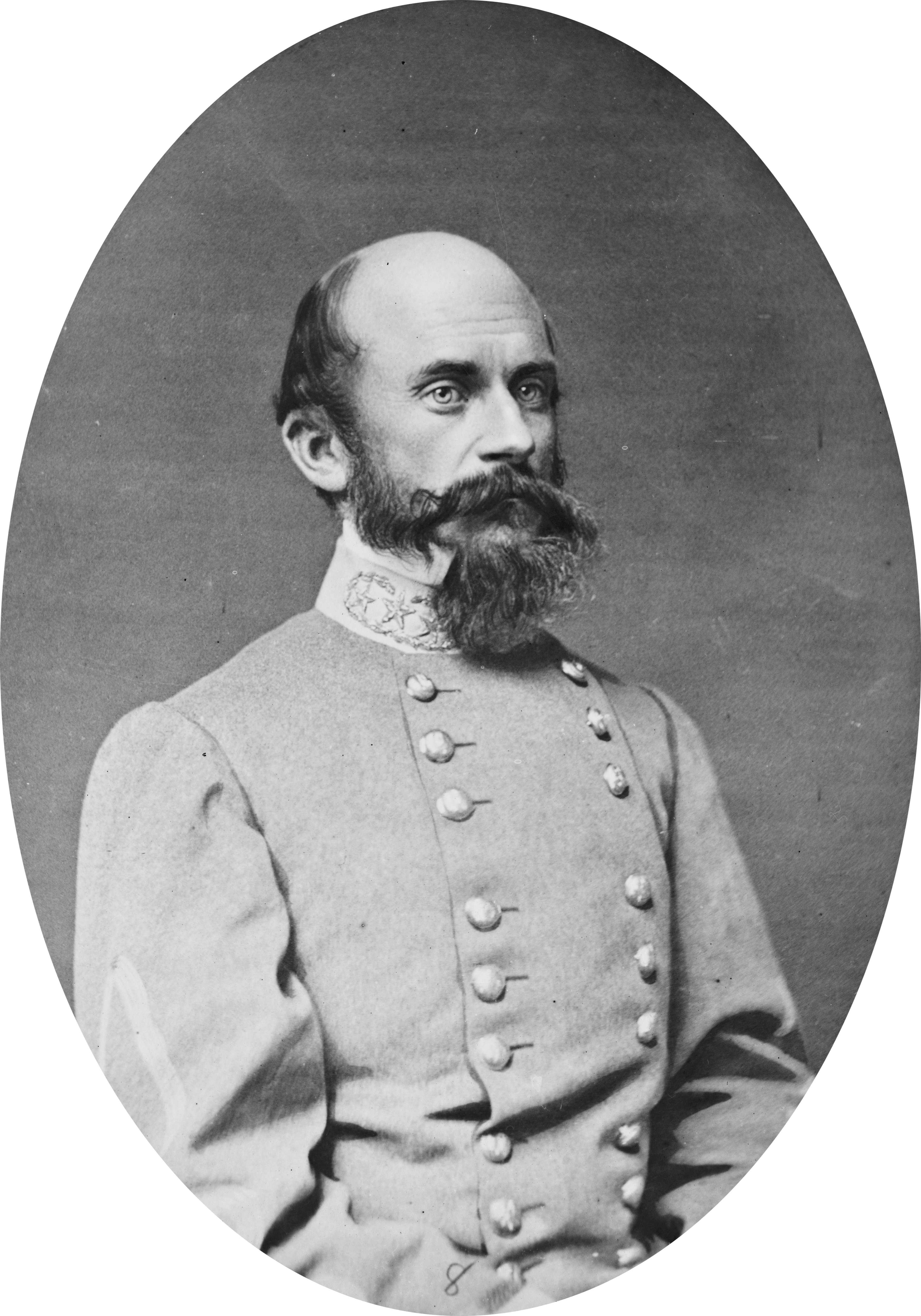
Lt. Gen. Richard S. Ewell.

Following the mop up actions and temporary commands after the Battle of Chancellorsville, General Lee formally assigned the Second Corps to Lt. Gen. Richard S. Ewell, who had recently recovered from a previous amputation of his leg after the Second Battle of Manassas. Ewell had commanded a division and worked under Jackson, and was native to this organization. Jackson had recommended Ewell for the command to Lee before he died. However, the Second Corps was reduced in size when Ewell took command, because General Lee favored creating a Third Corps under A. P. Hill. Ewell led the Second Corps through the Gettysburg campaign, after smashing the Union VIII Corps and decimating Maj. Gen. Robert H. Milroy's command at the Second Battle of Winchester. Ewell continued to command the corps through the opening campaigning of 1864 at the Battle of the Wilderness and the Battle of Spotsylvania. However, Ewell's ability as a corps commander waned, and Lee felt it was necessary to reassign Ewell to the Department of Richmond on May 29, 1864.

== Command under Lt. Gen. J.A. Early ==
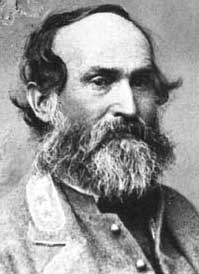
Lt. Gen. Jubal A. Early.

With Ewell's reassignment, Lt. Gen. Jubal A. Early took command, bringing a wealth of experience. He had already temporarily commanded both the Second and Third Corps during the incapacitation of Ewell and Hill during The Battle of the Wilderness. Early had much experience as a division commander and had served under Generals Jackson and Ewell. Therefore, Lee decided in June 1864 to use the Second Corps on yet another invasion of the Union in an attempt to cause General Ulysses S. Grant to fall back from pressing Lee's front. Early took the Second Corps, technically as a detached Army of the Valley, down (northward) through the Shenandoah Valley and, following the Battle of Monocacy, to the outskirts of Washington, D.C. at Fort Stevens, raiding the Baltimore and Ohio Railroad and countryside of Maryland and Pennsylvania along the way. But the invasion was short lived, as the Union was able to respond with a counter campaign under Maj. Gen. Philip Sheridan, who pressed Early back into Virginia with overwhelming Union forces. As Sheridan fought Early up (southward) into the Shenandoah Valley, Sheridan commenced upon his famous "Burning" of the Valley, destroying crops, livestock, farms, barns, homes and destroying everything in his path. Early's Army of the Valley, the bulk of which came from the Second Corps, sustained heavy losses in the battles at Winchester, Fisher's Hill, and Cedar Creek. In November and December, the greater part of Early's forces were ordered back to Richmond, first Kershaw's division in November, followed by the three divisions of the Second Corps in December.

== Command under Maj. Gen. J.B. Gordon ==
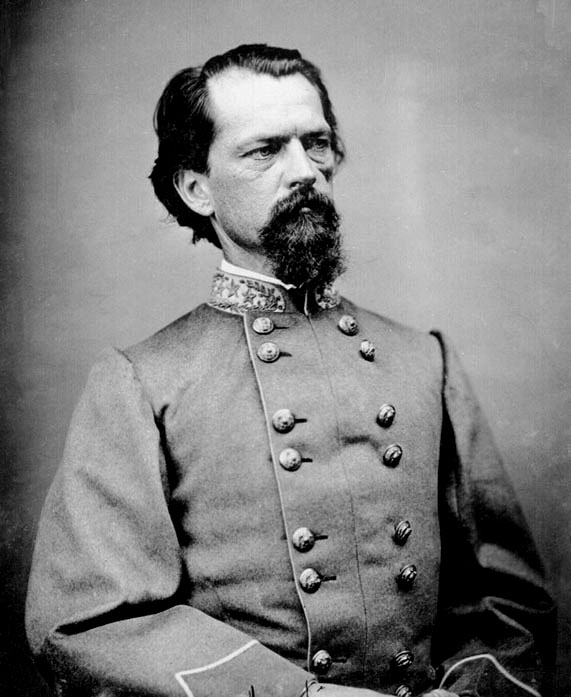
Maj. Gen. John B. Gordon.

The Second Corps thus rejoined the main body of the Army of Northern Virginia, and Maj. Gen. John B. Gordon was placed in command on December 20, 1864. Gordon commanded the corps, the "left wing" of Lee's depleted army, until it was surrendered at Appomattox Court House, Virginia, on April 9, 1865. A significant action conducted while Gordon was in command was the Battle of Fort Stedman, which began with a surprise attack by the corps, which achieved some success before it was repulsed by Union reserves. Gordon's command also was in the van of the army during its last combat near Appomattox Court House. Gordon and Second Corps led the surrender parade of Confederate infantry.

== See also ==
- First Corps, Army of Northern Virginia
- Third Corps, Army of Northern Virginia
- Fourth Corps, Army of Northern Virginia
- Cavalry Corps, Army of Northern Virginia
