= 12th West Virginia Infantry Regiment =

- Flag of West Virginia
- Active: August 30, 1862, to June 16, 1865
- Country: United States
- Allegiance: Union
- Branch: Infantry
- Engagements: Second Winchester; Gettysburg campaign Battle of New Market; Battle of Piedmont; Battle of Lynchburg; Battle of Cool Springs; Battle 2nd Kernstown; Battle of Opequon; Battle Fishers Hill; Battle of Hatcher's Run; Siege of Petersburg; Battle Fort Gregg; Battle Rice's Station; Battle Appomattox

The 12th West Virginia Infantry Regiment was an infantry regiment that served in the Union Army during the American Civil War. The regiment was particularly distinguished for its successful attack on Fort Gregg during the 1864 to 1865 Siege of Petersburg, receiving a golden eagle for its flagstaff as a token of appreciation from corps commander John Gibbon.

== Service ==
The 12th West Virginia Infantry Regiment was organized at Wheeling in western Virginia on August 30, 1862, and was assigned to duty in the Shenandoah Valley as part of the VIII Army Corps's Middle Department until January 1863.

For much of the first half of 1863, the regiment served at Winchester, Virginia, under Maj. Gen. Robert H. Milroy, and were defeated in their first significant combat action during the Second Battle of Winchester, being pushed off a wooded ridgeline near Kernstown, Virginia, by elements of the Confederate brigade of John B. Gordon on June 13. Two days later, they were scattered by Robert E. Rodes' attack and reassembled at Bloody Run, Pennsylvania. The 12th then served in Col. Andrew T. McReynolds' command at Martinsburg, West Virginia, until December 1863.

The regiment was a part of the Department of West Virginia until December 1864, and it saw action in several fights during the Valley Campaigns of 1864, including the Battle of Opequon or Third Winchester, not far from the scene of its first combat.

At the end of the year, the 12th West Virginia joined the Army of the James's 2nd Brigade, Independent Division, XXIV Army Corps. The regiment served in the Siege of Petersburg, and on April 2, 1865, distinguished itself for gallantry in a desperate hand-to-hand conflict that resulted in the seizure of Confederate-held Fort Gregg. Maj. Gen. John Gibbon, commanding the XXIV Corps, presented the regiment an engraved golden eagle for their flagstaff, with the inscription "Presented by Maj.-Gen'l John Gibbon to the 12th W. Va. Volunteer Infantry, for Gallant Conduct in the Assault upon Fort Gregg, April 2, 1865." Corporal Andrew O. Apple of Company I was also later awarded the U.S. Medal of Honor for saving the regiment's flag that day.

The 12th West Virginia mustered out of military service on June 16, 1865.

== Casualties ==
The 12th West Virginia Volunteer Infantry Regiment suffered 3 officers and 56 enlisted men killed in battle or died from wounds, and 131 enlisted men dead from disease, for a total of 190 fatalities.

== Commanding officers and other notable members ==
- Colonel John B. Klunk, commanding officer, August 1862–September 1863
- William B. Curtis, commanding officer, January 1864–June 1865
- Lieutenant Josiah M. Curtis (son of William B. Curtis), U.S. Medal of Honor winner
- Lieutenant James R. Durham, U.S. Medal of Honor winner
- Corporal Andrew O. Apple, U.S. Medal of Honor winner
- Private Joseph McCausland, U.S. Medal of Honor winner
- Private Charles A. Reeder, U.S. Medal of Honor winner

== See also ==
- West Virginia Units in the Civil War
- West Virginia in the American Civil War
