= Musician (rank) =

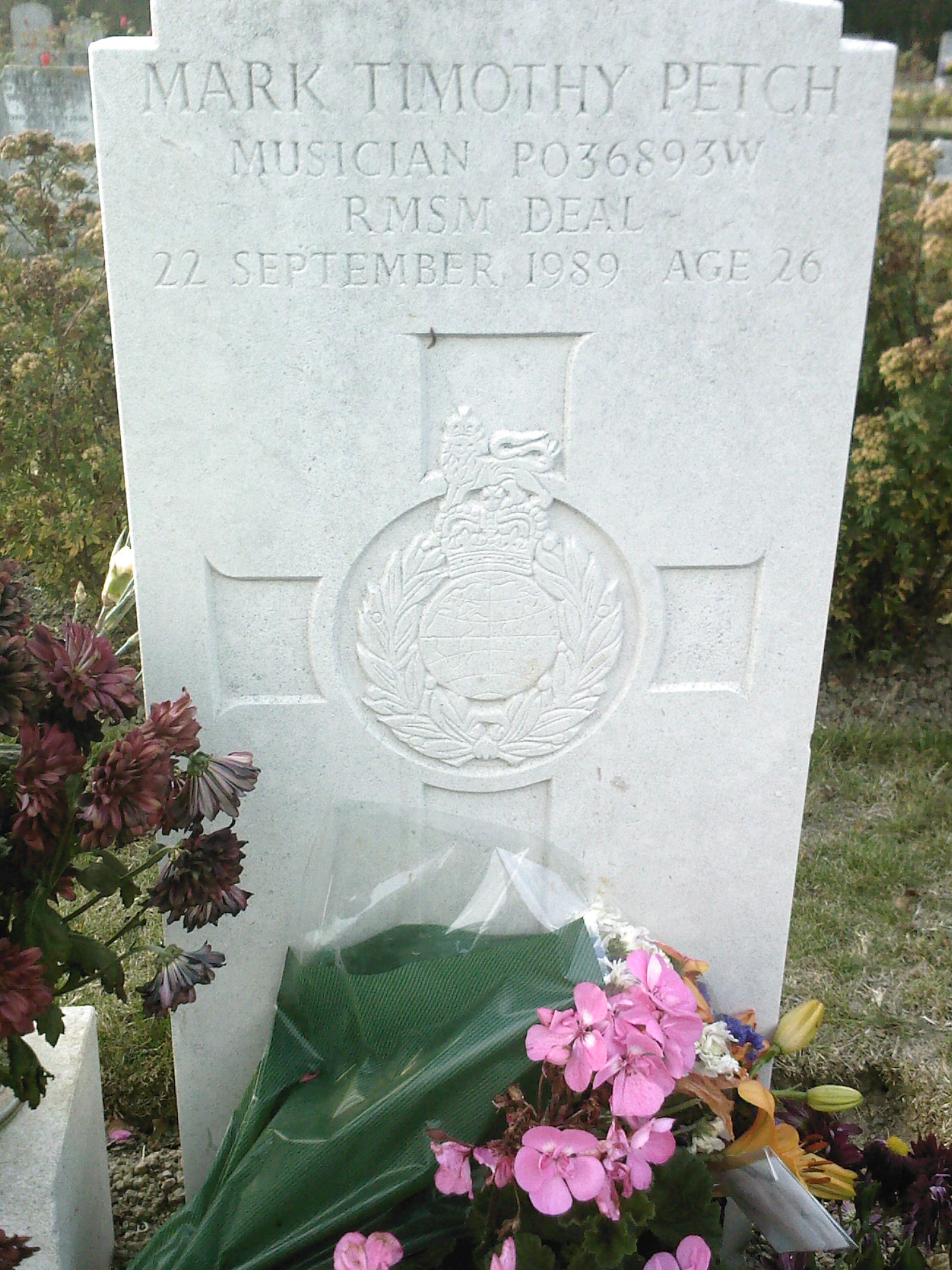
Gravestone of Mark Timothy Petch with rank given as "Musician"

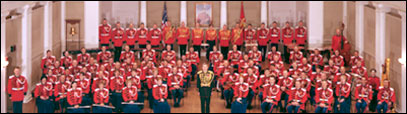
American military musicians from "The President's Own"

Musician (Mus) is a rank equivalent to Private held by members of the Royal Corps of Army Music of the British Army and the Royal Marines Band Service. The rank was also previously used in the United States Army and Confederate States Army.

There were two types of historical traditions in military bands. The first was military field music. This type of music included bugles, bagpipes, or fifes and almost always drums. This type of music was used to control troops on the battlefield as well as for entertainment. One example of controlling the troops was the drum beats setting the march cadence for the troops. Following the development of instruments such as the keyed trumpet or the saxhorn family of brass instruments, a second tradition of the all brass military band was formed.

== United States ==
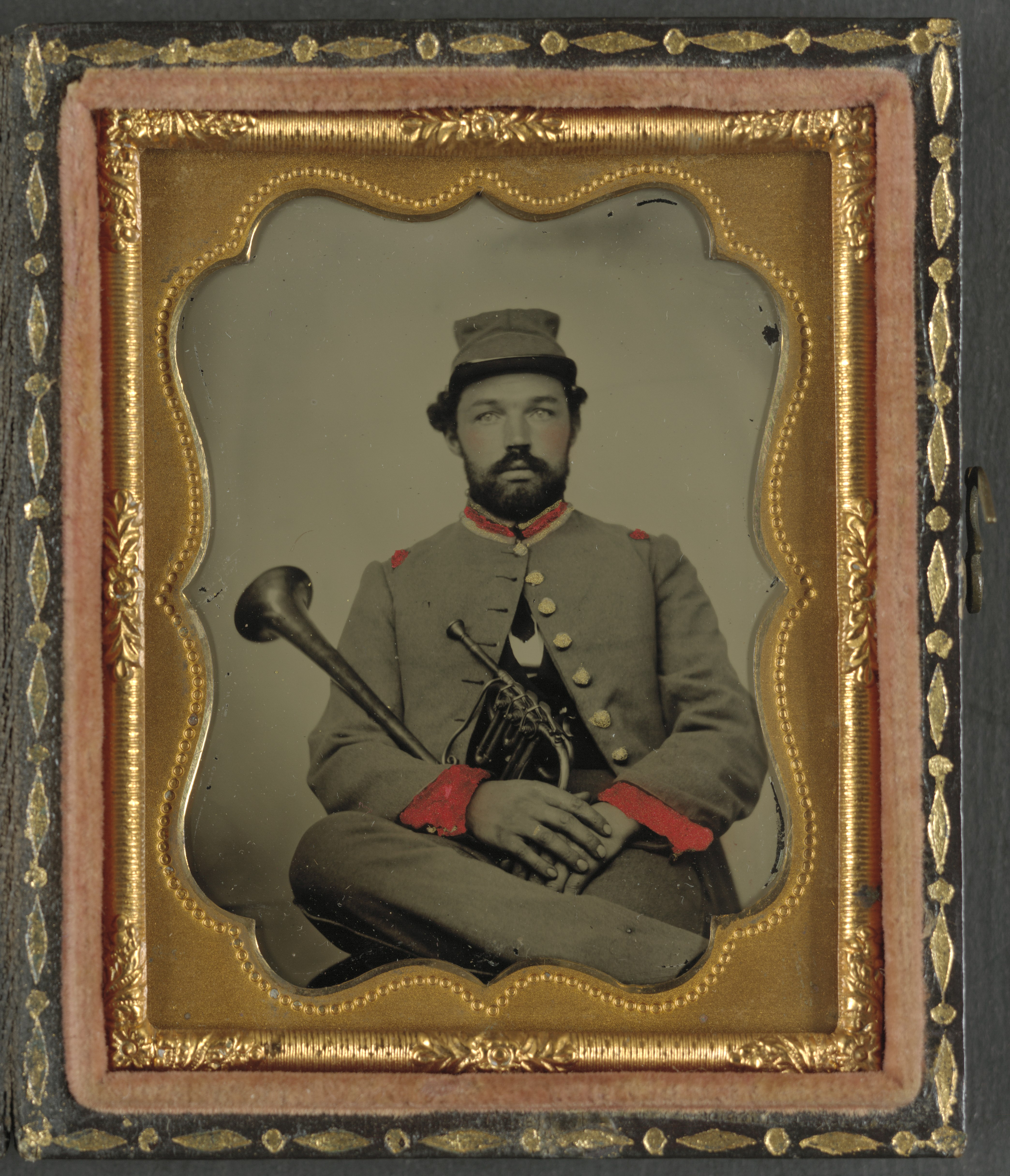
Confederate States Army musician with saxhorn

The rank of Musician was a position held by military band members, particularly during the American Civil War. The rank was just below Corporal, and just above Private. In some units it was more or less equal to the rank of Private.

During the American Civil War, military leaders with the Union and Confederate Armies relied on military musicians to entertain troops, position troops in battle, and stir them on to victory — some actually performing concerts in forward positions during the fighting.

There were two types of musicians in both armies. Each company was generally authorized two musicians whose job was to announce daily activities when in camp or garrison (i.e. reveille, taps). During battle they would signal various commands, such as when to attack or retreat, as otherwise the orders could not be heard over the din of combat. These would be trumpeters for cavalry, buglers for field artillery, or a drummer and a fifer for infantry, heavy artillery and engineers. Trumpeters were armed with sabres and pistols while the rest were armed only with a musician's sword. While not expected to perform the ordinary duties of a soldier in camp, musicians could be used for fatigue duty. It was also common practice to recruit boys under the age of eighteen as musicians with their parents' or guardians' consent. The second type were musicians who formed dedicated bands assigned to brigades and some regiments. Bands would perform for special occasions such as during inspections and parades, and would put on concerts to entertain the troops and visiting dignitaries. Artillery and volunteer infantry regiments were authorized a band of twenty-four musicians, while volunteer brigades were authorized bands of sixteen musicians.

A second duty performed by musicians during battles were to act as stretcher bearers and orderlies, for which they received their training from the regiment's surgeon. Their performance in these roles brought mixed results, and while some could be effective others proved to be more hindrance than help. The need to address this problem would eventually result in the creation of a dedication ambulance corps.

Besides basic musicians, most units were authorized principal or chief musicians. They were responsible for instructing the musicians below them, maintaining a roster and detailing musicians to various duties as needed. The related titles of drum-major or chief trumpeter had similar responsibilities. If there was no dedicated leader of the band, a principal musician fulfilled the role.

Several U.S. Army Musicians were awarded the Medal of Honor during the Civil War. These recipients include:

- William J. Carson (Musician)
- John Cook (Bugler)
- Richard Enderlin (Musician)
- Benjamin F. Hilliker (Musician)
- William H. Horsfall (Drummer)
- Orion P. Howe (Musician)
- Willie Johnston (Musician)
- John S. Kountz (Musician)
- James P. Landis (Chief Bugler)
- J. C. Julius Langbein (Musician)
- William Lord (Musician)
- William Magee (Drummer)
- Robinson B. Murphy (Musician)
- George Henry Palmer (Musician)
- John T. Patterson (Principal Musician)
- Charles W. Reed (Bugler)
- Ferdinand F. Rohm (Chief Bugler)
- Charles Schorn (Chief Bugler)
- Julian A. Scott (Drummer)
- James Snedden (Musician)
- Alason P. Webber (Musician)
- Thomas M. Wells (Chief Bugler)
