= John Patterson (Medal of Honor) =

American Union Army soldier (1838–1922)

John Thomas Patterson
- John T. Patterson, Medal of Honor recipient
- Born: February 3, 1838; Morgan County, Ohio
- Died: March 3, 1922 (aged 84); Mauston, Wisconsin
- Burial place: Mauston, Wisconsin
- Military career
- Allegiance: United States of America; Union
- Branch: United States Army; Union Army
- Service years: 1862–1865
- Rank: Principal Musician
- Unit: 122nd Ohio Infantry
- Conflicts: American Civil War
- Awards: Medal of Honor

John Thomas Patterson (February 3, 1838 – March 3, 1922) served in the Union Army during the American Civil War. He received the Medal of Honor for his actions during the Second Battle of Winchester.

== Early life ==
Patterson was born in rural Morgan County, Ohio, near McConnelsville. He married Lizzie E. Bell on January 1, 1862.

== Civil War service ==
Patterson joined the Union Army in McConnelsville on August 22, 1862. He joined Company C of the 122nd Ohio Infantry, which mustered in on October 2, 1862. He was promoted from Musician to Principal Musician on October 8 of that year.

On June 14, 1863, Patterson was wounded during the Second Battle of Winchester while he was rescuing a fellow soldier. For his valor, he received the Medal of Honor.

After rescuing a fellow soldier, Patterson was taken prisoner and held for a time at Belle Isle and Libby Prison. After being released he was present at the final Battle of Appomattox Court House, along with the rest of his regiment. He was mustered out with his company on June 26, 1865.

== Life after the Civil War ==
After the war, Patterson moved with his wife to a farm in the town of Summit, in Juneau County, Wisconsin. He served as chairman of the town board during this time.

In November 1885, he moved with his wife and children to the county seat of Mauston. Patterson was elected and served for years as county surveyor for Juneau County, from about 1889 to 1915. Patterson also served as a member of the Juneau County board, and as an officer for Mauston.

After his wife, Lizzie, died in about 1902, Patterson married Sarah Harris in about 1906. Patterson later lived in Mauston, Wisconsin. He died in 1922.

== Medal of Honor citation ==
His award citation reads:

With one companion, voluntarily went in front of the Union lines, under a heavy fire from the enemy, and carried back a helpless, wounded comrade, thus saving him from death or capture.

His companion, Pvt. Elbridge Robinson, also of the 122nd Ohio, also received the Medal of Honor.

== See also ==
- List of Medal of Honor recipients for the Gettysburg Campaign
- List of American Civil War Medal of Honor recipients: A–F
