= First Corps, Army of Northern Virginia =

- Battle flag of the Army of Northern Virginia
- Active: December 1862 – April 10, 1865
- Country: Confederate States of America
- Branch: Confederate States Army
- Type: Corps
- Role: Infantry
- Size: 2-5 divisions
- Part of: Army of Northern Virginia; Army of Tennessee
- Engagements: American Civil War: Battle of Fredericksburg; Gettysburg campaign; Battle of Chickamauga; Knoxville Campaign; Overland Campaign; Siege of Petersburg; Appomattox campaign

Commanders
- Notable commanders: James Longstreet; John Bell Hood; Richard H. Anderson

The First Corps, Army of Northern Virginia (or Longstreet's Corps) was a military unit fighting for the Confederate States of America in the American Civil War. It was formed in early 1861 and served until the spring of 1865, mostly in the Eastern Theater. The corps was commanded by James Longstreet for most of its existence.

In part or as a whole, the corps fought in nearly all of the major battles in the Eastern Theater, such as Fredericksburg, Gettysburg, The Wilderness, Cold Harbor, and the Siege of Petersburg. The corps also fought in Tennessee and performed important forage service in Suffolk, Virginia. It was disbanded shortly following Gen. Robert E. Lee's surrender to Union forces on April 9, 1865.

== Origins ==
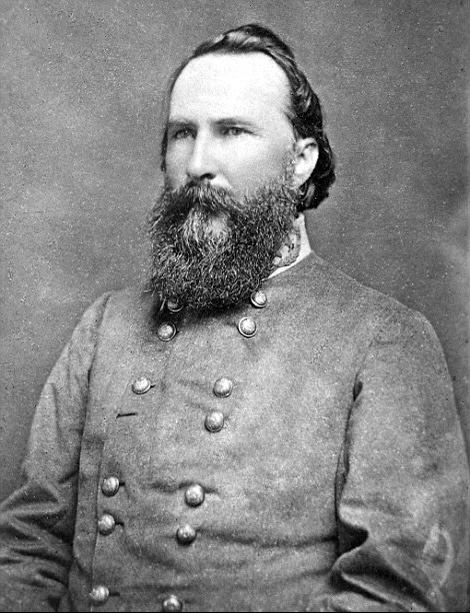
Lt. Gen. James Longstreet

On June 1, 1862, Robert E. Lee took command of the Army of the Potomac following Johnston's wounding during Battle of Seven Pines, and shortly afterwards this army would be known as the Army of Northern Virginia. Lee re-organized the army as two "wings" (corps were not legally allowed by the Confederate Congress until September 18), with Lt. Gen. James Longstreet in charge of the Right Wing and Lt. Gen.Thomas J. "Stonewall" Jackson in charge of the Left wing. With the authorization of corps later that year, the Right Wing was redesignated as the First Corps. At this time, Longstreet's corps contained twenty-one brigades organized into five divisions under major generals Lafayette McLaws, Richard H. Anderson, George E. Pickett, and John B. Hood, and Brigadier General Robert Ransom, Jr.

== 1862 ==
=== Fredericksburg ===
Note: see Fredericksburg order of battle for the command structure of the Army of Northern Virginia at this time.

The Battle of Fredericksburg was fought in and around Fredericksburg, Virginia, starting on December 11 and concluding December 15, 1862, between Lee's Army of Northern Virginia and the Federal Army of the Potomac, now commanded by Maj. Gen. Ambrose E. Burnside. The First Corps started reaching Marye's Heights on November 18 and deployed there to contest a possible pontoon crossing of the Union army at Fredericksburg, with the Second Corps following quickly once Lee was more certain of Burnside's intentions. Until Lee was convinced, the First Corps did not deeply entrench until a couple of weeks before the actions on December 12. After Jackson's arrival on December 2, Longstreet started entrenching along his portion of the line, with Anderson's division near Banks Ford on the Rappahannock and the remaining divisions on Marye's Heights; the artillery was placed along the crest of the ridge by lieutenant colonel E. Porter Alexander.

When Burnside's army started bridging the Rappahannock at Fredericksburg in the early morning of December 11, their crossing was contested by William Barksdale's brigade, which was scattered along the city's riverfront. The Confederates started firing at the Union pontooners shortly after 5 a.m., forcing them to abandon their work; Union artillery fire from Strafford Heights on the eastern side of the river was unable to drive Barksdale's brigade from their positions, despite several hours of bombardment. About 3 p.m., small groups of Union soldiers were ferried across the river by the engineers and drove the Confederates through the city. Barksdale withdrew to the main Confederate positions shortly after 7 p.m.

In January 1863, Ransom's division was transferred to North Carolina.

== 1863 ==
=== Suffolk operations and Chancellorsville ===
Longstreet and part of the First Corps (Hood's and Pickett's divisions) were detached from the Army of Northern Virginia on February 26 and sent to Suffolk, Virginia, to contend with the Federal pressure there from the Union IX Corps, as well as allow supplies in the region to be collected by Confederate authorities. During the next several months, Longstreet would serve as head of the Department of Southern Virginia and North Carolina. Starting on April 11, Longstreet used his two divisions to lay siege to Suffolk, in order to better collect supplies in the area near the city. After three weeks he was ordered to abandon the siege and return to Lee's main army but the Battle of Chancellorsville ended before Longstreet arrived.

=== Gettysburg ===
Note: see Gettysburg order of battle for the command structure of the Army of Northern Virginia at this time.

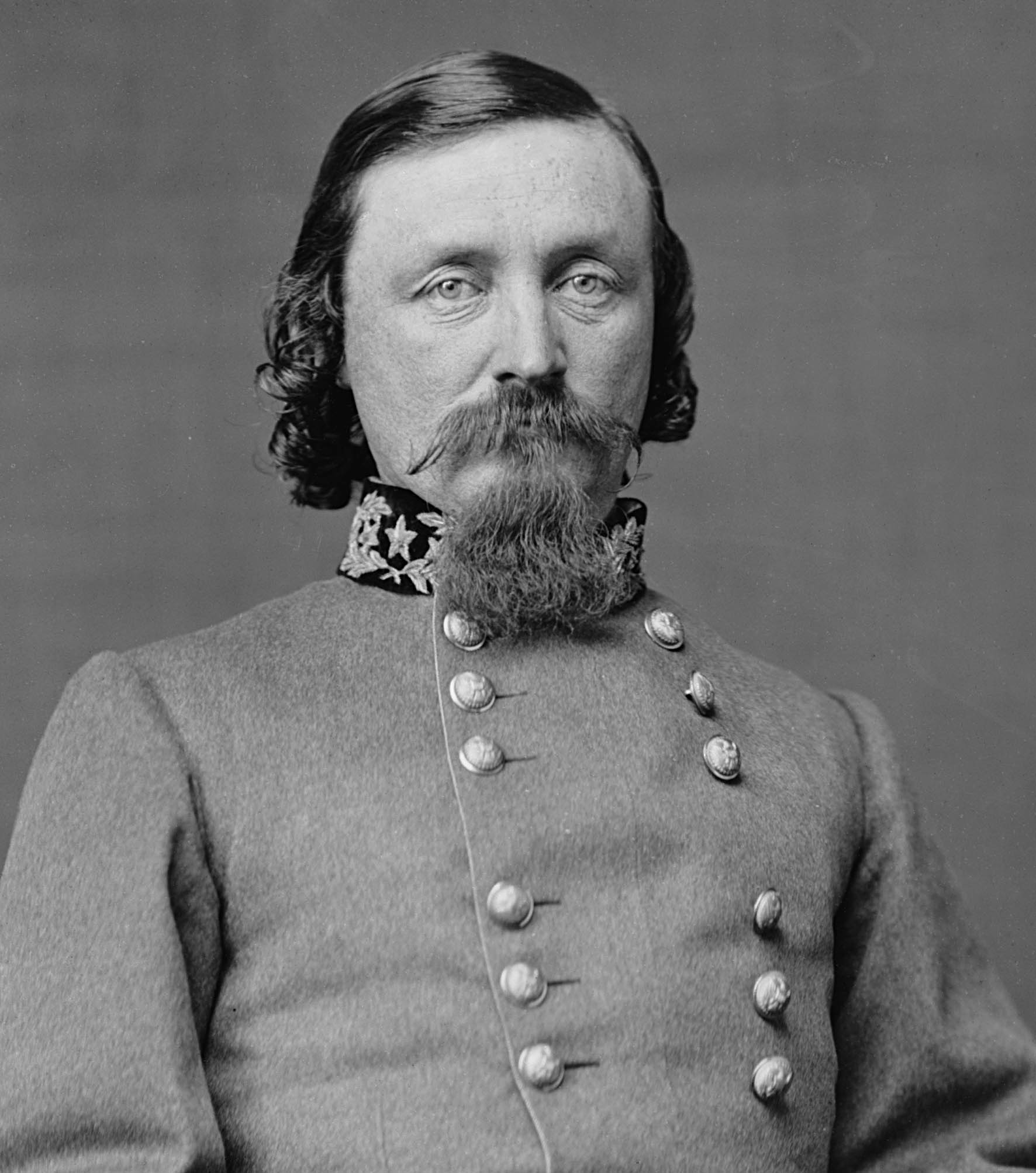
I Corps division commander and namesake of Pickett's Charge Major General George Pickett

Following the death of Jackson in May, the Army of Northern Virginia was reorganized into three corps. Longstreet retained McLaws', Hood's, and Pickett's divisions, while Richard Anderson's division was transferred to the new Third Corps commanded by A.P. Hill. Two of Pickett's brigades were detached to help the Confederate forces in North Carolina and near Richmond, leaving only three brigades in his division.

Nearing the end of June 1863 the Army of Northern Virginia had passed up the Shenandoah Valley, crossed through Maryland and entered Pennsylvania, using the Blue Ridge Mountains to hide their movements from Union cavalry patrols. The First Corps started crossing the Potomac River into Maryland on June 25, finishing the following day; the corps then camped for several days near Chambersburg, Pennsylvania.

The First Corps divisions of Hood and McLaws were far from Cashtown and would not arrive in time to partake in the first day's fighting on July 1, while Pickett's division was even farther back, being left to guard the lines of communication through Chambersburg, and would not rejoin the army until late on July 2. Meanwhile throughout this first day of battle units of the Second and Third Corps (about a third of Lee's army) pushed both Union I and XI Corps (about a fourth of Meade's army) back through Gettysburg, despite stubborn resistance by John Buford's Federal cavalry and initially the infantry as well. As the rest of the Union army came up it joined the two battered corps on the defensive line being constructed along much of Cemetery Ridge.

Late on the second day of the battle the two present divisions of the First Corps attacked the Union left flank. While Hood, on the southern right, was able to take Devil's Den from Sickles' III Corps and to deploy on Big Round Top, he wasn't able to turn the flank; his already worn out troops were halted by Col. Strong Vincent's brigade on Little Round Top. Hood himself was wounded and lost an arm. McLaw's division attacked an hour after Hood started his advance and, directly north of him, clashed into the III and V Corps with elements of the Union II Corps as reinforcements. The division, though partially supported on the left by Anderson's division, bled out on the Wheatfield and the Peach Orchard like the enemy without any greater progress.

On the third day, Pickett's diminished division, finally arrived, and two small divisions from the Third Corps attacked the center of the Union lines near Cemetery Ridge. Longstreet, in command of the attacking force, had predicted a negative result and protested; but was ordered to commence the attack nonetheless. After one of the largest, though insufficient, artillery barrages of the war under the command of Col. Alexander a column estimated at 11,000-15,000 men advanced against the positions of the II Corps and parts of the I Corps, marching nearly a mile over open field, under heavy artillery and musket fire. The attack was an overall failure, with Pickett losing over 2,600 men, all three brigade commanders, and all but one regimental commander. Though Pickett's division was only one element of the attack the whole has usually been named Pickett's Charge. The army fell back to Virginia, reaching it after a costly retreat 10 days later.

=== Chickamauga ===
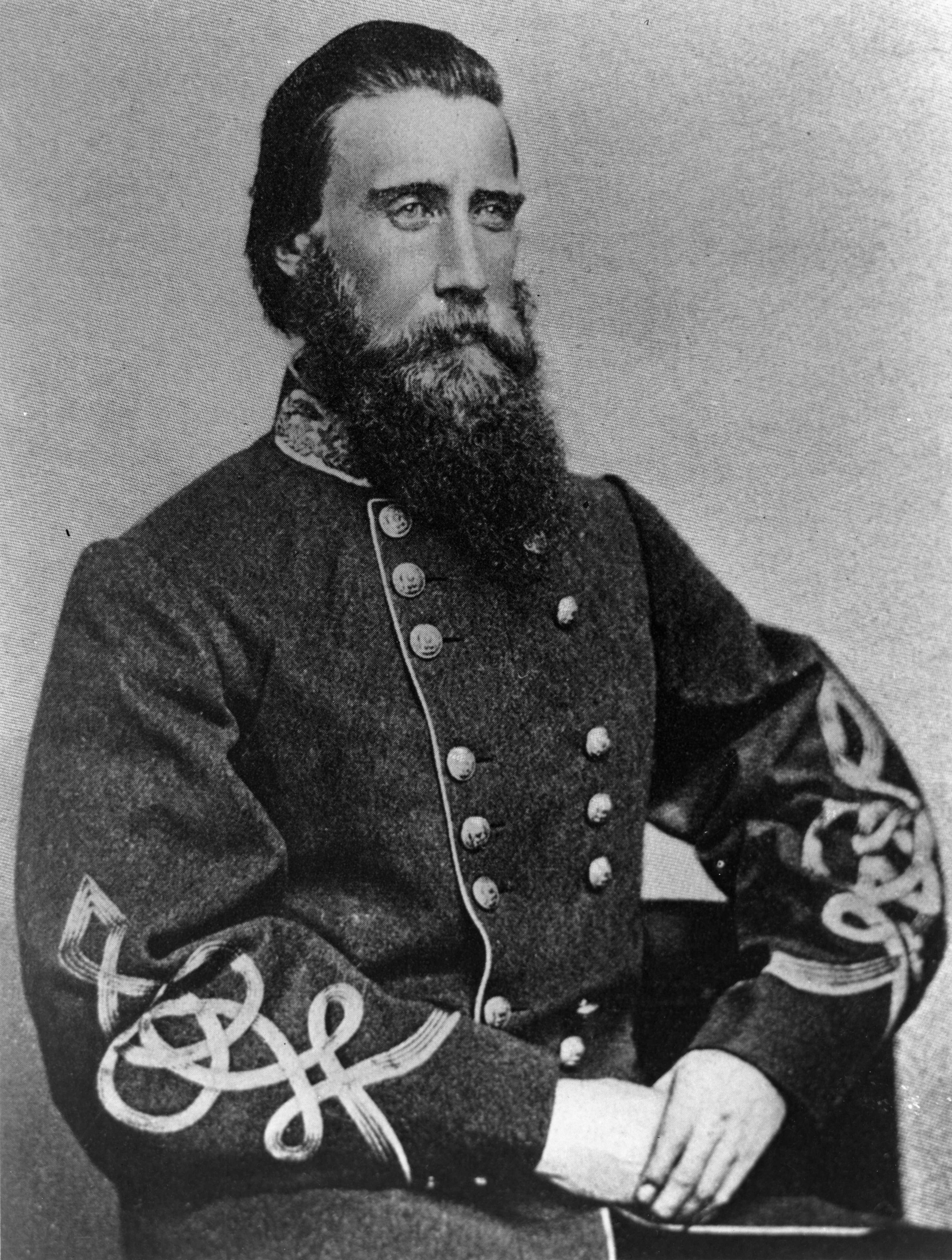
Lt. Gen. John Bell Hood

Battle of Chickamauga, actions of September 20

Note: see Chickamauga order of battle for the command structure of the Army of Tennessee at this time.

On September 9, the First Corps was transferred to the Department of Tennessee, except for Pickett's division and the brigade of "Tige" Anderson. The Tennessee rail hub at Chattanooga was the primary goal of both armies in the West, these being the Army of the Cumberland under Union Maj. Gen. Rosecrans and numbering nearly 60,000 men, and the Army of Tennessee led by Confederate Gen. Braxton Bragg and the First Corps along with additional reinforcements would constitute over 65,000 troops. To get to and reinforce Bragg's army, the First Corps would use 16 railroads on a nearly 800-mile (1,350 km) route through North and South Carolina to reach the Army of Tennessee, stationed in northern Georgia. This round-about route was necessary due to the different gauges of the surviving Southern rail system between the forces, and would take three weeks to complete. The lead elements of Longstreet's corps, three brigades of Maj. Gen. John Bell Hood's division, were grouped with a western division under Brig. Gen. Bushrod Johnson and opened the battle on September 18 by crossing Chickamauga Creek at Reed's Bridge. Since Longstreet had not yet arrived, Hood assumed command of the corps while Brig. Gen. Evander Law assumed command of Hood's division. The First Corps would fight in the same formation the next day on the Confederate left. On September 20, Longstreet arrived along with two brigades from McLaws's division. Since McLaws had not yet arrived, the brigades were led by Brig. Gen. Joseph B. Kershaw. Bragg used the arrival of Longstreet to reorganize his army into wings, with Longstreet commanding the left wing consisting of his own corps under Hood, Buckner's corps, and Hindman's division while Leonidas Polk assumed command of the right. The troops of the First Corps played an important role in the breakthrough Longstreet achieved on the 20th. This fight is considered the most significant Union defeat in the Western Theater, with total casualties on both sides exceeding 34,000.

=== Knoxville Campaign ===
Note: see for the command structure of Longstreet's Corps at this time.

November 4 - Longstreet leaves Chattanooga

November 6 - Battle of Big Creek, Rogersville - The Army of West Virginia attacks in support of Longstreet's efforts.

November 15 - Engagement at Ft. Dickerson.

November 16 - Battle of Campbell's Station.

November 17 - Longstreet lays siege to Knoxville

November 18 - Engagement at West Knoxville. Union General Sanders is mortally wounded.

November 25 - Engagement at Armstrong's Hill, South Knoxville.

November 28. Weather rainy and cold in Knoxville. General McLaws drives in the pickets at Fort Sanders that evening. A general alarm is sounded in Fort Sanders at 11:00 pm, but the expected attack fails to materialize. The defenders of the fort sleep on their guns in the mud under dog tents.

November 29. Assault on Fort Loudon / Sanders. At sunrise the Union troops in Ft. Loudon raise a large US garrison flag on a newly erected flagpole. The band plays Reveille and the National Anthem. Confederate artillery bombards the fort, followed by the Confederate infantry charge, which ends in disaster in 15 minutes. A truce is called to carry off the dead, wounded, and prisoners.

== Winter quarters 1863–64 ==
About an hour after the failed attack on Fort Sanders on November 29, a telegram from President Jefferson Davis arrived, informing Longstreet of Bragg's defeat at Chattanooga and directing the First Corps to rejoin the Army of Tennessee. At first Longstreet decided to leave the Knoxville area immediately, so he directed the wagon train to move rearward at once. Then two messages from Bragg came in, suggesting the First Corps should cross the mountain ranges into Georgia to reach the army retreating there. As Longstreet held councils of war with his senior officers, the logistical problems of crossing the mountains came to light, and it was decided to stay at Knoxville until Union reinforcements arrived then go into winter quarters near Bristol, Virginia.

On December 1 Confederate cavalry patrols captured an enemy courier, carrying a message for Burnside stating three columns had been sent to his aid. Longstreet acted on this information—later proved to be a ruse—and ordered his wagons started eastward under guard. The 15,000 infantrymen began to follow late in the day on December 4, marching in a heavy rain all night. Over the next four days the First Corps retreated toward Virginia, passing through Bean's Station and heading for Rogersville in Hawkins County, Tennessee, where Longstreet halted on December 9. The following day he received discretionary authority from Davis covering all soldiers in his region, and with this he recalled the cavalry units that had been ordered to Bragg in Georgia. Longstreet rested his command at Rogersville until December 13, when he learned of pursuing Union infantry and cavalry back at Bean's Station; he then decided to turn and attack them the next day.

=== Battle of Bean's Station ===
Battle of Bean's Station - December 14, 1863

Battle of Mossy Creek - December 29, 1863

== Civil War service, 1864 ==
Battle of Dandridge, Tn. - January 17, 1864

Battle of Fair Garden, Tn. - January 27, 1864

=== Overland Campaign ===
Note: see Wilderness order of battle for the command structure of the Army of Northern Virginia at this time.

At the start of the Overland Campaign, the First Corps was 25 miles (40 km) away guarding rail lines at Gordonsville when the rest of Lee's army engaged Meade's Army of the Potomac in the Battle of the Wilderness on May 5. Longstreet received orders telling him to reunite with the rest of the army and support A.P. Hill's Third Corps before 4 a.m. on May 4. By mid-day on May 6 the Third Corps was in danger of being swamped over by the Union II Corps when the First Corps arrived to fill in the gap created by the fight. Longstreet put in his men directly against the now-worn out II Corps and regained almost all of the ground lost in the battle so far, then pushed the II Corps a mile (1.6 km) further. Shortly after stabilizing the Confederate line, a Confederate engineer discovered an unfinished railroad bed which gave the Confederates access to the Union left flank. Longstreet organized a flanking force composed of four brigades drawn from his own First Corps and from the Third Corps. While the initial attack was successful in routing the Union flank, the Confederates quickly became confused in the dense thickets. At this time, Longstreet was seriously wounded in his neck by friendly fire. Command of the First Corps temporarily passed to Maj. Gen. Charles W. Field, who then reorganized the corps into a defensive line. On May 7, Lee decided to replace Field with Richard Anderson.

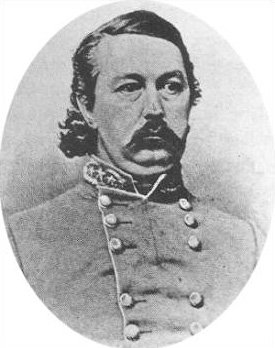
Maj. Gen. Charles W. Field

Note: see Spotsylvania order of battle for the command structure of the Army of Northern Virginia at this time.

The Battle of Spotsylvania Court House was fought May 8–21, along a trench line four miles long, in and around Spotsylvania, about 10 miles southeast of the Wilderness battlefields.

On the evening of May 7, Lee ordered Maj. Gen. Richard Anderson to move his corps to Spotsylvania Court House, believing that Grant was headed to the same place. He told Anderson to have his men on the move by three in the morning, but Anderson decided to move at ten that evening, a decision that would prove to help the Army of Northern Virginia considerably. At the same time Lee put Anderson in motion, Grant decided to move his army to the same location in hopes of drawing Lee out into the open and get between Lee and Richmond.

The First Corps had just arrived to Block House Bridge when Anderson was informed that Maj. Gen. J.E.B. Stuart was holding off Grant's infantry (elements of Warren's V Corps) on Brock Road and needed reinforcements. He sent the brigades of Henegan and Humphreys to his aid, and upon their arrival, Stuart deployed them along the crest of Laurel Hill, where they successfully held off the Federal advance. No sooner had Anderson sent his first two brigades off when he was approached by a courier from Maj. Gen. Fitzhugh Lee, who was engaged with Federal cavalry units of Brig. Gen. James H. Wilson, who had just broken through to the Court House. Anderson immediately sent the brigades of Bryan and Wofford, who are able to help Lee fend off the cavalrymen.

The First Corps would spend the majority of the battle defending against repeated assaults of Laurel Hill made by both V Corps infantry as well as units from Hancock's II Corps, and was not heavily involved in the fighting in and around the "Bloody Angle."

Note: see Cold Harbor order of battle for the command structure of the Army of Northern Virginia at this time.

== Civil War service, 1865 ==
=== Five Forks and Appomattox ===
Following Lt. Gen. A.P. Hill's death at Petersburg, the remnants of the Third Corps were merged into the First Corps on April 2.

== See also ==
- Second Corps, Army of Northern Virginia
- Third Corps, Army of Northern Virginia
- Fourth Corps, Army of Northern Virginia
- Cavalry Corps, Army of Northern Virginia
