= Second Battle of Winchester =

1863 battle of the American Civil War

Coordinates: 39.1847°N 78.1671°W

- Part of the American Civil War
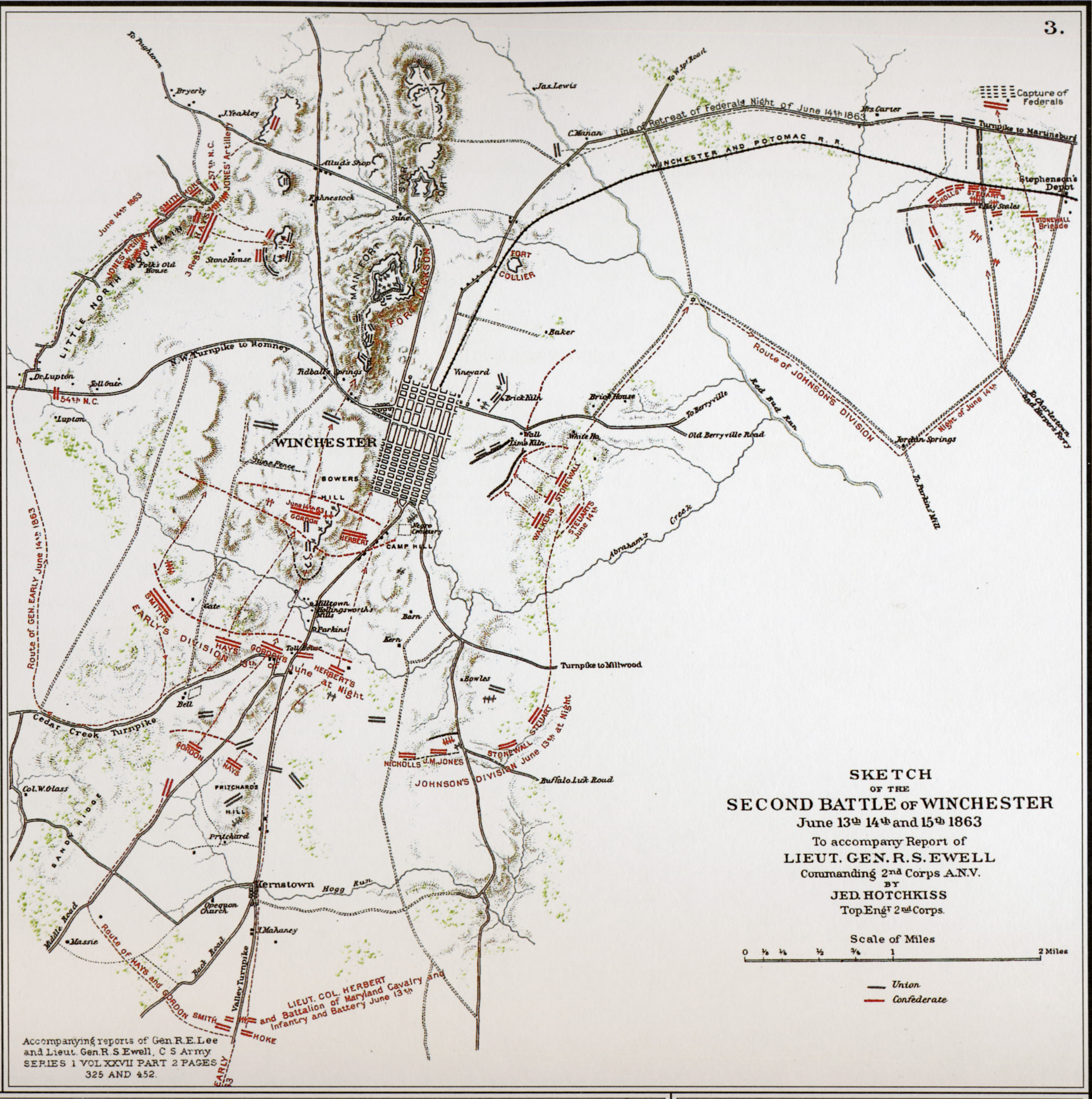
- Sketch of the Second Battle of Winchester, by Jedediah Hotchkiss.
Date	June 13–15, 1863
Location	Frederick County and Winchester, Virginia
Result	Confederate victory

Belligerents
United States (Union)	(Confederate States of America) CSA (Confederacy)

Commanders and leaders
Robert H. Milroy	Richard S. Ewell

Units involved
2nd Division, VIII Corps	Second Corps, Army of Northern Virginia

Strength
7,000	12,500

Casualties and losses
4,443 (95 killed 348 wounded 4,000 missing or captured)	269 (47 killed 219 wounded 3 missing)

The Second Battle of Winchester was fought between June 13 and June 15, 1863, in Frederick County and Winchester, Virginia as part of the Gettysburg campaign during the American Civil War. As Confederate Lieutenant General Richard S. Ewell moved north through the Shenandoah Valley in the direction of Pennsylvania, his corps defeated the Union Army garrison commanded by Major General Robert H. Milroy, who had already received numerous orders to retreat, that he had ignored. The rebel army stormed the heavily fortified union positions around the city, prompting the unionist army to retreat to a fort overlooking the city. This was abandoned in the evening. The rebel army closely pursued the retreating union army, intercepting its line of retreat and causing heavy casualties and chaos among the retreating baggage train and columns of the Union army. A large number of union soldiers and stores were captured in the ensuing rout, though the union commander escaped, in what became one of the worst defeats the union had suffered in the war, prompting the severe censure of the Union general Milroy.

== Background ==
After the Battle of Brandy Station on June 9, 1863, Confederate General Robert E. Lee ordered Ewell's 19,000-man Second Corps, Army of Northern Virginia, to clear the lower Shenandoah Valley of Union opposition so that Lee's army could proceed on its invasion of Pennsylvania, shielded by the Blue Ridge Mountains from Union interference.

Union General-in-chief Henry Wager Halleck expressed great concerns about the Middle Department's defensive strategy for its primary objective of protecting the Baltimore and Ohio Railroad corridor. Brig. Gen. Benjamin Franklin Kelley, commander of the "railroad division" (Department of Harper's Ferry), had been advised that his plan along with Maj. Gen. Milroy's and Maj. Gen. Robert C. Schenck's (Commander of the Middle Department) was unsound:

Headquarters Eighth Army Corps,
Baltimore, January 5, 1863.

The following telegram was received to-day from Major-General Halleck, General-in-Chief:

"Major-General Schenck: No attempt should be made to hold Winchester against a large force of the enemy ..."

General Halleck does not quite agree with General Schenck and yourself as to the policy of covering and protecting the road principally by keeping up advanced posts at Leesburg, Winchester and Romney.

— WM. D. WHIPPLE, Assistant Adjutant-General.

== Opposing forces ==
=== Ewell's Second Corps, Army of Northern Virginia ===
Lt. Gen. Richard S. Ewell's force of 19,000 consisted of:

- The division of Maj. Gen. Jubal A. Early, with the brigades of Brig. Gens. Harry T. Hays (Louisiana Tigers), William "Extra Billy" Smith, John B. Gordon, and Isaac E. Avery
- The division of Maj. Gen. Robert E. Rodes, with the brigades of Brig. Gens. Junius Daniel, George P. Doles, Alfred Iverson, Stephen Dodson Ramseur, and Col. Edward A. O'Neal
- The division of Maj. Gen. Edward "Allegheny" Johnson, with the brigades of Brig. Gens. George H. Steuart, James A. Walker (Stonewall Brigade), John M. Jones, and Col. Jesse M. Williams (Nicholls' Brigade)
- The unattached 1st Maryland Battalion
- The cavalry brigade of Brig. Gen. Albert G. Jenkins
- Corps Artillery Reserve under Col. J. Thompson Brown

=== 2nd Division, VIII Corps, Middle Department ===
Maj. Gen. Robert H. Milroy's force of 6,900 consisted of three infantry brigades, under Brig. Gen. Washington L. Elliot and Cols. Andrew T. McReynolds and William G. Ely, and two small outposts northwest of town under Col. Joseph W. Keifer.

== Preliminary maneuvers ==
=== Army of Northern Virginia (A.N.Va.) movement ===
Ewell's movements were coordinated as part of an overall orchestration of the Army of Northern Virginia into position for crossing the Potomac River toward Pennsylvania by using the Blue Ridge Mountains as a screen. This strategic offensive maneuver was put into effect on 3 June, when Gen. Robert E. Lee stated his intent to "transfer the scene of hostilities beyond the Potomac", by moving in a concealed fashion down the Shenandoah Valley.

Longstreet's First Corps (via Snickers Gap) and Hill's Third Corps (via Ashby's Gap) paralleled the movements of Second Corps to the east through Berryville, Virginia, and Stuart's Cavalry Division was under orders for careful synchronization and screening for Lee's Army by conducting demonstrations and screening actions along the ANV's right flank east of the Blue Ridge.

==== Ewell's Second Corps movements ====
June 4–11
The Second Corps left Hamilton's Crossing on 4 June and marched to Culpeper, Virginia, arriving 7 June. Receiving intelligence that Union forces had crossed the Rappahannock River in force, Lee ordered Ewell northeast to Brandy Station, Virginia, on 9 June, to support Major General J.E.B. Stuart's actions in the Battle of Brandy Station, only to find the Union forces already retreating. Ewell resumed the march on 10 June, and on 11 June Early and Johnson's Divisions marched via the Sperryville turnpike to Gaines crossroads, while Rodes' Division took the Richmond road toward Flint Hill. On the evening of the 11th, after consulting with General Lee, Ewell met with Early, Johnson and the Second Corps topographer, Jedediah Hotchkiss, to discuss approach routes, and a general plan for the Second Corps' objective to capture Winchester and Martinsburg.

June 12
The Second Corps passed through Chester's Gap southeast of Front Royal, Virginia, approaching along the Front Royal Pike (modern U.S. 522). There the Second Corps was joined by its cavalry brigade under the command of Brig. Gen. Albert G. Jenkins. Ewell consulted with Early and Jenkins to form his corps-level plan of action, composed of splitting the corps into two basic independent movements:

- North intercept & cut-off maneuver to Berryville & Martinsburg:
  - Units: Rodes' Division and Jenkins' cavalry brigade
  - Direction of movement: detached north through Berryville, Virginia to Martinsburg, West Virginia
  - Ewell's objective: To capture, if possible, McReynolds' force of 1,800 men stationed at Berryville and then to press north to Martinsburg
- Main strike maneuver to Winchester:
  - Units: Early's Division, Johnson's Division and the 16th Virginia Cavalry Battalion (Maj. James H. Nounnan) of Jenkins' Brigade
  - Direction of movement: Northwest to Winchester, Virginia
  - Ewell's objective: To attack the fortifications in Winchester and Milroy's force of 6,000 to 8,000 men

By the end of the day on 12 June, Rodes' Division was 5 miles (8 km) north of Front Royal, encamped at Stone Bridge, while Johnson's Division arrived at Cedarville, and Early's Division was encamped near the Shenandoah River.

=== Milroy's defensive preparations ===
==== Berryville outpost ====
By April, four months into his occupation of Winchester, Milroy's loose grip on Confederate raiding in the lower Shenandoah Valley caused enough concern for the Middle Department commander, Schenck, to directly order Milroy to post one brigade further to the east at Berryville. It offered a base of operations to patrol crossings of the Shenandoah River and lookout for Confederates raiding in and out of both Snicker's Gap and Ashby's Gap in the Blue Ridge Mountains on the eastern border of the valley. In response, Milroy posted McReynolds' brigade in Berryville, with orders to evacuate to Winchester upon the signal of the firing of one of the heavy artillery guns.

==== Cavalry defenses ====
Milroy stationed pickets and videttes around Winchester, but they were positioned too close to Winchester, due to bushwacking of his patrols. Therefore, Milroy had practically no surveillance of the situation around himself. His caution in posting outlying videttes was also perhaps due to the severe losses he incurred in trying to suppress various Confederate cavalry raids that kept occurring in his district, such as on 26 February, when he sent the 1st New York Cavalry and the 13th Pennsylvania Cavalry out to pursue raiders. They met the 7th and 11th Virginia Cavalry, under the command of Col. O. R. Funsten, and suffered a devastating loss of 197 Federal cavalry, including 12 officers. Milroy also often recorded many other grand-sounding cavalry incursions supposedly capturing or killing many of Colonel John S. Mosby's rangers in the weeks and months leading up to June; however, the records of Mosby's Rangers do not corroborate or mention most of these engagements Milroy's farthest outlying videttes to the south were located at or near Parkins Mill Battery at the Opequon Creek crossing, a mere 4 miles (6 km) south of Winchester. Other reports of Federal videttes to the west of Winchester were never seen or encountered by Confederate forces.

==== Fortifications ====
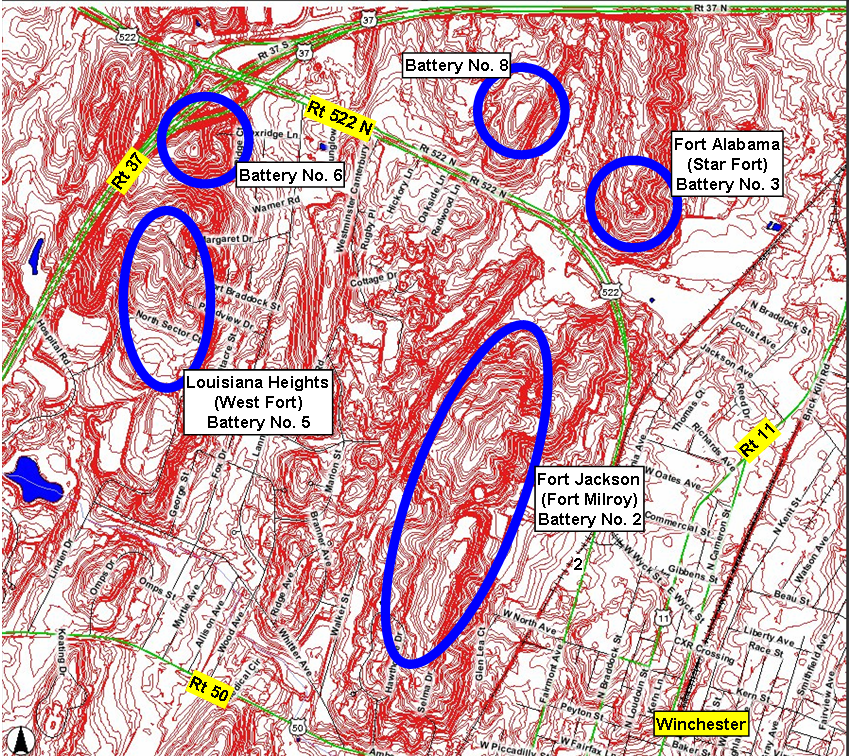
MajGen. Milroy's defensive fortifications in Winchester, Virginia, in June 1863

Winchester was heavily fortified by forts and lunettes circumferencing the town, as well as along the outlying turnpike routes entering town. Within Winchester, Milroy constructed or improved ten defensive fortifications, numbered Battery No. 1 through Battery No. 10, making improvements on many pre-existing forts and fortifications left by prior Confederate and Federal occupations. The fortifications were linked in places with roads and trenches, and the use of these were a key to Milroy's defensive strategy. Through a combination of retreating his forces into the defensive works, and then using his long-range heavy artillery, Milroy felt that he could hold out for weeks (if not months) against any force that may be thrown against him.

During the battle, Milroy concentrated his forces on the ridges west of town in his three highest and most improved forts connected by trenches. The larger forts were named:

- Battery No. 2 - Fort Milroy: Originally built by Confederate troops and called the "fortification on the heights" or the "Main Fort", this was improved under Maj. Gen. Banks and called "Fort Garibaldi" by the 39th New York regiment. The fort was improved extensively by Milroy's troops and held 14 guns, including heavy artillery, and renamed Fort Milroy (but then renamed Fort Jackson after the battle).
- Battery No. 3 - Star Fort: This fort was built by Federal troops in 1862, improved by Milroy, and equipped with 8 guns. (Renamed Fort Alabama).
- Battery No. 5 - West Fort: This was a 4-gun lunette located due west of Fort Milroy (later renamed Louisiana Heights)

The lesser fortifications initially used, but abandoned by Milroy during the course of the battle were:

- Battery No. 1: A linear entrenchment-lunette along Bower's Hill south of Fort Milroy (Battery 2).
- Battery No. 4: A large star lunette with entrenchments and minor lunettes containing 6 guns, located due north of Star Fort (Battery 3) along the same ridge line (north of modern VA 37).
- Battery No. 6: A small lunette with 2 guns on a hill peak located in between West Fort (Battery 5) and Battery 7 (modern exit of VA 37 onto VA 522).
- Battery No. 7: A large lunette and trench line with 8 guns on Apple Pie Ridge west of Apple Pie Ridge Road (modern James Wood High School).
- Battery No. 8: A grouping of two redans downhill west of Star Fort (Battery 3).
- Battery No. 9: Unknown location.
- Battery No. 10: this was the Confederate Fort Collier built on the east side of the Martinsburg turnpike on the north end of town.
- Fortification at Opequon Crossing (Parkins Mill Battery): A lunette or redan 4 miles south of Winchester at the Opequon River crossing on the Front Royal turnpike (modern VA 522).

For further information see:The Occupation of Major General Robert Milroy

== Main battle ==
=== June 13: initial engagements ===
==== Ewell's attack plan ====
Ewell and his generals were well acquainted with the tactical situation in Winchester, having fought through here under Lt. Gen. Jackson during the First Battle of Winchester, and understood the layout of the various fortifications and terrain masking opportunities on the west side of town. Therefore, Ewell further split his main attack force of two divisions into two basic flanking movements:

- West (Left) Flanking Movement
  - Units: Early's Division, Brown's artillery battalion, 1st Maryland Infantry Battalion and the Baltimore Light Artillery
  - Direction: West to Newton, on the Valley Pike
  - Ewell's objective: Approach Winchester from the southwest, and seek flanking avenues of approach from the west and northwest ridges of town
- East (Right) Flanking Movement
  - Units: Johnson's Division, 16th Virginia cavalry battalion
  - Direction: Northwest to Winchester on the Front Royal Pike
  - Ewell's objective: Perform demonstrations moving north along the east side of Winchester to "divert attention" from Early's movements

==== Johnson's Division advances on the Front Royal Pike ====
Johnson's division, while moving northwest on the Front Royal Pike, drove back Federal pickets at the Opequon River crossing (Parkins Mill Battery) around 8:30 a.m., and engaged in cavalry skirmishes at Hoge Run around 9:30 a.m. Johnson's advance stalled under fire from Fort Milroy's heavy guns shortly before noon, and skirmishing and artillery engagements commended afterward with Federal artillery located on the hill near Hollinsworth Mill. Johnson held his position at that point to synchronize with the arrival of Early's Division.

==== Early's Division advances on the Valley Pike ====
Ewell ordered Early's Division to cross west via Ninevah to Newtown and move north on the Valley Pike. Arriving at the outskirts of Kernstown light infantry and artillery engagements commenced around noon. Late in the afternoon, around 4 p.m., Early pushed back Federal skirmishers at the Valley Pike toll-gate and after minor engagements, the Federal forces retreated north of Abrams Creek.

==== Milroy concentrates into his forts ====
Milroy, despite the engagements up to point, still had no idea that he was facing the entire Second Corps of Lee's Army. Milroy concentrated all of his forces in the three forts defending the town. Having feared exactly this type of a scenario, General-in-chief Henry W. Halleck had asked Schenck to order Milroy to fall back from Winchester to Harpers Ferry. Although Schenck had discussed evacuation with Milroy, he left no clear direction for Milroy to evacuate, since Milroy had convinced Schenck that his defensive position in Winchester was strong. Milroy had previously decided to disregard concerns from Washington because he was confident that the strength of his fortifications would allow his garrison to withstand an assault or a siege.

==== Rodes' Division advances on Berryville and Martinsburg ====
Ewell, based on good intelligence from sources in the lower Valley, had foreseen that Milroy's only escape route could be successfully blocked and had already anticipated by having Rodes' Division advance on Martinsburg via Berryville to cut off Milroy's expected retreat route, per his plans from 11 June. That afternoon, having reached Berryville, Rodes' Division and Jenkins' cavalry brigade attempted to capture McReynolds' Brigade, but, alerted to the Confederate movement by the firing of signal guns by Milroy's main force in Winchester, McReynolds withdrew to Winchester, where his force occupied the Star Fort north of town. Nevertheless, the Confederates were able to capture portions of the Federal supply train at nearby Bunker Hill, West Virginia, along with 75 prisoners. Subsequently, Confederate forces cut the telegram line into Winchester, eliminating Milroy's only line of communication, and by sundown on 13 June Rodes' Division had reached Martinsburg, capturing the town along with five Federal artillery pieces. The night of 13 June a storm arose, and a strong rain drenched Winchester and the lower Valley all night long.

=== June 14: Ewell's double-flank Attack ===
==== Early's left flanking march to Apple Pie Ridge ====
At dawn on June 14, Gordon's Brigade swept forward to capture Bower's Hill with little resistance. Johnson extended his line to the right against very light opposition. There was fitful skirmishing in the streets of Winchester. Early and Ewell conferred on Bower's Hill and decided on a flanking strategy. Gordon's Brigade and two batteries were left on Bower's Hill, while Early led his three other brigades back to Cedar Creek Grade, west beyond Apple Pie Ridge where it was out of view of Federal fortifications, then north over Cloverdale Plantation to Walnut Grove. His column was accompanied by 20 guns. While Early made this march, Johnson advanced a line of skirmishers on the right to occupy the Federals' attention, providing diversionary skirmishing all day from 10 a.m. until about 4 p.m. The Confederate batteries on Bower's Hill opened up, touching off a duel with the Federal guns in Fort Milroy. By mid-afternoon, Early's force had gained a position opposite West Fort on Apple Pie Ridge. Eight guns were positioned on the Brierly Farm northwest of the fort, while 12 guns were placed in an orchard southwest of the fort, but by this time the field had quieted. Within the Federal forts, Milroy and his sub-commanders believed that the Confederates had been repulsed from Winchester, still seemingly unaware they were now totally surrounded and cut off, with the additional problem of an entire division (Rodes') occupying their primary escape route north.

==== Early's attack on West Fort ====
About 6 p.m., Early's artillery opened fire on West Fort. The twenty guns fired for 45 minutes, while Hays stealthily advanced his Louisiana brigade through the corn and wheat fields at the base of Apple Pie Ridge. On command, the brigade rushed forward across 300 yards of open fields and swept upward into the works. After a brief hand-to-hand struggle, the Federal defenders abandoned the works, retreating to Fort Milroy, while their own captured artillery were turned around and used against them. Hays was supported in the attack by Smith's and Avery's brigade, and Early consolidated his line on West Fort (or Flint) Ridge, but darkness prevented further gains. An artillery duel continued until long after dark. After the battle, Ewell christened West Fort Ridge as "Louisiana Heights" in honor of Hays's brigade. That evening, Ewell located his Corps Headquarters at the Bowers' House, while Early's Division pounded away at Milroy's main fort in an artillery duel well into the night.

==== Johnson's right flanking march toward Stephenson's Depot ====
Ewell assumed that Milroy might attempt a retreat during the night and ordered Johnson to prevent his escape by marching north and cutting off escape to the east-north-east via the Charles Town Road, a potential escape route that could possibly bypass the position of Rodes' Division in the north. Therefore, about 9 p.m., Johnson (with Steuart's and Williams's brigades and 8 guns) commenced a night march north to Berryville Pike and west to Jordan Springs Road, where he turned north toward Stephenson's Depot, a train stop on the Winchester and Potomac Railroad near the intersection of the Martinsburg Pike and the Charles Town Road. About midnight, the Stonewall Brigade disengaged and joined the rear of the column, leaving one brigade (Jones) astride the Berryville Pike east of town.

==== Milroy retreats up the Martinsburg Pike ====
Also at 9 p.m., at a formal council of war, Milroy and his officers made the decision to try to "cut their way through" to Harpers Ferry on the old Charles Town Road, the very same road that Confederate Johnson and his division were marching toward to cut off. All of the cannons were spiked and their carriages destroyed. Shortly after midnight, the Federal soldiers pulled their colors and left their works so quietly that Early's Confederates did not know they were gone until morning. The column massed in the low ground between Star Fort and Fort Milroy, then moved down along the railroad line and the Valley Pike toward the Charles Town crossroad, just south of Stephenson's Depot.

=== June 15: Johnson's attack at Stephenson's Depot ===
Near dawn on June 15, Johnson's skirmishers encountered the head of Milroy's retreating column near the intersection of the Valley Pike and old Charles Town road. Milroy faced his column to the right on the pike and prepared to fight his way out of a "murderous trap" by enveloping the enemy. Johnson deployed his regiments along Milburn Road as they came up and advanced to the railroad and placed two guns on either side of the Charles Town Road railroad bridge. The rest of the artillery was deployed on the heights east of Milburn Road. As it grew light, Federal forces made several desperate but uncoordinated attacks against the bridge and railroad embankment. The Confederates were being steadily reinforced and repulsed each attempt. Nicholl's Brigade crushed the final Federal attack and the Stonewall Brigade then came up in line of battle north of the road and advanced to cut the Valley Pike. This was the final blow; and some remaining Federal regiments hoisted the white flag. At some point Milroy's horse was shot out from under him, and the division as a whole scattered in various directions to the northwest, north, and northeast, with some small groups even managing to escape covertly to the southeast toward and through Manassas Gap into Federally controlled territory.

== Aftermath ==
=== Casualty reports ===
Both Union and Confederate Official Record reports on casualties are practically identical. Ewell reported:

- "The fruits of this victory were 23 pieces of artillery (nearly all rifled), 4,000 prisoners, 300 loaded wagons, more than 300 horses, and quite a large amount of commissary and quartermaster's stores."

This prisoner count seems to include the capture of all the Federal wounded hospitalized in Winchester, since Ewell's topographer, Jedediah Hotchkiss counts about 2,000 prisoners from the town, along with an estimate of about 1,500 that escaped to Harper's Ferry, along with more prisoners captured during pursuits from the Confederate cavalry. When Milroy appeared later in Harpers Ferry, he was immediately placed under arrest. Shortly after Schenck reported Milroy's arrest had expired, Aide-de-Camp Capt. Frederick A. Palmer, 18th Connecticut Infantry, reported in an extensive and detailed table of all units, summarized:

- Killed: 7 Officers, 88 Enlisted men, Wounded: 12 Officers, 336 Enlisted men, Captured or missing: 144 Officers, 3856 Enlisted men.

Thus, while Ewell reports 4,000 captured, the VIII Corps reports 144 Officers and 3856 Enlisted men missing or captured, which also adds to 4,000. Captain Palmer summarized the Union losses at a total of 4,443 for 1st, 2nd and 3rd Brigades from the 2nd Division, VIII Corps including all independent attachments.

Johnson's Division, alone, captured 3,500 prisoners in the action at Stephenson's Depot, and this is not surprising, since this is the only major engagement of the war in which an entire division column was attacked at night while route-marching on a road. General Johnson claimed to have taken 30 prisoners "with his opera glass!" as well as "11 stands of colors, 175 horses, and arms and accoutrements of every description".

Some casualty estimates range lower. Eicher writes that Confederate casualties were 269 (47 killed, 219 wounded, 3 missing); Union 3,801 (95 killed, 348 wounded, 3,358 missing or captured). Difficult to account for in the records are additional numbers of captured Union soldiers from the many hospitals in Winchester.

The casualty ratio in this engagement of two divisions against one was an historically low 269 to 4,443 or 0.06. Confederate artillerist Major Robert Stiles, to describe this, wrote: "This battle of Winchester ... was one of the most perfect pieces of work the Army of Northern Virginia ever did."

=== A division lost, two battalions gained ===
Milroy and his staff, his cavalry, and other small units, totaling about 1,200 escaped to Harpers Ferry. Additionally, in the days following the battle "2,700 more turned up in Bloody Run, Pennsylvania". Milroy's command ceased to exist, and the scattered remnants of what was the 2nd Division, VIII Corps were assimilated back into the Middle Department, while Milroy was placed under arrest. The Confederates had merely hoped to re-supply and forage, but with the easy capture of Winchester, they captured enough artillery and horses to equip a battalion of infantry and cavalry, including 28 guns (23 at Winchester and 5 at Martinsburg) and 300 horses in total. Additionally, the Confederates captured a great quantity of food, clothing, small arms ammunition and medical stores in Winchester.

Following this battle, a Court of Inquiry was held, and both President Abraham Lincoln and Halleck desired to know who disobeyed the orders to "evacuate Winchester". President Abraham Lincoln wrote to Milroy:

Major General Milroy

I have never doubted your courage and devotion to the cause... but... I have scarcely seen anything from you at any time that did not contain imputations against your superiors and a chafing against acting the part they have assigned you. You have constantly urged the idea that you were persecuted because you did not come from West Point, and you repeat it in these letters. This, my dear general, is, I fear, the rock on which you have split...

— Abraham Lincoln, 29 June 1863

The nature of the inquiry was later changed from investigating who disobeyed orders to evacuate Winchester, to the discovery of the events and nature of the retreat from Winchester. Milroy was exonerated and claimed that his brilliant defensive action at Winchester was instrumental in causing the timing of the Battle of Gettysburg, leading to the overall Union victory for the campaign. Despite this, Halleck insisted that Milroy not be given any more commands.

=== Contribution to Lee's Gettysburg campaign ===
The victory at Second Winchester cleared the Valley of Federal troops and opened the door for Lee's second invasion of the North. The capturing of ample supplies justified Lee's conceptual plan to provision his army on the march. The Federal defeat stunned the North, and Secretary of War Edwin M. Stanton called for additional militia to be federalized. Shortly afterwards, President Lincoln requested 100,000 volunteers to repel the threatened invasion. Several fleeing members of the scattered 87th Pennsylvania hastily tramped back to their homes near Gettysburg and in adjoining York County, Pennsylvania, spreading news to local officials that the Confederates were now in the Valley in strength, with apparent designs on invading Pennsylvania. Gov. Andrew Curtin of Pennsylvania, in response to these reports and other military intelligence, called for 50,000 volunteers to protect the Keystone State.

=== Ewell's followup ===
Immediately following the battle, Ewell dispatched the entire Corps cavalry brigade under Jenkins on a raid to Chambersburg, Pennsylvania, to forage and reconnoiter. Ewell placed his Second Corps Headquarters about 3 miles north of Winchester and then at Mr. Boyd's house near Bunker's Hill. The captured flag of Fort Milroy was used to create a new Confederate flag, and Ewell and Early attended a christening ceremony in which the new flag was hosted, and the fort officially renamed "Fort Jackson" in honor of the recently slain former Second Corps commander. Topographer Jedediah Hotchkiss then commenced an all day survey, creating his now famous map of the battle which appears at the head of this article.

=== Leadership contribution ===
Jubal Early's leadership in this battle was superb. Later, Lee had the utmost confidence in Early, ultimately giving him not just the Confederate Second Corps, but a new Valley District army to try again, in 1864, the distracting demonstration invasion of the United States that Lee had always dreamed of. Early succeeded, where Lee failed twice at Sharpsburg and Gettysburg, and shelled Fort Stevens in Washington, D.C.

== Medals of Honor ==
During the Second Battle of Winchester, two Union enlisted men and one officer received the Medal of Honor for their actions.

- 2nd Lt. James R. Durham, 12th West Virginia Infantry
- Musician John T. Patterson, 122nd Ohio Infantry
- Pvt. Elbridge Robinson, 122nd Ohio Infantry

== See also ==
- Gettysburg campaign
- Winchester in the American Civil War
- Flanking maneuver
