= Charles Tracy =

Charles Tracy may refer to:

- Charles Tracy (art historian) (1938–2024), British scholar
- Charles H. Tracy (1833–1911), Union Army soldier
- Charles Tracey (1847–1905), U.S. Representative from New York
