= Battle of Spotsylvania Court House =

1864 battle of the American Civil War

- Part of the American Civil War
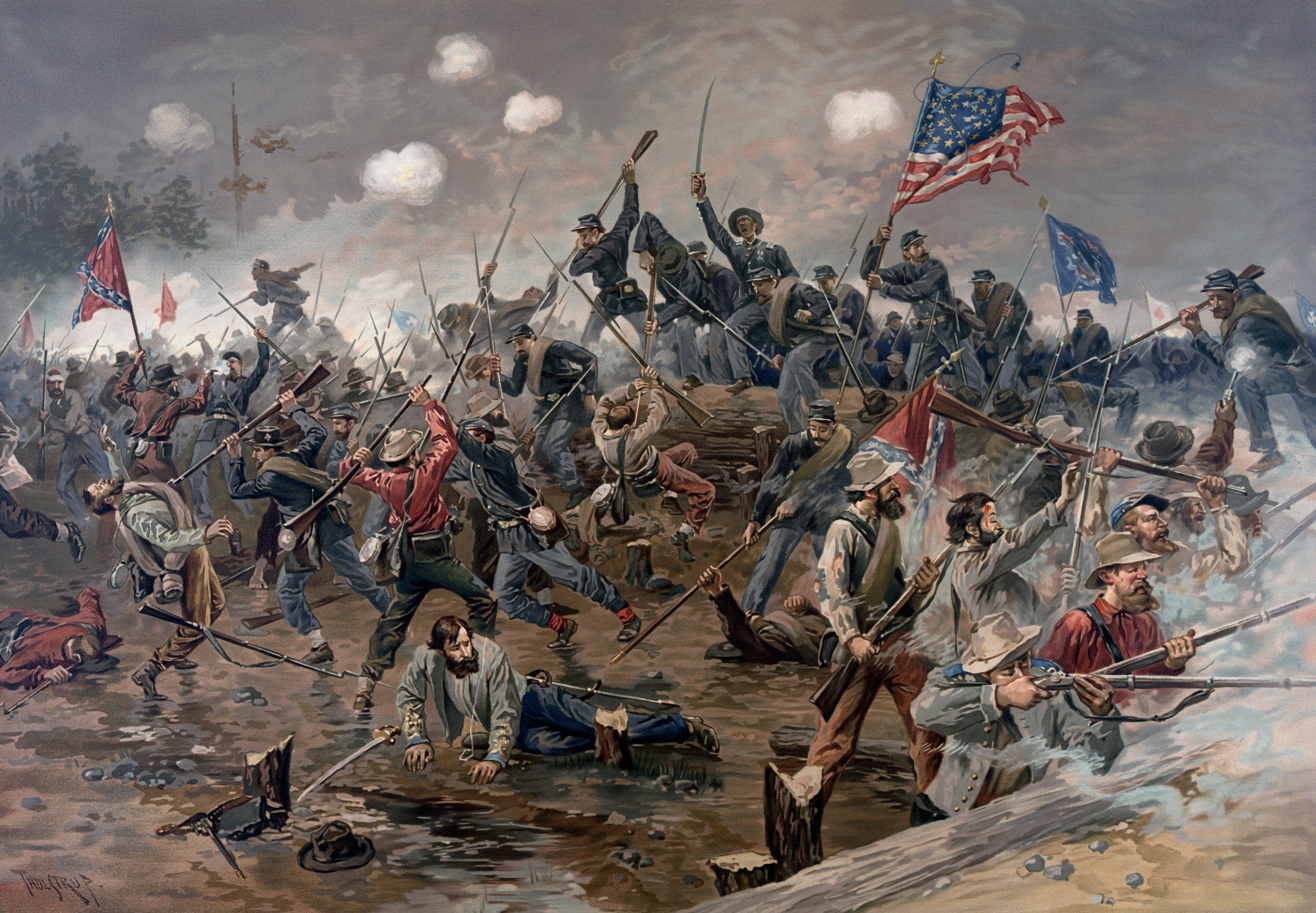
- 1887 illustration of the battle
Date	May 9–21, 1864
Location	Spotsylvania Courthouse, Virginia 38°13′27″N 77°35′53″W
Result	Inconclusive

Belligerents
United States	Confederate States

Commanders and leaders
Ulysses S. Grant; George Meade: John Sedgwick †	Robert E. Lee

Units involved
Army of the Potomac (Note: Organization of the forces operating against Richmond, on the morning of May 5, 1864.); IX Corps (Note: This Army Corps was under direct orders of Grant until May 24, 1864, when it was assigned to the Army of the Potomac.)	Army of Northern Virginia

Strength
108,000–115,400	52,000–63,000

Casualties and losses
Total: 18,399 2,725 killed 13,416 wounded 2,258 captured or missing (Note: Return of Casualties in the Union forces, Battle of Spotsylvania Court-House, May 8–21, 1864 (Recapitulation))	Total: 12,687 1,515 killed 5,414 wounded 5,758 captured or missing

The Battle of Spotsylvania Court House, sometimes more simply referred to as the Battle of Spotsylvania (or the 19th-century spelling Spottsylvania), was the second major battle in Lt. Gen. Ulysses S. Grant and Maj. Gen. George G. Meade's 1864 Overland Campaign of the American Civil War. Following the bloody but inconclusive Battle of the Wilderness, Grant's army disengaged from Confederate General Robert E. Lee's army and moved to the southeast, attempting to lure Lee into battle under more favorable conditions. Elements of Lee's army beat the Union army to the critical crossroads of the Spotsylvania Court House in Spotsylvania County, Virginia, and began entrenching. Fighting occurred on and off from May 8 through May 21, 1864, as Grant tried various schemes to break the Confederate line. In the end, the battle was tactically inconclusive, but both sides declared victory. The Confederacy declared victory because they were able to hold their defenses. The United States declared victory because the Union offensive continued and Lee's army suffered losses that could not be replaced. With almost 32,000 casualties on both sides, Spotsylvania was the costliest battle of the campaign.

On May 8, Union Maj. Gens. Gouverneur K. Warren and John Sedgwick (who was shot and killed during the battle on May 9) unsuccessfully attempted to dislodge the Confederates under Maj. Gen. Richard H. Anderson from Laurel Hill, a position that was blocking them from Spotsylvania Court House. On May 10, Grant ordered attacks across the Confederate line of earthworks, which by now extended over 4 miles (6.4 km), including a prominent salient known as the Mule Shoe. Although the Union troops failed again at Laurel Hill, an innovative assault attempt by Col. Emory Upton against the Mule Shoe showed promise.

Grant used Upton's assault technique on a much larger scale on May 12 when he ordered the 15,000 men of Maj. Gen. Winfield Scott Hancock's corps to assault the Mule Shoe. Hancock was initially successful, but the Confederate leadership rallied and repulsed his incursion. Attacks by Maj. Gen. Horatio Wright on the western edge of the Mule Shoe, which became known as the "Bloody Angle", involved almost 24 hours of desperate hand-to-hand fighting, some of the most intense of the Civil War. Supporting attacks by Warren and by Maj. Gen. Ambrose Burnside were unsuccessful.

Grant repositioned his lines in another attempt to engage Lee under more favorable conditions and launched a final attack by Hancock on May 18, which made no progress. A reconnaissance in force by Confederate Lt. Gen. Richard S. Ewell at Harris farm on May 19 was a costly and pointless failure. On May 21, Grant disengaged from the Confederate Army and started southeast on another maneuver to turn Lee's right flank, as the Overland Campaign continued and led to the Battle of North Anna.

== Background ==
=== Military situation ===
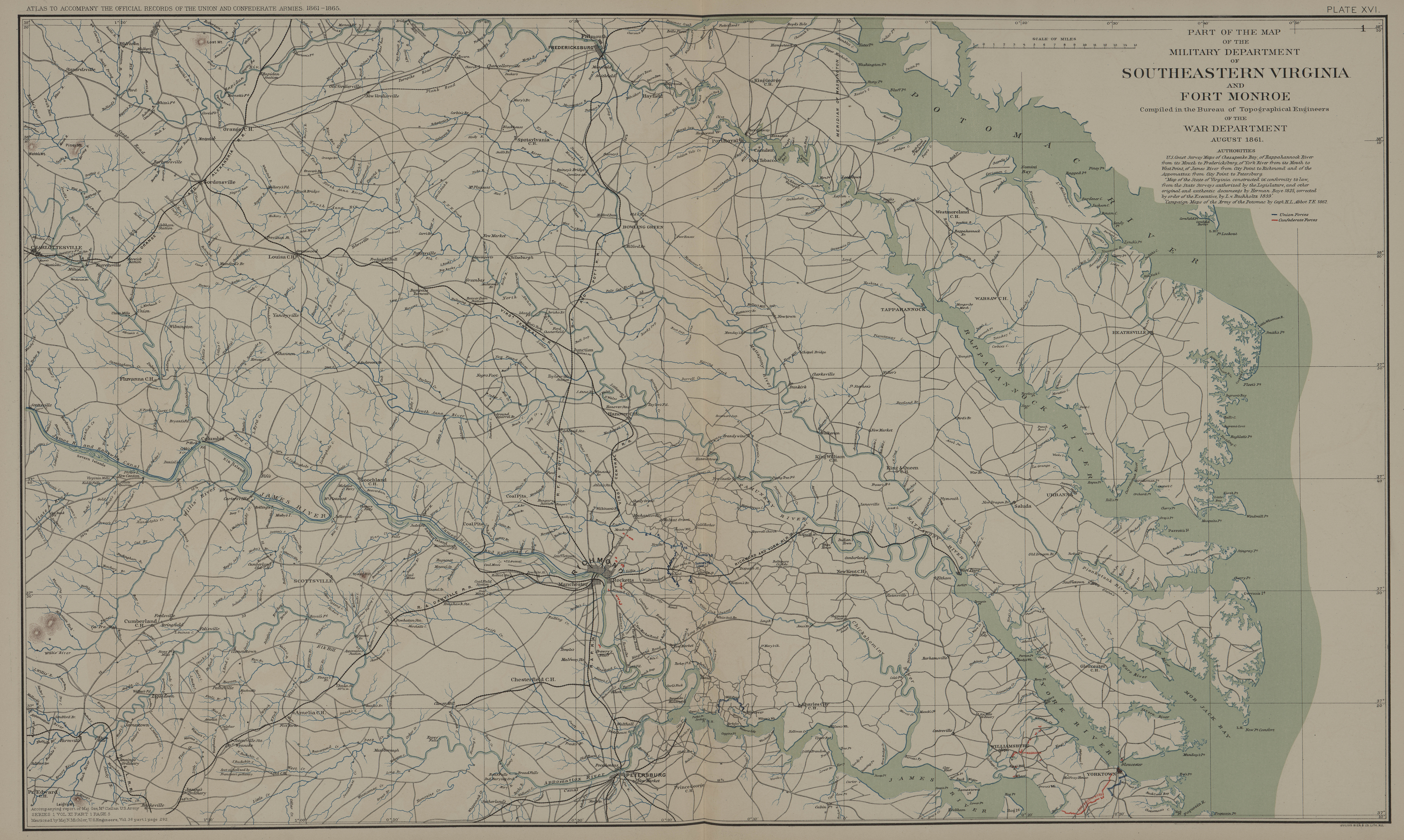
Map of Southeastern Virginia

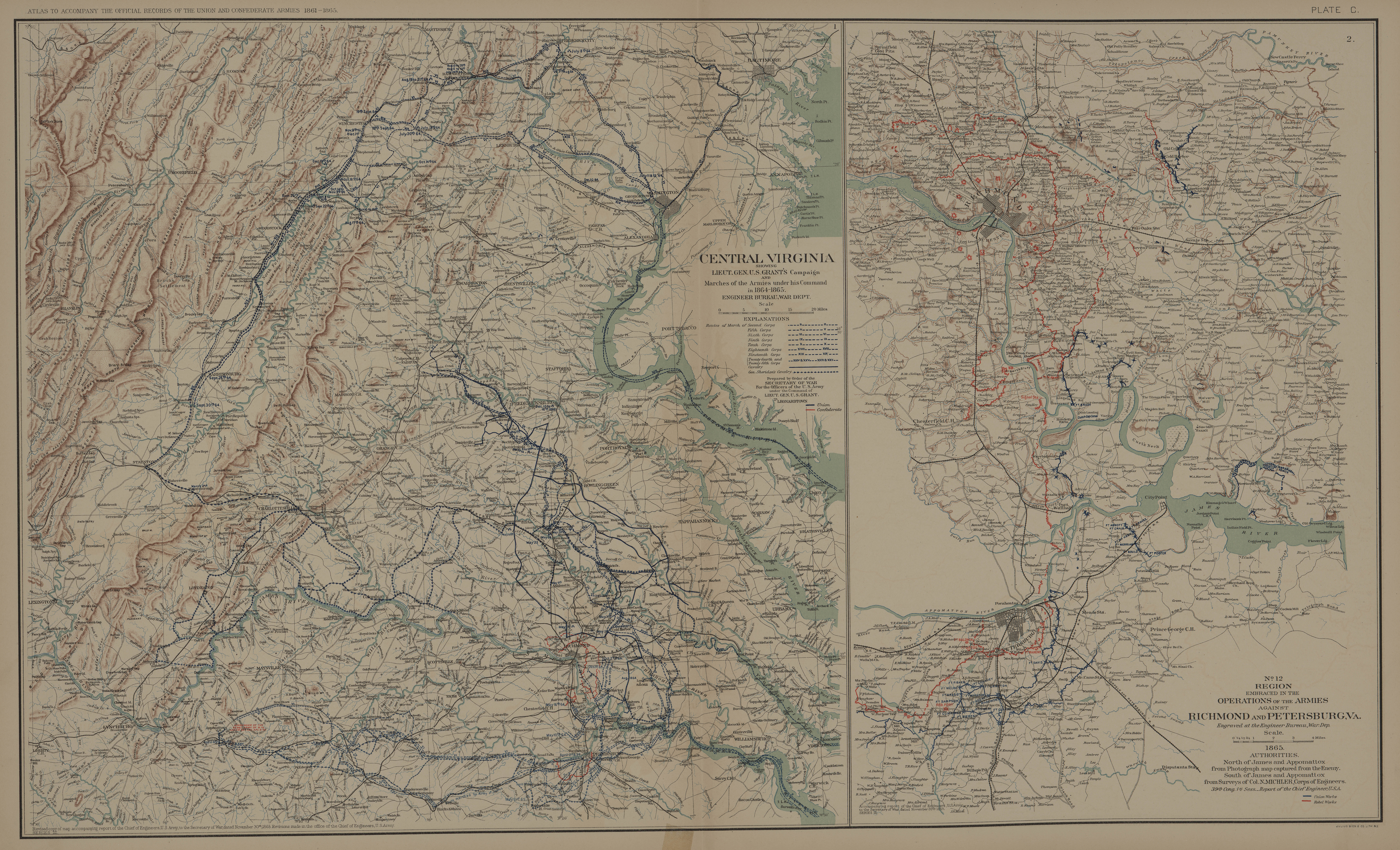
Union marches and operations in Central Virginia (1864–65)

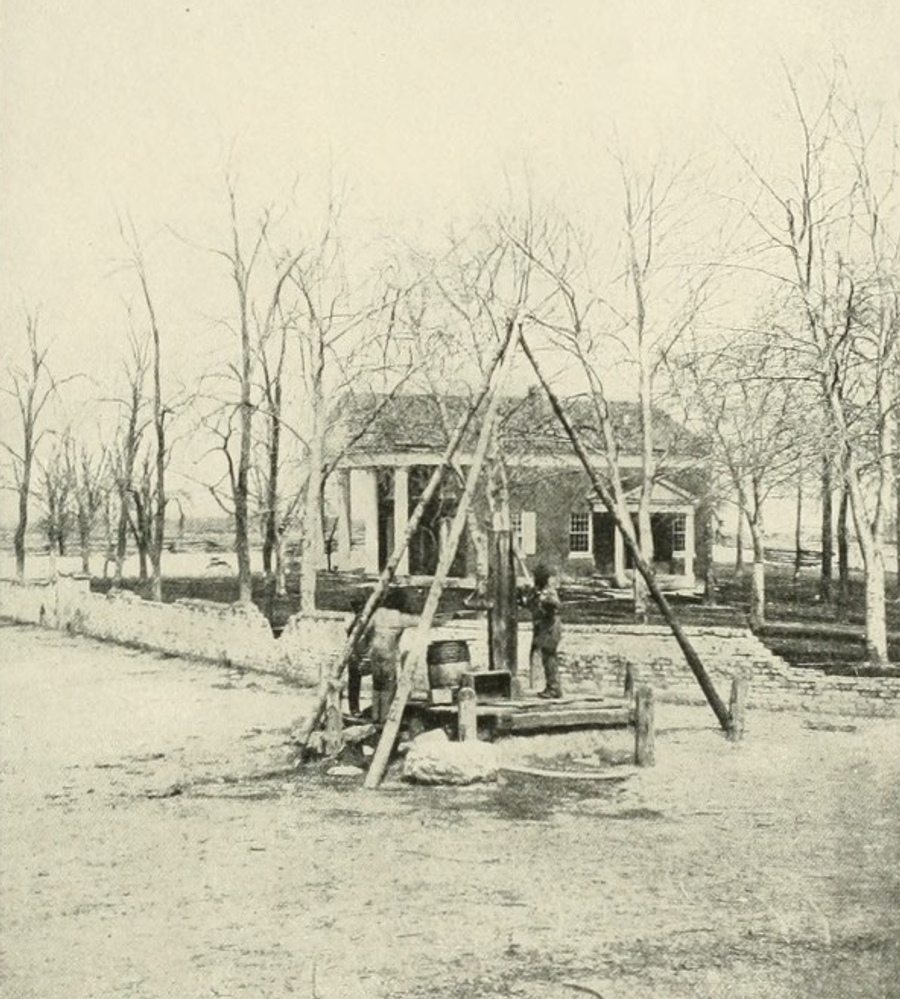
Spotsylvania Courthouse, 1864

In March 1864, Grant was summoned from the Western Theater, promoted to lieutenant general, and given command of all Union armies. He chose to make his headquarters with the Army of the Potomac, although Maj. Gen. George G. Meade remained the actual commander of that army. He left Maj. Gen. William Tecumseh Sherman in command of most of the western armies. Grant and President Abraham Lincoln devised a coordinated strategy that would strike at the heart of the Confederacy from multiple directions, including attacks against Lee near Richmond, Virginia, and in the Shenandoah Valley, West Virginia, Georgia, and Mobile, Alabama. This was the first time the Union armies would have a coordinated offensive strategy across a number of theaters.

Grant's campaign objective was not the Confederate capital of Richmond, but the destruction of Lee's army. Lincoln had long advocated this strategy for his generals, recognizing that the city would certainly fall after the loss of its principal defensive army. Grant ordered Meade, "Wherever Lee goes, there you will go also." Although he hoped for a quick, decisive battle, Grant was prepared to fight a war of attrition. Both Union and Confederate casualties could be high, but the Union had far greater resources to replace lost soldiers and equipment.

On May 5, after Grant's army crossed the Rapidan and entered the Wilderness of Spotsylvania, it was attacked by Confederate Gen. Robert E. Lee's Army of Northern Virginia. Although Lee was outnumbered, about 60,000 to 100,000, his men fought fiercely and the dense foliage provided a terrain advantage. After two days of fighting and almost 29,000 casualties, the results were inconclusive and neither army was able to prevail.

Lee had stopped Grant, but had not turned him back, and Grant had not destroyed Lee's army. Under similar circumstances, previous Union commanders had chosen to withdraw north, behind the Rappahannock, but Grant instead ordered Meade to move around Lee's right flank and seize the important crossroads at Spotsylvania Court House to the southeast, hoping that by interposing his army between Lee and Richmond, he could lure the Confederates into another battle on a more favorable field.

== Opposing forces ==
=== Union ===
Principal Union commanders
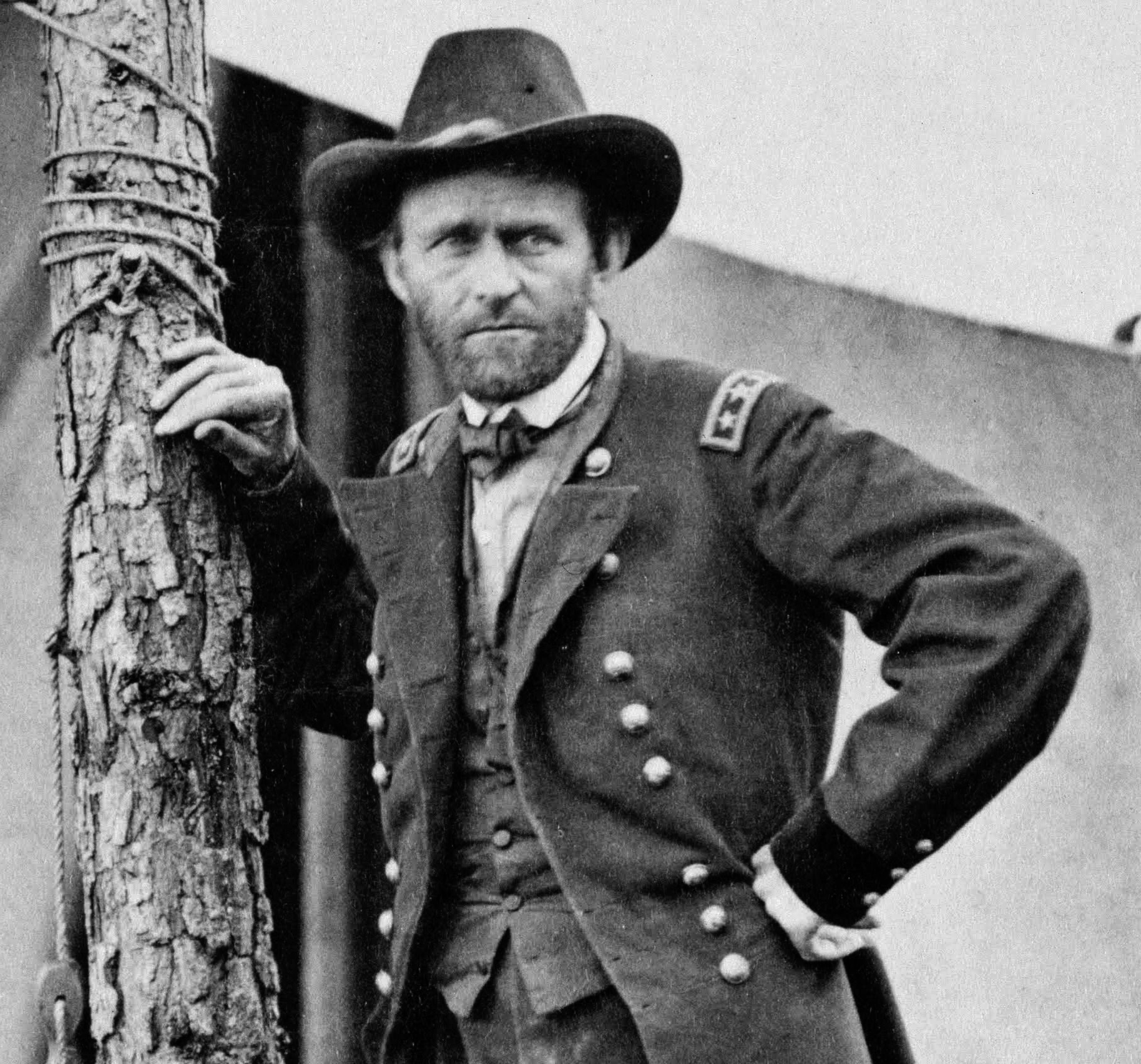
Lt. Gen. Ulysses S. Grant, Union Army

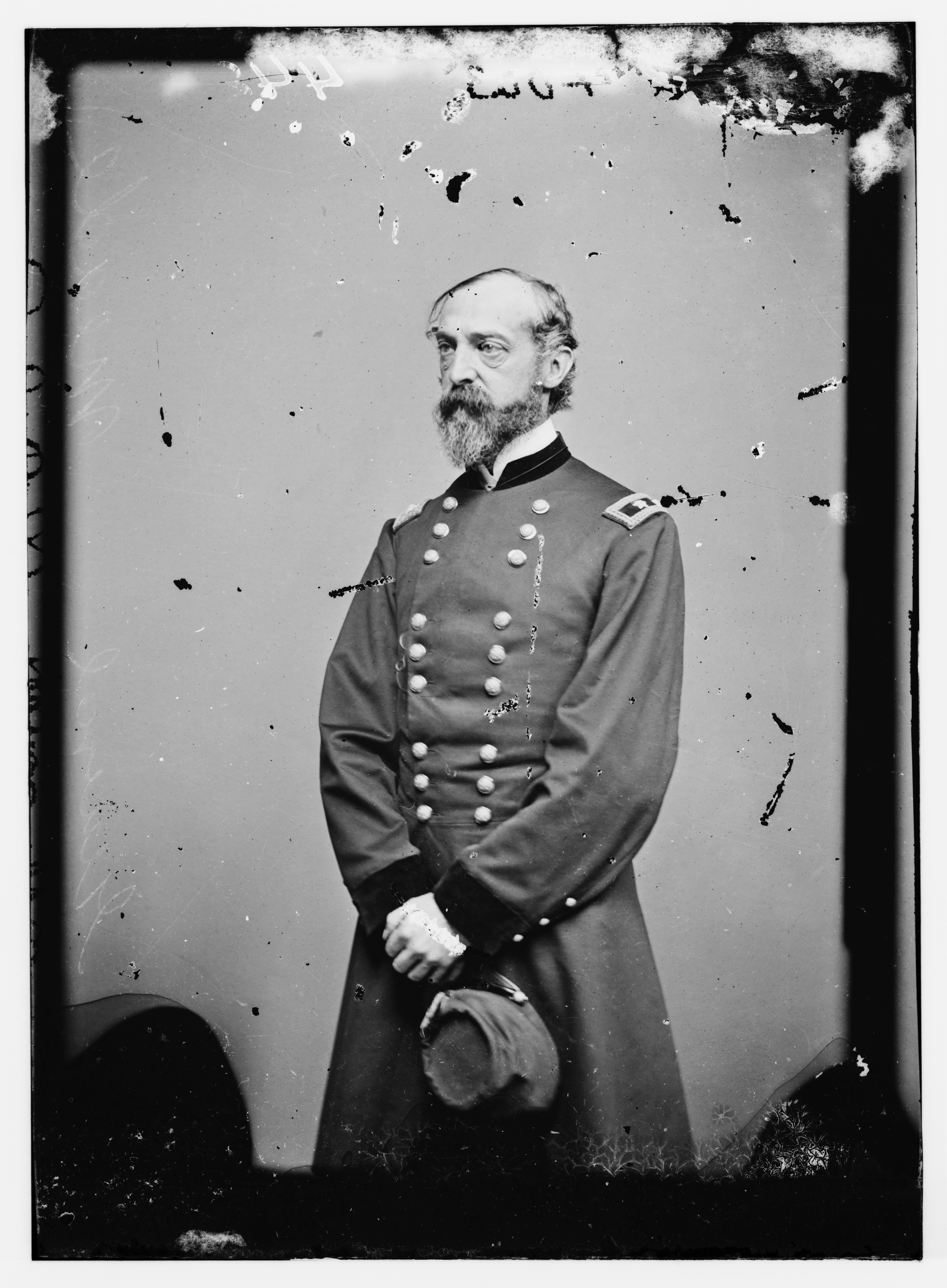
Maj. Gen. George G. Meade, Army of the Potomac

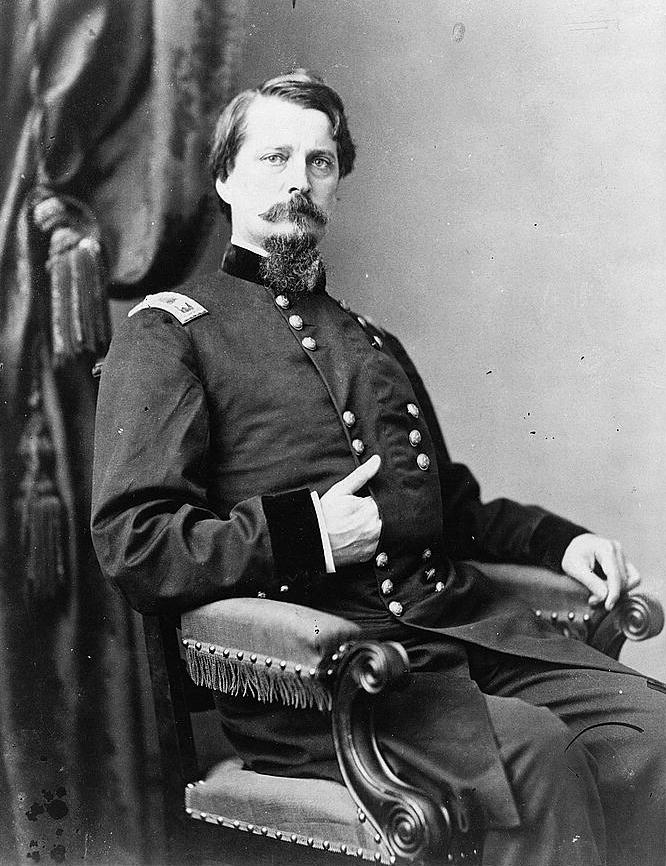
Maj. Gen. Winfield S. Hancock, II Corps

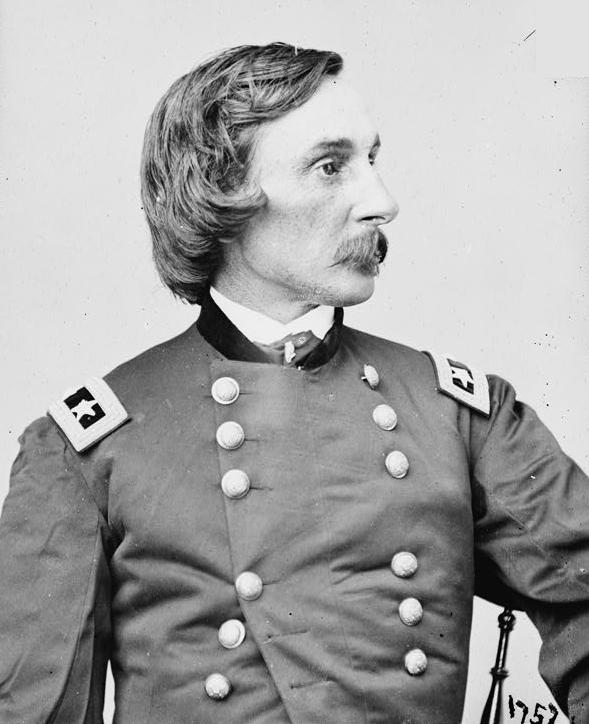
Maj. Gen. Gouverneur K. Warren, V Corps

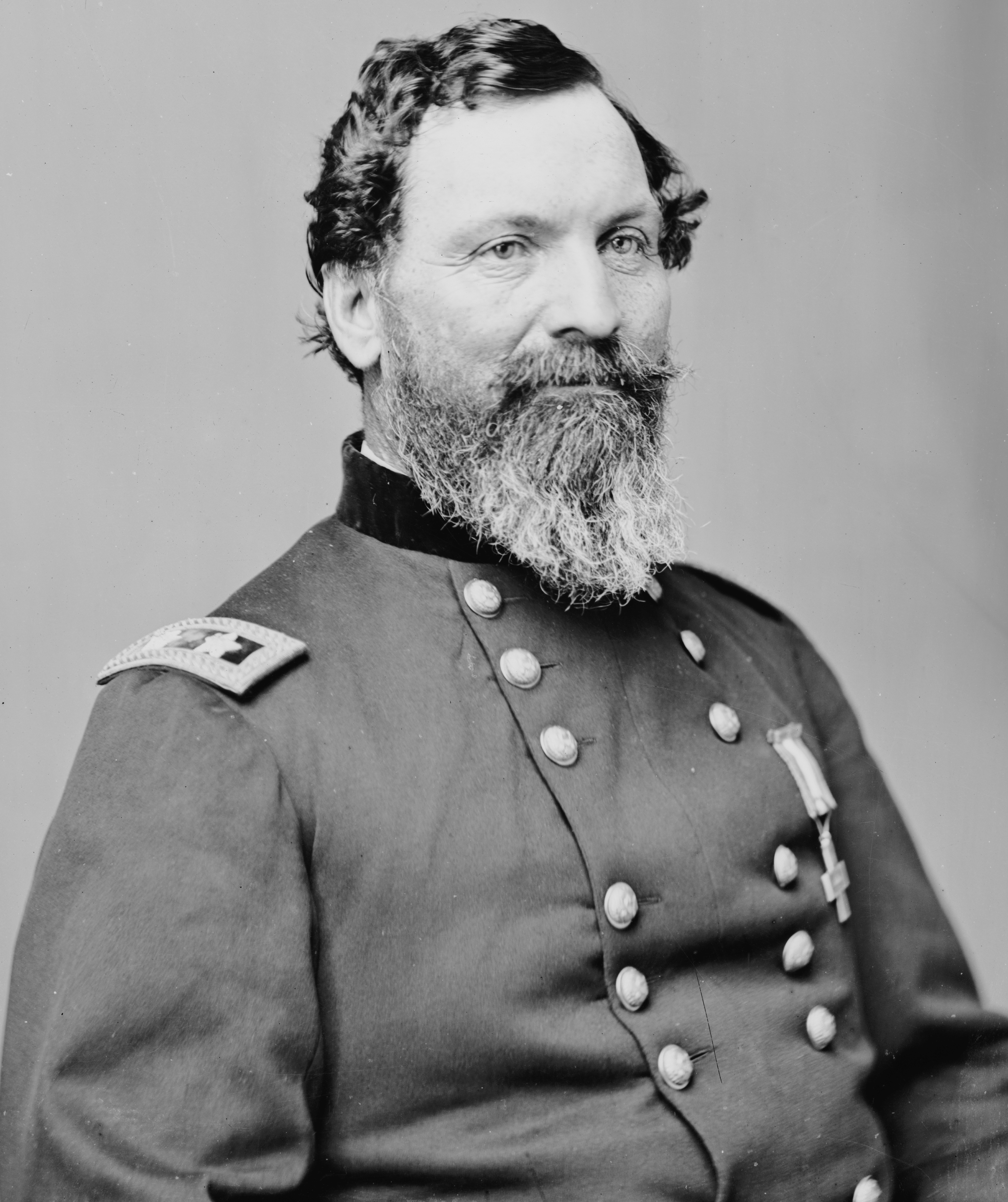
Maj. Gen. John Sedgwick, VI Corps

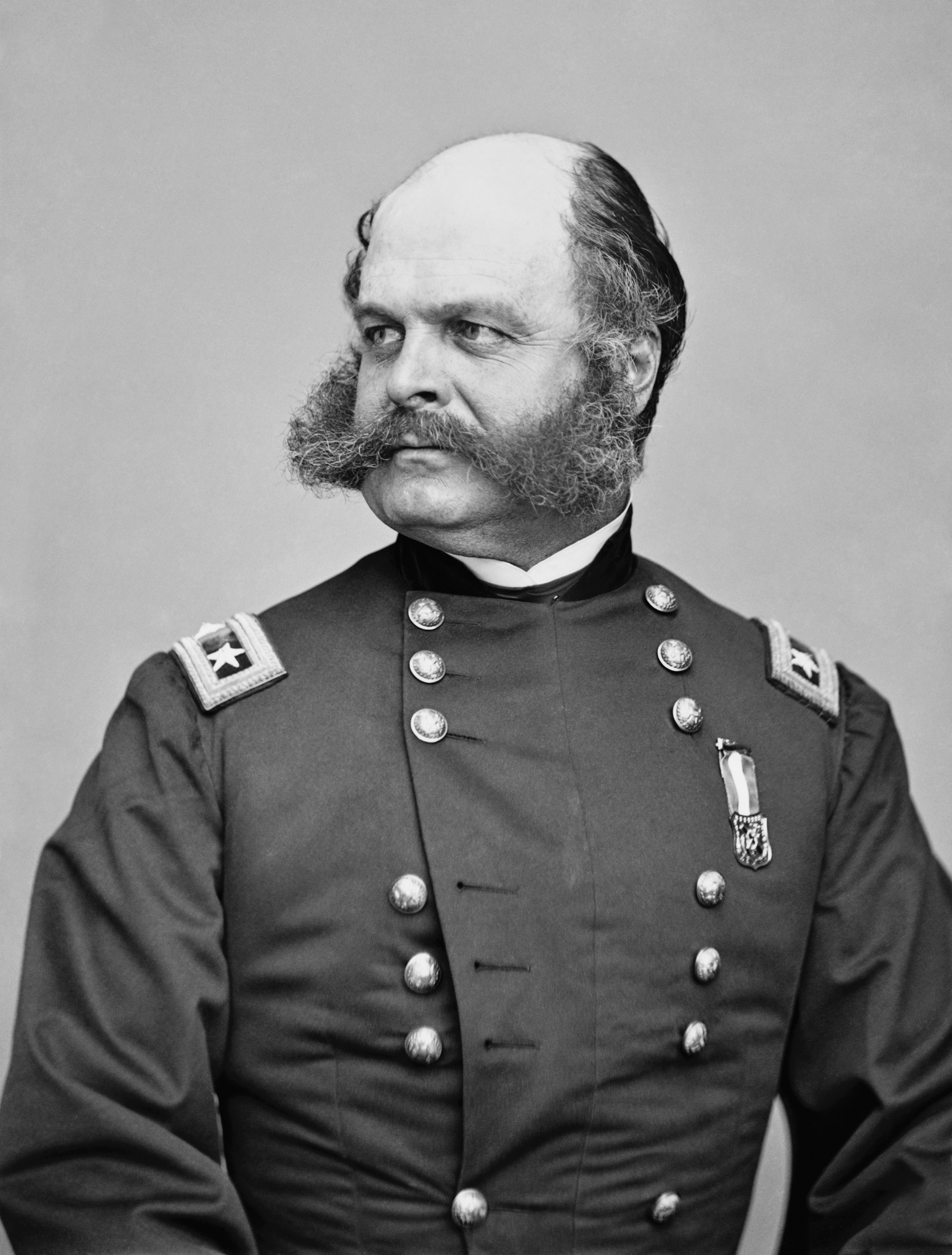
Maj. Gen. Ambrose E. Burnside, IX Corps

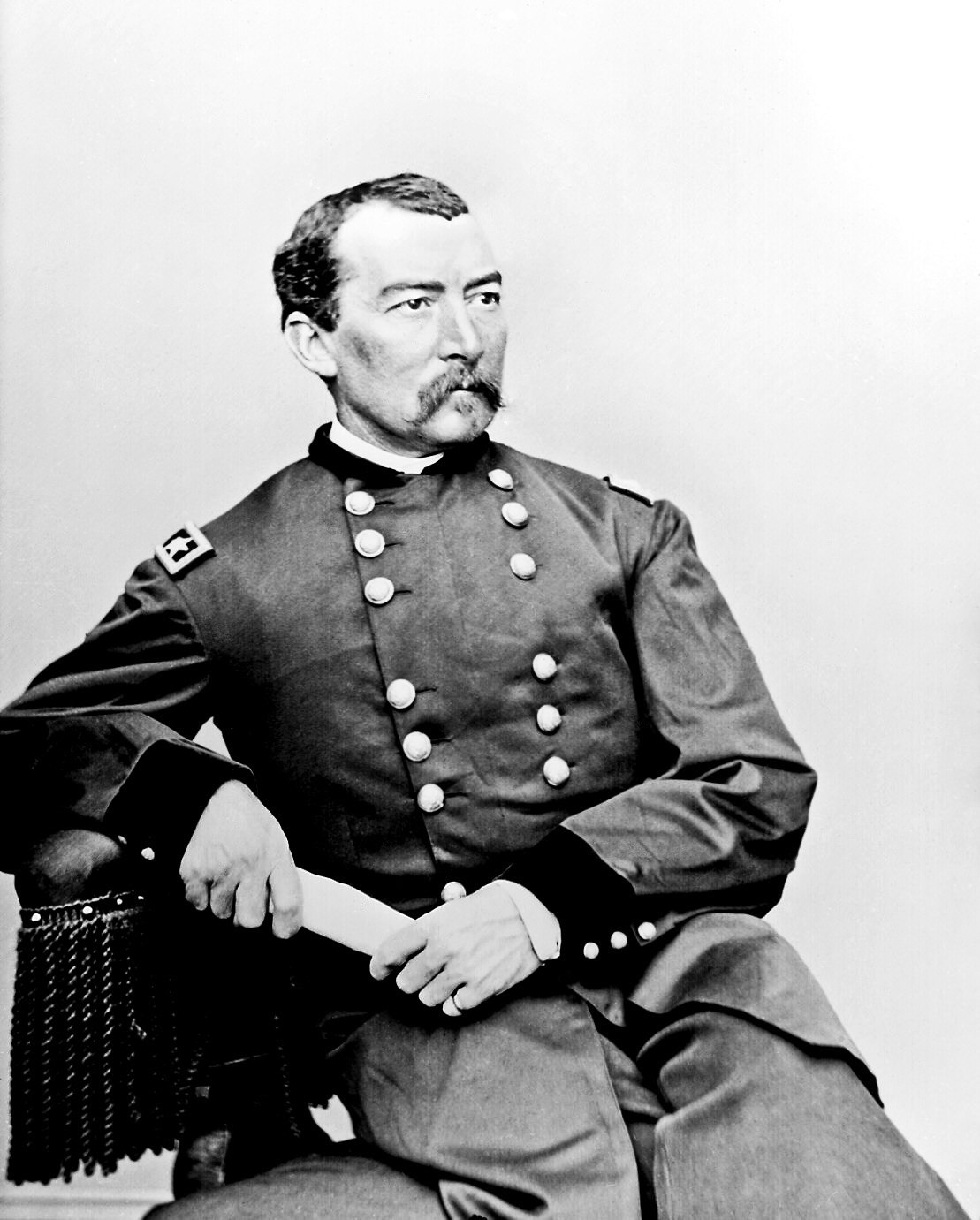
Maj. Gen. Philip Sheridan, Cavalry Corps

As of May 7, Grant's Union forces totaled approximately 100,000 men. They consisted of the Army of the Potomac, under Maj. Gen. George G. Meade, and the IX Corps (until May 24 formally part of the Army of the Ohio, reporting directly to Grant, not Meade). The five corps were:

- II Corps, under Maj. Gen. Winfield S. Hancock, including the divisions of Maj. Gen. David B. Birney and Brig. Gens. Francis C. Barlow, John Gibbon, and Gershom Mott. (Mott's 4th Division was discontinued on May 13 and its brigades were distributed to other divisions in the corps. On May 18, a new 4th Division was constituted with reinforcements of heavy artillery regiments from Washington, D.C., under the command of Brig. Gen. Robert O. Tyler, known informally as Tyler's Division of Heavy Artillery.)
- V Corps, under Maj. Gen. Gouverneur K. Warren, including the divisions of Brig. Gens. Charles Griffin, John C. Robinson, Samuel W. Crawford, and Lysander Cutler. (Following the wounding of Robinson on May 8, his 2nd Division was temporarily disbanded and the brigades distributed to other divisions in the corps.)
- VI Corps, under Maj. Gen. John Sedgwick, including the divisions of Brig. Gens. Horatio G. Wright, Thomas H. Neill, and James B. Ricketts. (Sedgwick was killed on May 9 and replaced by Wright. Wright's 1st Division was then commanded by Brig. Gen. David A. Russell.)
- IX Corps, under Maj. Gen. Ambrose Burnside, including the divisions of Brig. Gens. Thomas G. Stevenson, Robert B. Potter, Orlando B. Willcox, and Edward Ferrero. (Stevenson was killed on May 10 and was replaced in command of the 1st Division by Col. Daniel Leasure then Maj. Gen. Thomas L. Crittenden)
- Cavalry Corps, under Maj. Gen. Philip H. Sheridan, including the divisions of Brig. Gens. Alfred T.A. Torbert, David McM. Gregg, and James H. Wilson. (During the period of May 9–24, Sheridan's Cavalry Corps was absent on detached duty and took no further part in the operations around Spotsylvania Court House.)

=== Confederate ===
Confederate corps commanders
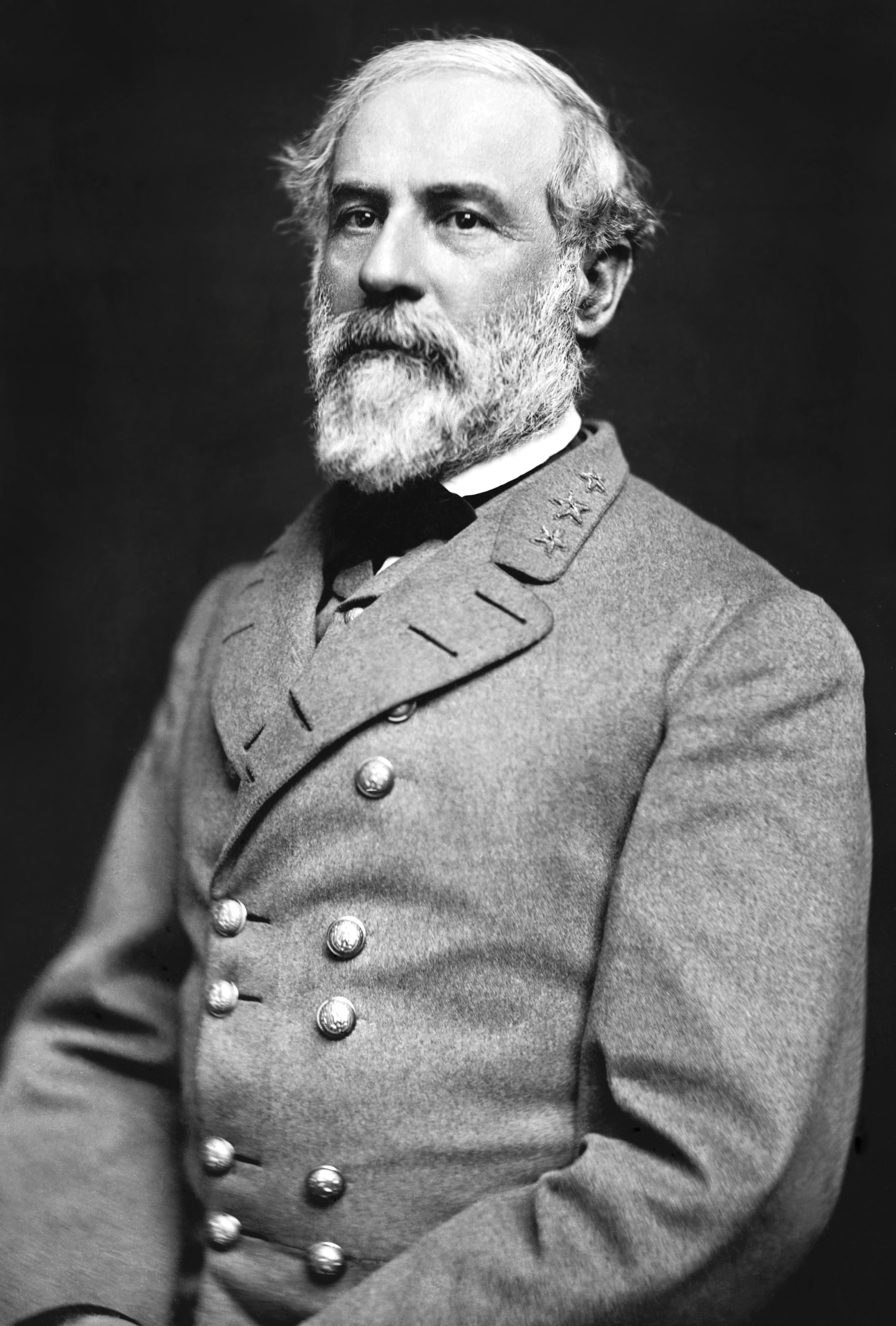
Gen. Robert E. Lee, Army of Northern Virginia

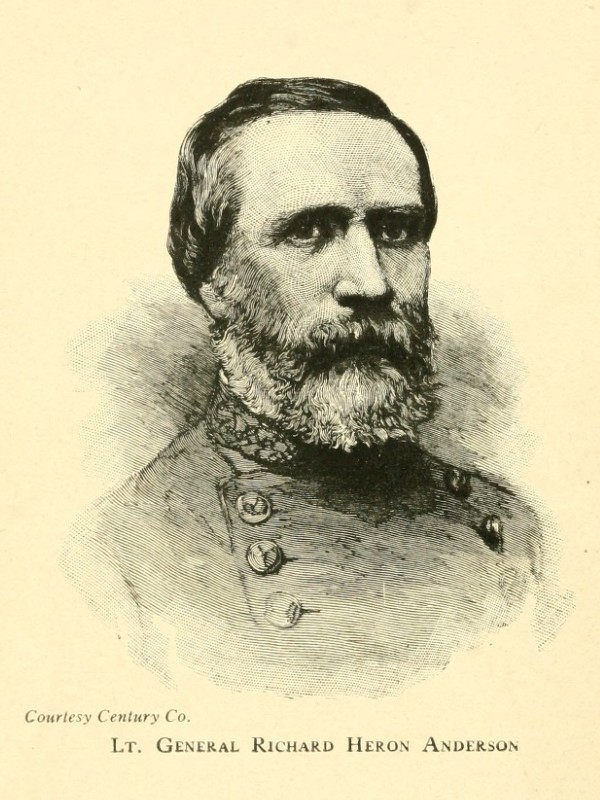
Maj. Gen. Richard H. Anderson, First Corps

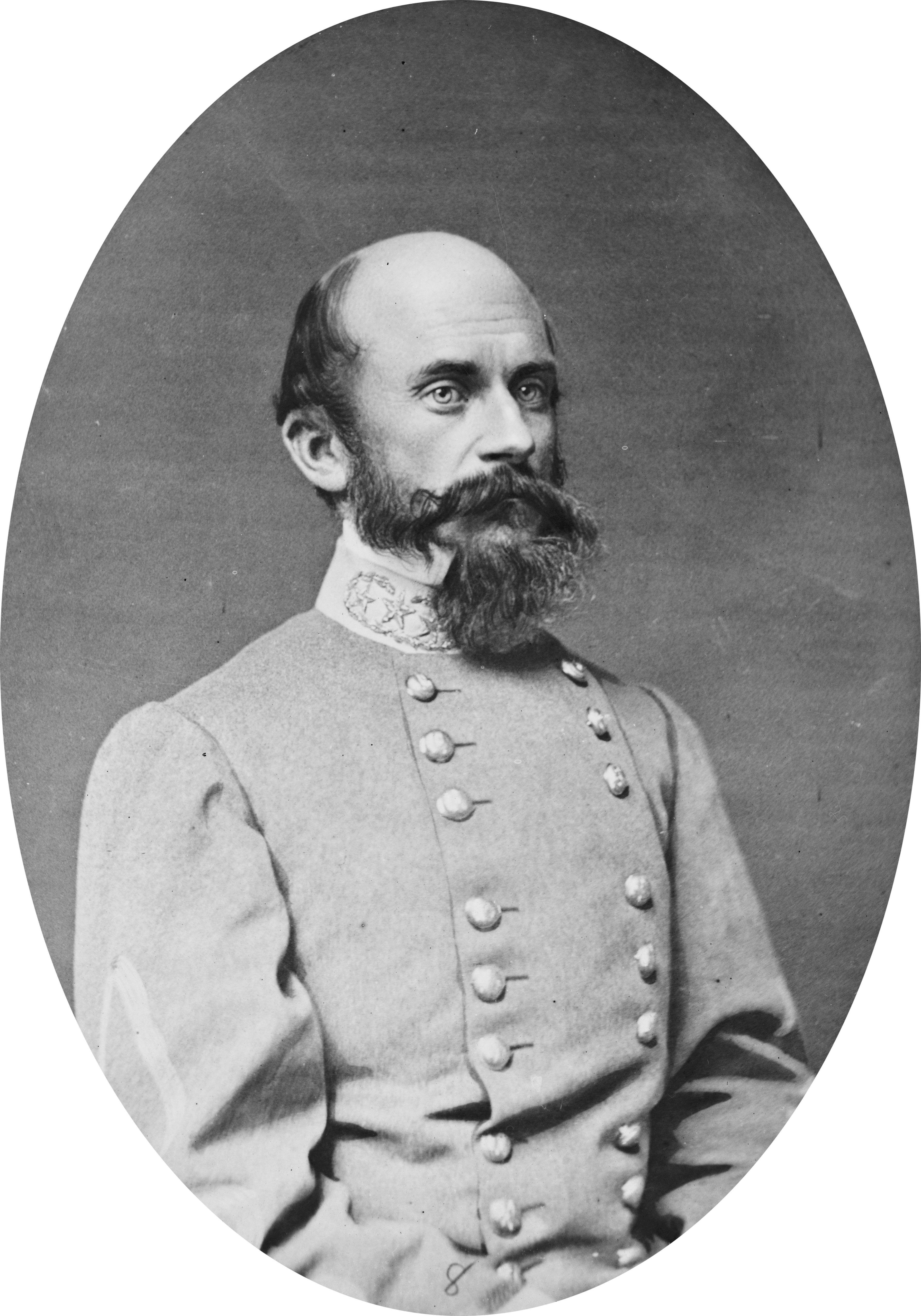
Lt. Gen. Richard S. Ewell, Second Corps

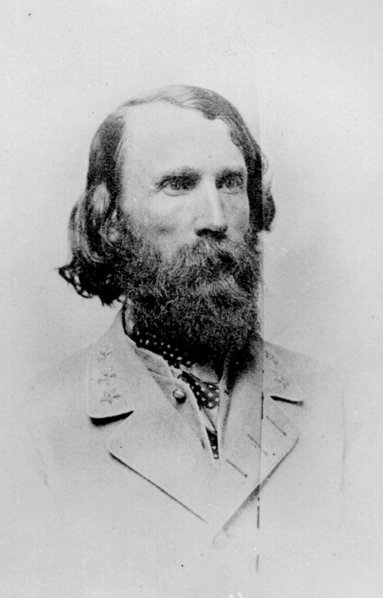
Lt. Gen. A.P. Hill, Third Corps

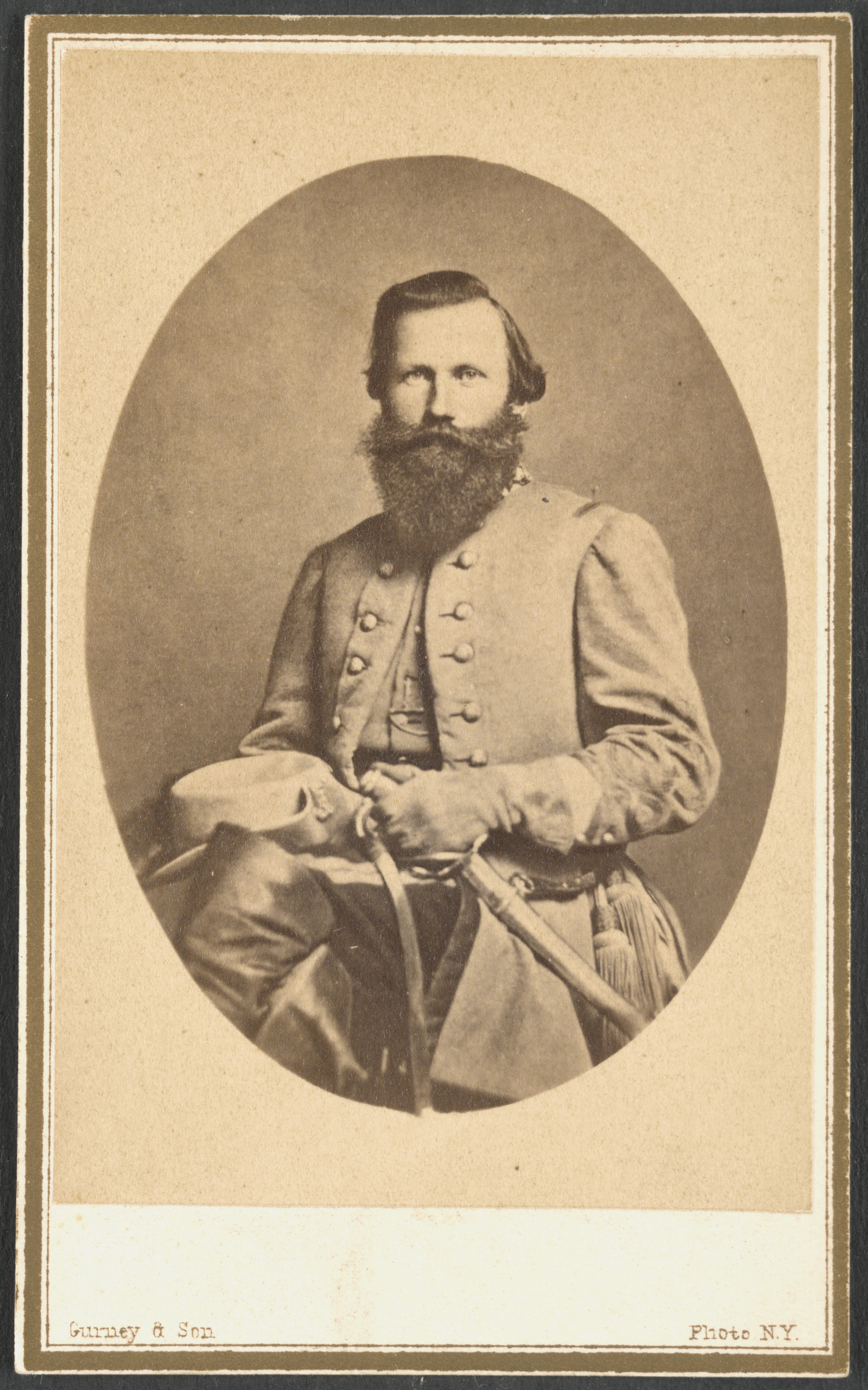
Maj. Gen. J.E.B. Stuart, Cavalry Corps

Lee's Confederate Army of Northern Virginia comprised about 52,000 men and was organized into four corps:

- First Corps, under Maj. Gen. Richard H. Anderson, including the divisions of Maj. Gen. Charles W. Field and Brig. Gen. Joseph B. Kershaw.
- Second Corps, under Lt. Gen. Richard S. Ewell, including the divisions of Maj. Gens. Jubal A. Early, Edward "Allegheny" Johnson, and Robert E. Rodes. (On May 8, Jubal Early assumed temporary command of the Third Corps; his replacement in command of Early's Division was Brig. Gen. John B. Gordon.)
- Third Corps, under Lt. Gen. A.P. Hill, including the divisions of Maj. Gens. Henry Heth and Cadmus M. Wilcox and Brig. Gen. William Mahone. (On May 8, Hill became ill and was replaced temporarily in corps command by Jubal Early.)
- Cavalry Corps, under Maj. Gen. J.E.B. Stuart, including the divisions of Maj. Gens. Wade Hampton, Fitzhugh Lee, and W.H.F. "Rooney" Lee.

== Initial movements ==
=== May 7: The race to Spotsylvania ===
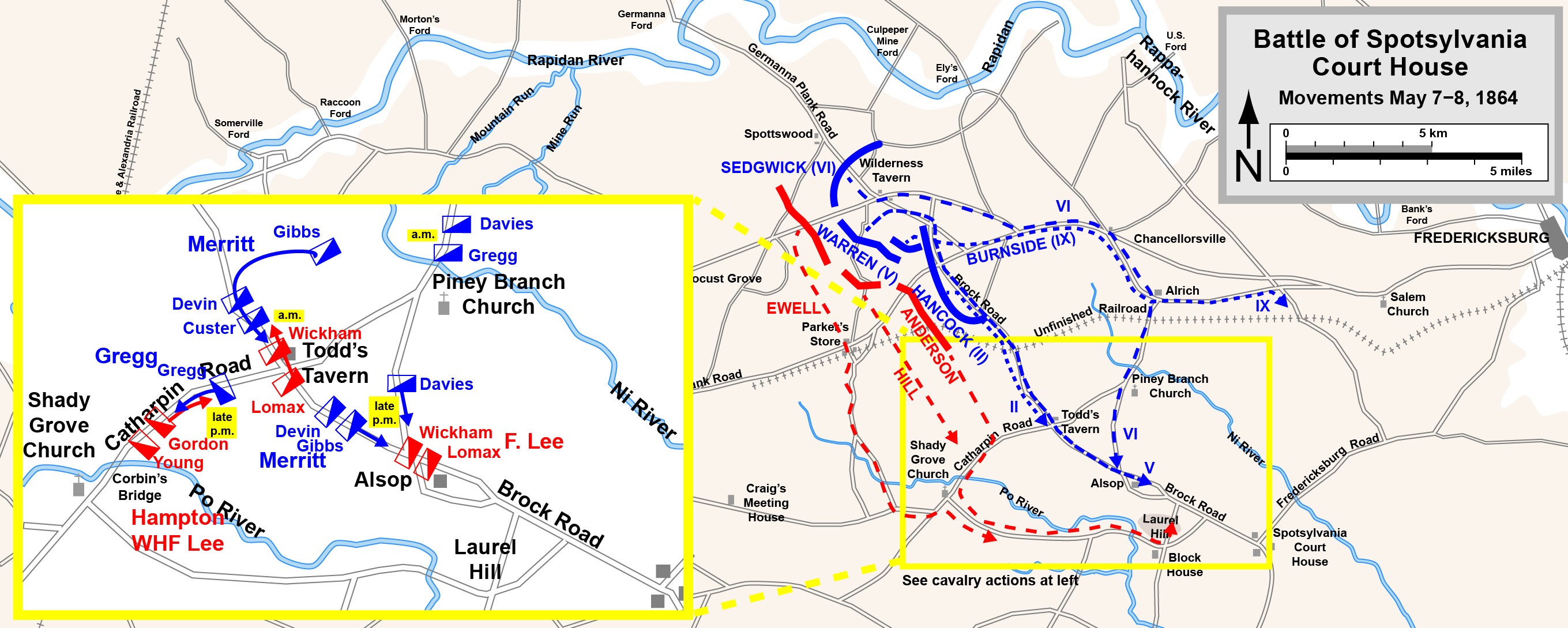
Movements on May 7, 1864; cavalry actions inset Confederate Union

Grant's orders to Meade were to march the night of May 7–8 over two routes, reaching Spotsylvania Court House, 10 miles (16 km) to the southeast, with at least one corps the morning of May 8. Warren's V Corps would take the Brock Road, followed by Hancock's II Corps. Sedgwick's VI Corps would head toward Chancellorsville on the Orange Plank Road, and then turn south, followed by Burnside's IX Corps.

Meade began by ordering Sheridan's Cavalry Corps to clear the Brock Road for the infantry, but the troopers soon bogged down. The brigade of Col. J. Irvin Gregg (David Gregg's division), was stopped at Corbin's Bridge on the Catharpin Road by cavalrymen under Wade Hampton and Rooney Lee. Gregg's men withdrew to a field west of Todd's Tavern, constructed rudimentary earthworks, and repulsed a series of Confederate attacks.

Wesley Merritt's Union division encountered Fitzhugh Lee's cavalry behind barricades on the Brock Road about a mile south of Todd's Tavern. Sharp fighting resulted in the late afternoon, and by nightfall, Sheridan decided against continuing in the dark and ordered his men to bivouac at Todd's Tavern. The first Union infantry began moving at 8 p.m. and their advance was plagued by traffic jams. When Meade reached Todd's Tavern after midnight he was infuriated to see Sheridan's sleeping cavalrymen and ordered them to resume their road clearing operation.

Lee was unsure of Grant's plan. Reconnaissance told him that the river crossing equipment had been removed from Germanna Ford, so Grant would not be withdrawing as his predecessors had. The Union Army could either be heading east to Fredericksburg or moving south. In either event, the crossroads at Spotsylvania Court House would play an important role, so Lee ordered his artillery chief, Brig. Gen. William N. Pendleton, to begin constructing a road through the woods from the Confederate position at the Wilderness due south to the Catharpin Road. He also ordered Maj. Gen. Richard H. Anderson, who had replaced Lt. Gen. James Longstreet in command of the First Corps following that officer's wounding on May 6, to move out along that road. Lee did not indicate any need for haste, but Anderson and his men desired to leave the stench of burning forest and dead bodies in the Wilderness, so they began marching about 10 p.m.

== Battle ==
=== May 8: Laurel Hill and cavalry troubles ===
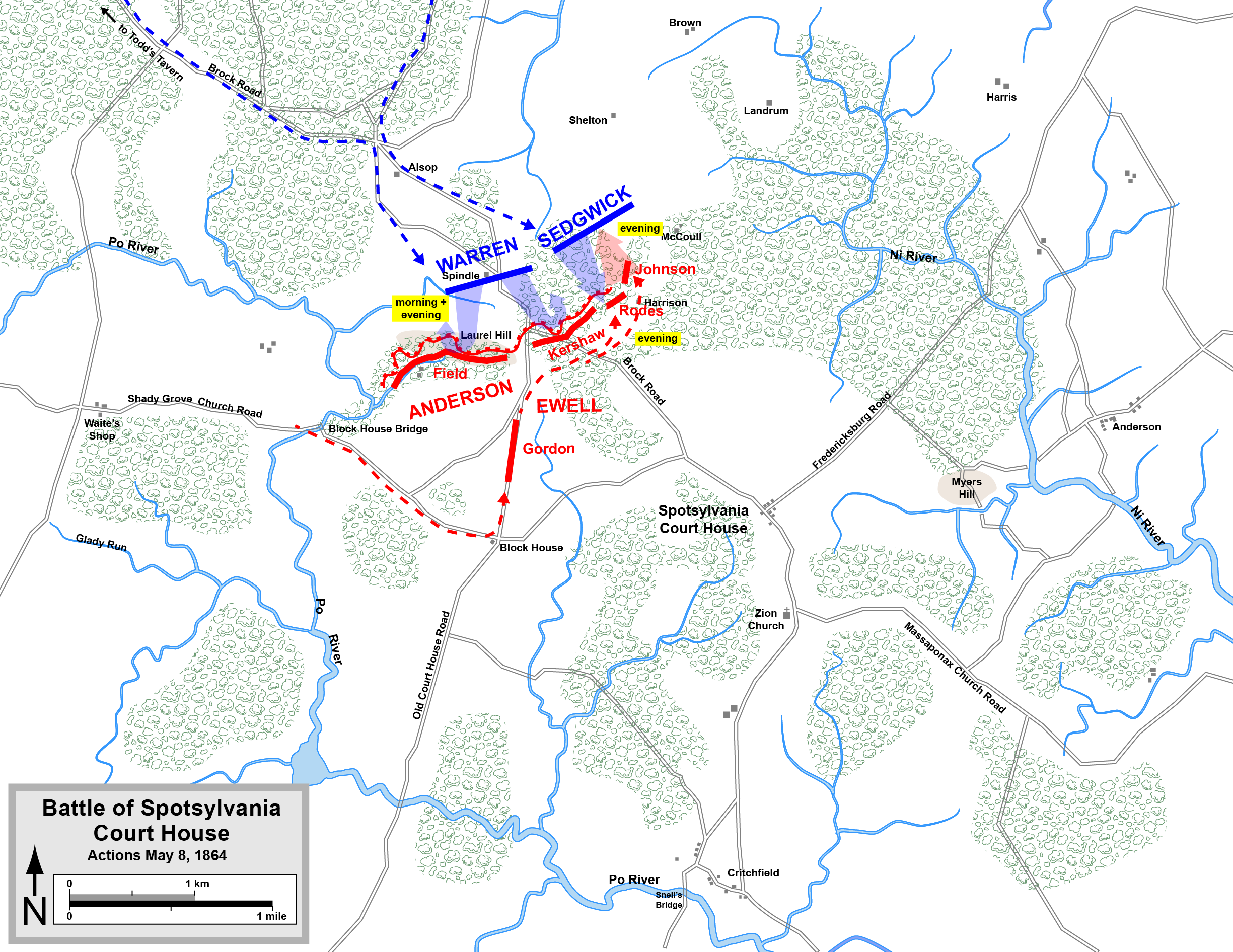
Attacks on the Laurel Hill line, May 8

At dawn on May 8, Wesley Merritt's cavalrymen attacked Fitzhugh Lee's barricades on the Brock Road again, but were repulsed. Meade ordered Warren's V Corps to break through with infantry and the division of Brig. Gen. John C. Robinson led the way in overwhelming the cavalry obstacle. Fitzhugh Lee's horse artillery made a gallant stand around the Alsop farm and delayed the Union advance while the cavalrymen staked out a defensive line on a low ridge just south of the Spindle farm clearing, which they dubbed "Laurel Hill." Lee sent for help to Anderson's infantry, which by now had reached the Block House Bridge on the Po River and were eating breakfast. Anderson immediately dispatched two infantry brigades and an artillery battalion, which arrived at Laurel Hill just as Warren's men pulled up within 100 yards to the north.

Assuming that only cavalry blocked his path, Warren ordered an immediate attack against Laurel Hill. Multiple attacks by the divisions of the V Corps were repulsed with heavy casualties, and by noon the Union troops began building earthworks on the northern end of the Spindle clearing. Meanwhile, the Union cavalry division under James H. Wilson had reached and occupied the town of Spotsylvania Court House at 8 a.m. Wilson sent a brigade under Col. John B. McIntosh up the Brock Road with the intention of striking the Confederate position at Laurel Hill from the rear. J.E.B. Stuart had only a single cavalry regiment available to send out against McIntosh, but Anderson's infantry division under Joseph B. Kershaw was marching in that direction. With orders from Sheridan to withdraw and with Confederate infantry in hot pursuit, Wilson withdrew up the Fredericksburg Road.

Generals Meade and Sheridan had quarreled about the cavalry's performance throughout the campaign and this incident with Wilson, compounding the frustration of the uncleared Brock Road, brought Meade's notorious temper to a boil. After a heated exchange laced with expletives on both sides, Sheridan told Meade that he could "whip Stuart" if Meade let him. Meade reported the conversation to Grant, who replied, "Well, he generally knows what he is talking about. Let him start right out and do it." Meade deferred to Grant's judgment and issued orders to Sheridan to "proceed against the enemy's cavalry." Sheridan's entire command of 10,000 cavalrymen departed the following day. They engaged with (and mortally wounded) Stuart at the Battle of Yellow Tavern on May 11, threatened the outskirts of Richmond, refitted near the James River, and did not return to the army until May 24. Grant and Meade were left without cavalry resources during the critical days of the battle to come.

While Warren was unsuccessfully attacking Laurel Hill the morning of May 8, Hancock's II Corps had reached Todd's Tavern and erected defenses to the west on the Catharpin Road, protecting the rear of the army. Jubal Early, who had just replaced A.P. Hill as Third Corps commander because of his illness, decided to test the defenses and sent the division of William Mahone and some cavalry. After a short fight, Hancock's division under Francis C. Barlow withdrew back to Todd's Tavern and Early decided not to pursue.

In the afternoon, Sedgwick's VI Corps arrived near Laurel Hill and extended Warren's line to the east. By 7 p.m., both corps began a coordinated assault, but were repulsed by heavy fire. They attempted to move around Anderson's right flank, but were surprised to find that divisions from Ewell's Second Corps had arrived in that sector to repulse them again. Meade had not had a good day. He lost the race to Spotsylvania, he was dissatisfied with his cavalry, he judged Sedgwick to be "constitutionally slow", and he was most disappointed that Warren had been unsuccessful at Laurel Hill, telling him that he had "lost his nerve."

=== May 9: Fortifications, Sedgwick, and Hancock ===
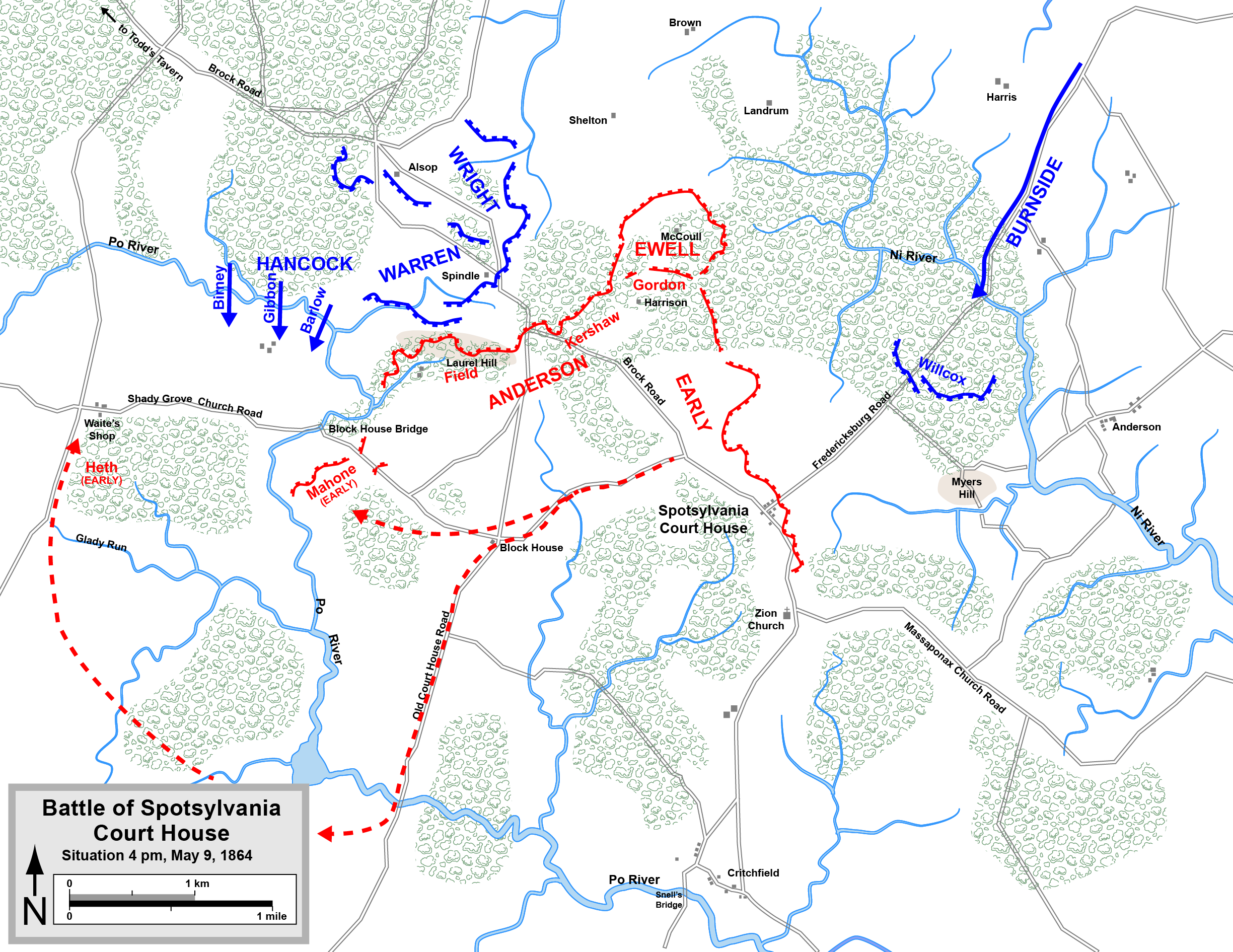
Positions and movements on the Union flanks, May 9

With such entrenchments as these, having artillery throughout, with flank fire along the lines wherever practicable, and with the rifled musket then in use, which were effective at three hundred yards as the smooth-bore muskets at sixty yards, the strength of an army sustaining attack was more than quadrupled, provided they had force to man the entrenchments well.

— Maj. Gen. Andrew A. Humphreys, chief of staff to General Meade

Over the night of May 8–9, the Confederates were busy erecting a series of earthworks, more than four miles (6.4 km) long, starting at the Po River, encompassing the Laurel Hill line, crossing the Brock Road, jutting out in a horseshoe shape and then extending south past the courthouse intersection. The earthworks were reinforced with timber and guarded by artillery placed to allow enfilade fire on any attacking force. There was only one potential weakness in Lee's line—the exposed salient known as the "Mule Shoe" extending more than a mile (1.6 km) in front of the main trench line. Although Lee's engineers were aware of this problem, they extended the line to incorporate some minor high ground to Anderson's right, knowing that they would be at a disadvantage if the Union occupied it.

The Union soldiers were also busy building their own entrenchments. At about 9 a.m., Maj. Gen. John Sedgwick was inspecting his VI Corps line when he was shot through the head by a Confederate sharpshooter's bullet, dying instantly, having just made the celebrated remark "they couldn't hit an elephant at this distance". Sedgwick was one of the most beloved generals in the Union Army and his death was a hard blow to his men and colleagues. Meade ordered Maj. Gen. Horatio G. Wright, the senior division commander, to replace Sedgwick.

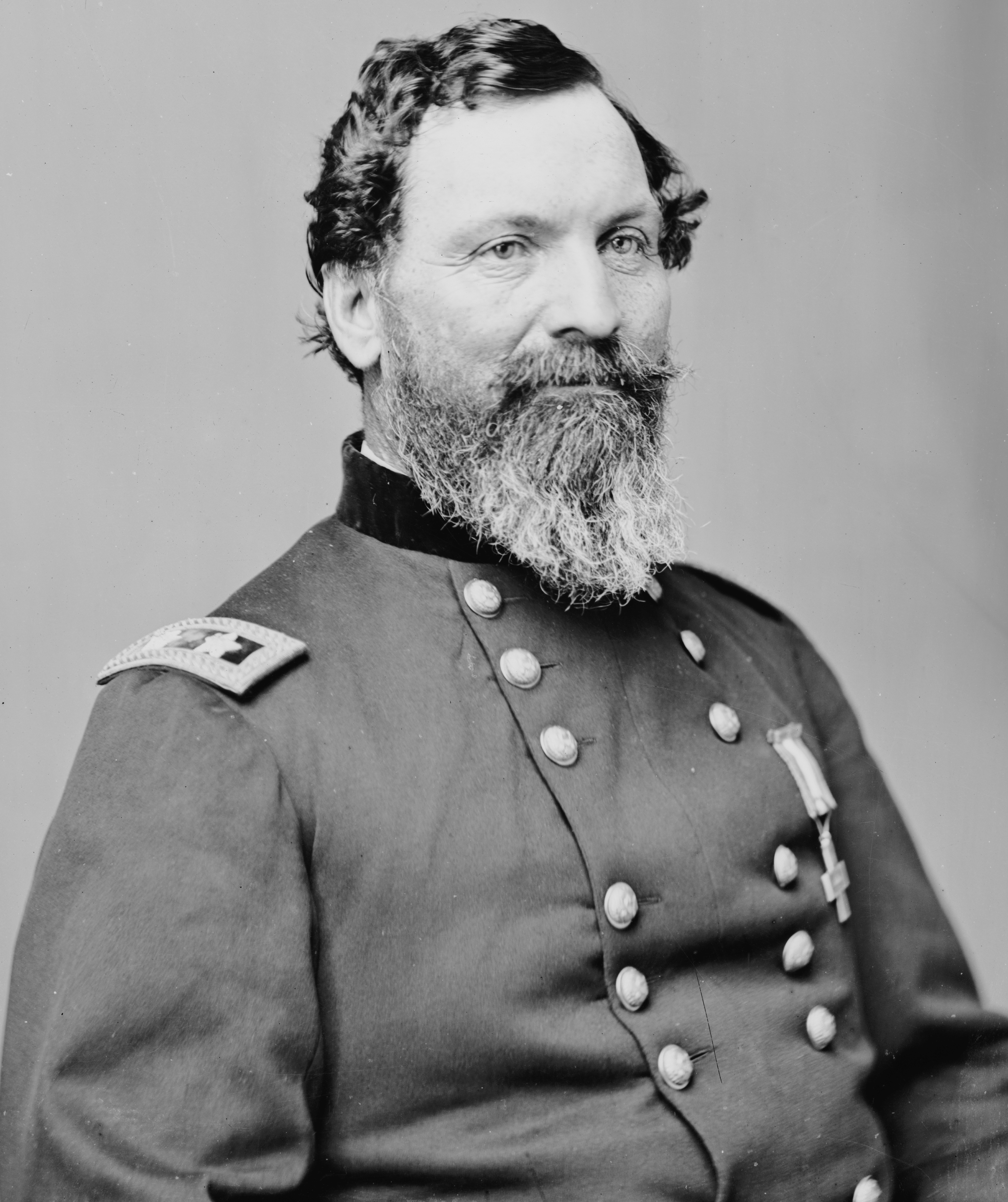
John Sedgwick

On the Union left, Burnside's IX Corps approached on the Fredericksburg Road from Alrich, led by Brig. Gen. Orlando B. Willcox's division, but they were delayed by Fitzhugh Lee's cavalrymen. When they reached close enough to observe that the Confederates were at Spotsylvania Court House, Burnside became concerned that he was too far in advance of Meade's force and ordered his men to begin entrenching. At this same time, Hancock was reporting from the right flank that Early's men had pulled back from his front. Grant absorbed these two observations and concluded that the Confederates were shifting their men from west to east, opening an opportunity for an attack. He ordered Hancock to cross the Po and attack the Confederates' left flank, driving them back toward Burnside's position near the Ni River, while the rest of his command, in the center, watched for an opening to attack there as well.

Hancock's II Corps advanced across the Po, but he became nervous that the Confederates had the Block House Bridge heavily defended and decided to delay his attack until the morning. This error was fatal to Grant's plan. That night, Lee moved two divisions of Jubal Early's corps from Spotsylvania Court House into position against Hancock. Mahone's division was placed directly in Hancock's path of advance while Henry Heth's division swung around to approach Hancock's right flank.

=== May 10: Grant attacks ===
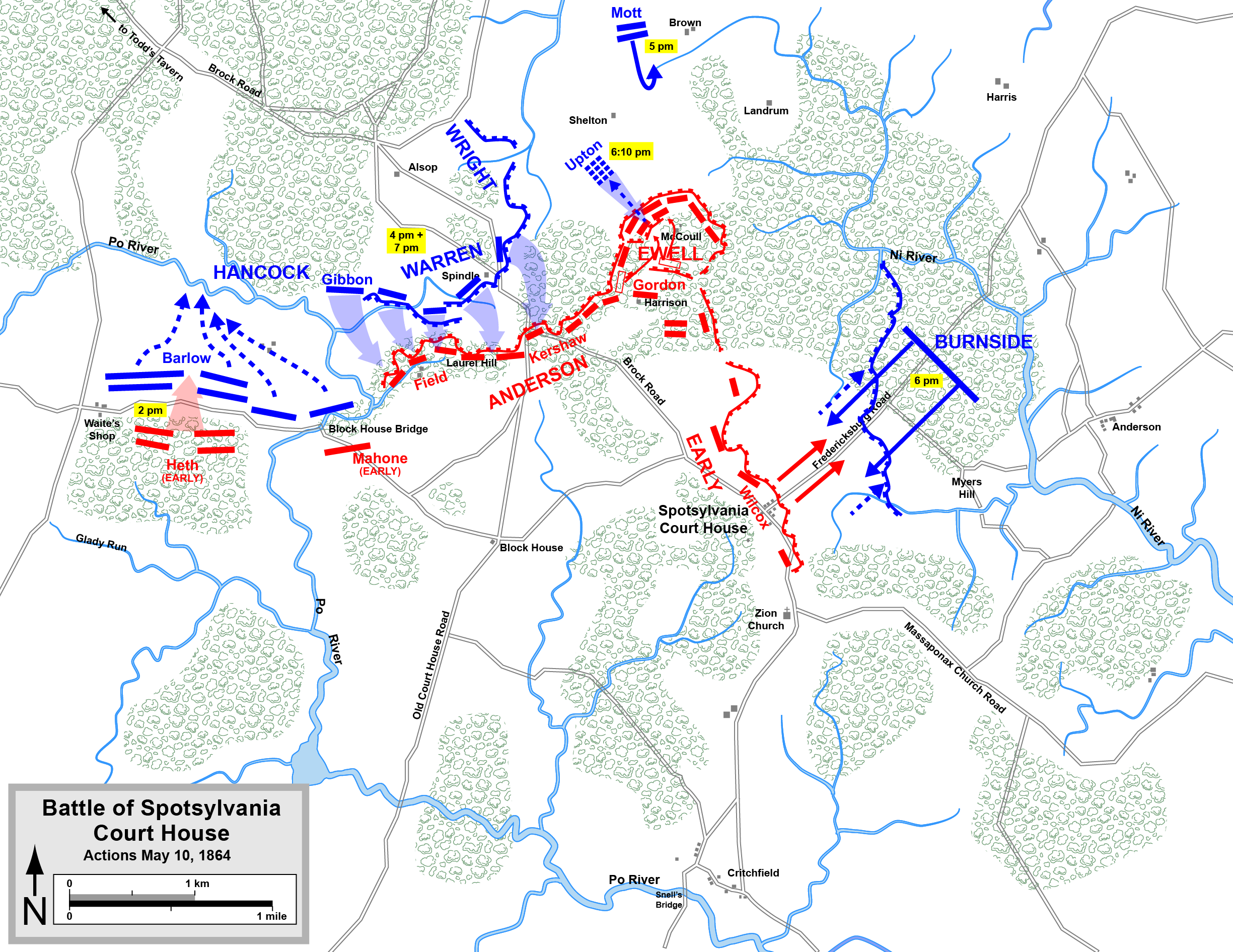
Grant attacks, May 10

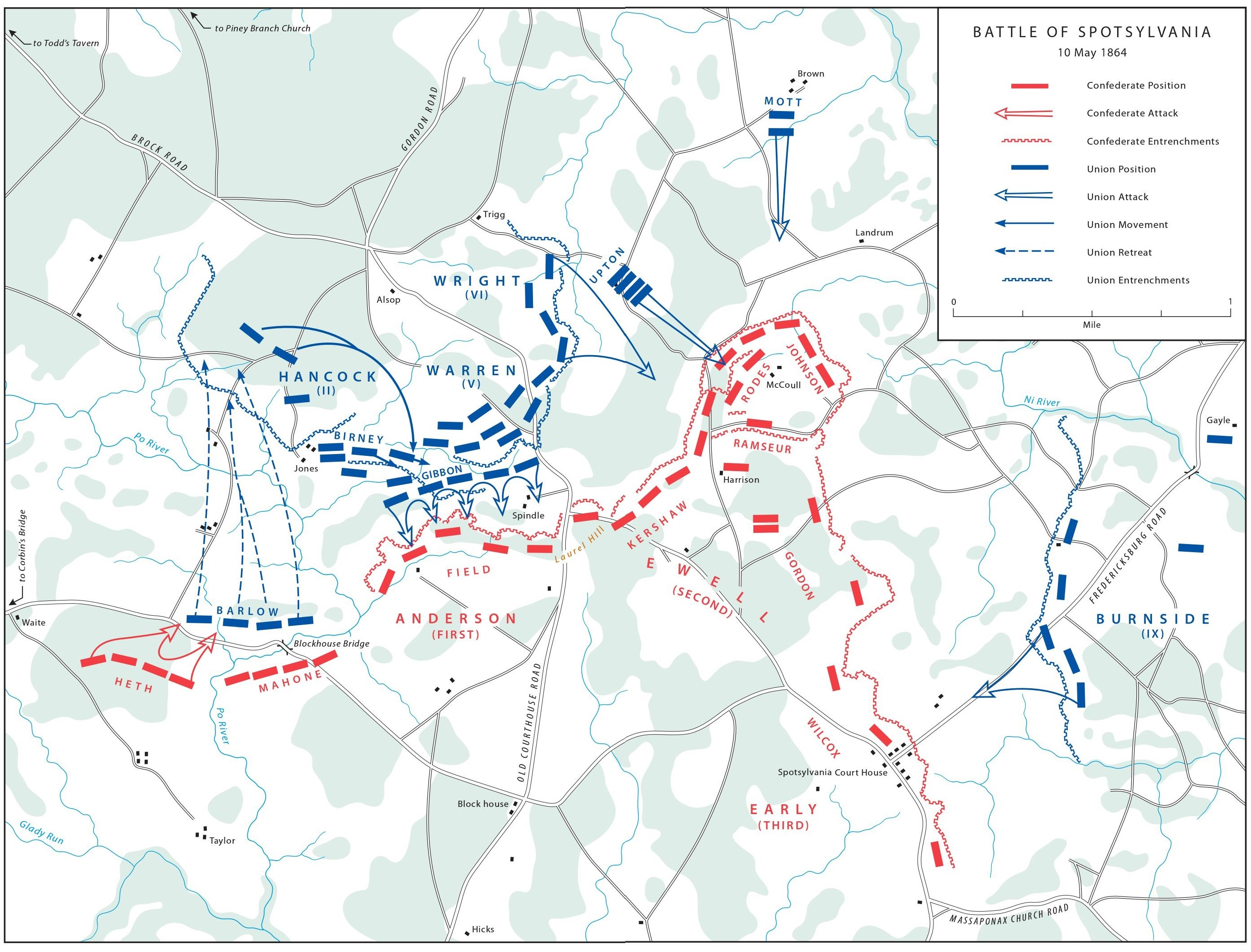
Grant attacks, May 10 (additional map)

As morning dawned, Grant realized his assumptions about Lee's dispositions were wrong and that Hancock was facing a significant threat on his front. However, this opened a new opportunity. He guessed (incorrectly) that the troops facing Hancock had been withdrawn from Laurel Hill. He ordered Hancock to withdraw north of the Po, leaving a single division in place to occupy the Confederates in that sector, while the rest of his army was to attack at 5 p.m. across the entire Confederate line, which would identify and exploit any potential weak spot. Hancock left Francis C. Barlow's division behind hasty earthworks along Shady Grove Church Road and withdrew the remainder of his men north of the Po.

At 2 p.m., Jubal Early decided to attack Barlow with Henry Heth's division. Barlow's men were soon in a difficult position as Confederate artillery lobbed in shells that set the surrounding woods on fire. They were able to retreat through a mile-long corridor and crossed the Po without being captured, destroying the bridges behind them. Grant's tactics were criticized for this so-called "Battle of the Po." Since he had ordered Hancock to move late in the day on May 9, he allowed Robert E. Lee time to react and nullify the movement on May 10.

Hancock was needed in the Po sector to help Barlow's withdrawal, which meant that Warren was left in charge of the Laurel Hill sector. Immediately upon Hancock's departure, Warren requested permission from Meade to attack Laurel Hill immediately, uncoordinated with the rest of Grant's attack, scheduled for 5 p.m. Warren was embarrassed by his performance the previous day and wanted to restore his reputation for aggressiveness. For reasons unexplained, Meade acceded to the request. At 4:00 PM, elements of the II and V Corps assaulted the Confederate trenches at Laurel Hill, which required them to move through a grove of gnarled, splintered dead pine trees. The attacks were repulsed with severe losses. Grant was thus forced to postpone his 5 p.m. coordinated assault until Warren could get his troops reformed.

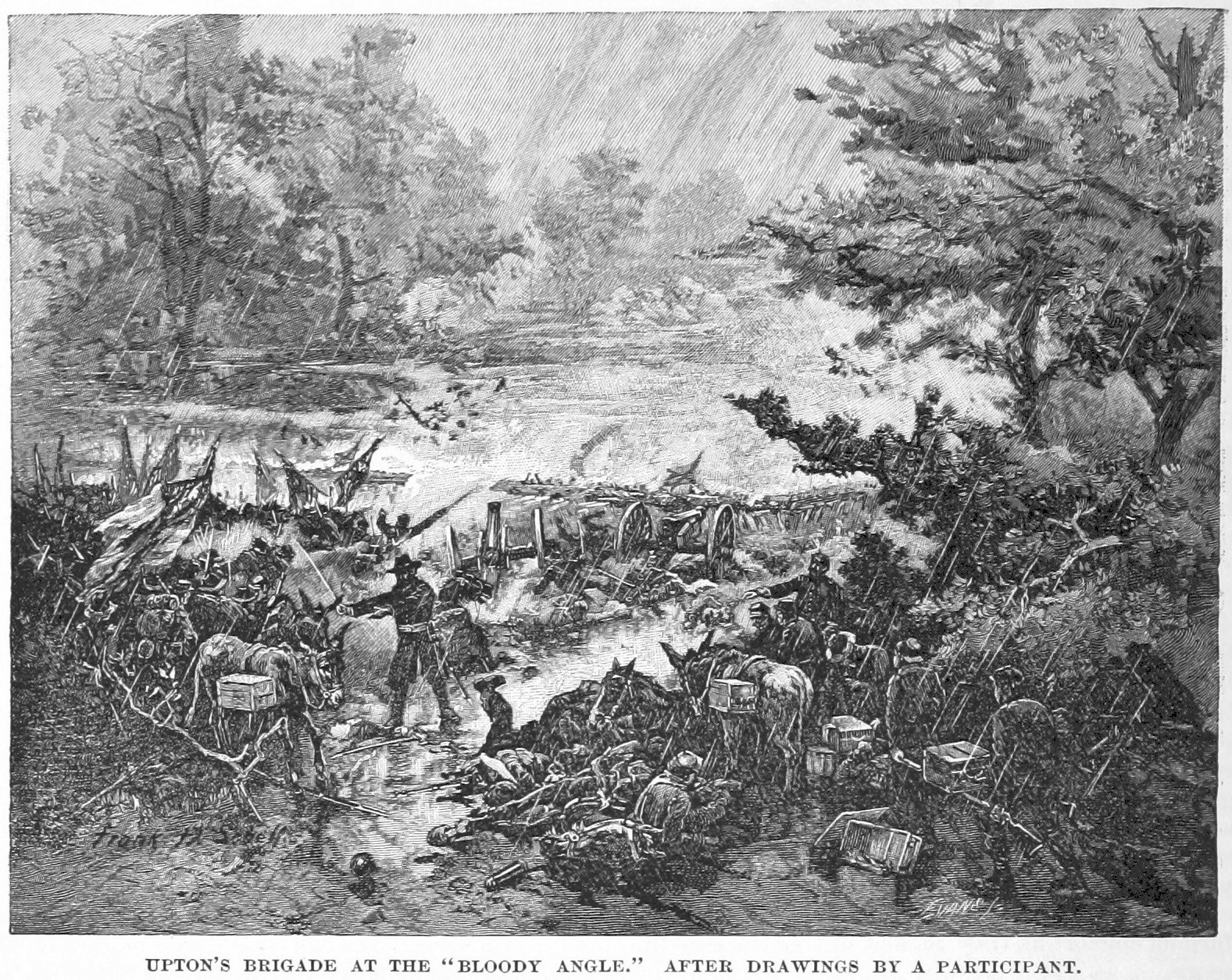
Upton's brigade attacks

At around 6 p.m., the VI Corps began its attack with an unusual formation. Col. Emory Upton led a group of 12 hand-picked regiments, about 5,000 men in four battle lines, against an identified weak point on the west side of the Mule Shoe called Doles's Salient (named after Brig. Gen. George P. Doles's Georgian troops who were manning that sector of the line). The plan was for Upton's men to rush across the open field without pausing to fire and reload, reaching the earthworks before the Confederates could fire more than a couple of shots.

Once an initial breakthrough was made by the leading element, the following lines would widen the breach and spread out on each side. Gershom Mott's division was designated to support the breakthrough as well. Mott's division (4th Division, II Corps) was the weakest in the army. Once Joe Hooker's command, it had been transferred from the defunct III Corps two months earlier. The morale of the enlisted men suffered from this, and several of its regiments' enlistment terms were about to expire in a few weeks, making the men extremely gun-shy. They had been badly shot up and routed in the Wilderness, and as they headed towards the Confederate entrenchments, a burst of artillery fire caused the men to panic and flee from the field, never getting closer than a quarter of a mile to the enemy position.

Three days later, Mott's division was dissolved and Mott himself demoted to command of a brigade comprising most of the remaining troops from the division. Upton's men encountered stiff Confederate resistance, but drove all the way to the parapets, where after some brief, fierce hand-to-hand action, their superior numbers carried the day and soon the Confederate defenders were driven from their trenches.

Generals Lee and Ewell were quick to organize a vigorous counterattack with brigades from all sectors of the Mule Shoe, and no Union supporting units arrived. Mott had already been repulsed, unbeknownst to Upton, and units from Warren's V Corps were too spent from their earlier attacks on Laurel Hill to help. Upton's men were driven out of the Confederate works and he reluctantly ordered them to retreat. British military historian Charles Francis Atkinson wrote in 1908 that Upton's charge was "one of the classic infantry attacks of military history." Grant promoted Upton to brigadier general for his performance.

Also at 6 p.m., on the Union left flank, Burnside advanced along the Fredericksburg Road. Both he and Grant were unaware that when Lee had moved units to the Po, he had left only Cadmus Wilcox's Confederate division to defend that avenue of approach and that there was a large gap between Wilcox and Ewell. (This lack of information was a tangible consequence of the decision to send all of Sheridan's cavalry away from the battlefield.) As Burnside began to get resistance from Wilcox, he timidly stopped and entrenched. That evening Grant decided that Burnside was too isolated from the rest of the line and ordered him to pull back behind the Ni and move to join his lines with Wright's. Grant wrote about this significant lost opportunity in his Personal Memoirs:

Burnside on the left had got up to within a few hundred yards of Spottsylvania Court House, completely turning Lee's right. He was not aware of the importance of the advantage he had gained, and I, being with the troops where the heavy fighting was, did not know of it at the time. He had gained his position with but little fighting, and almost without loss. Burnside's position now separated him widely from Wright's corps, the corps nearest to him. At night he was ordered to join on to this. This brought him back about a mile, and lost to us an important advantage. I attach no blame to Burnside for this, but I do to myself for not having had a staff officer with him to report to me his position.

— Gen. Ulysses Grant

=== May 11: Planning for the grand assault ===
Despite his reverses on May 10, Grant had reason for optimism. The one bright spot in the day had been the partial success of Emory Upton's innovative assault. He recognized the failure stemming from the lack of support and reasoned that using the same tactics with an entire corps might be successful. Grant was then visited by General Wright, the new commander of the VI Corps, who suggested that the May 10 assaults had failed due to poor support, particularly from Mott's division. Wright told General Meade, "General, I don't want Mott's troops on my left; they are not a support. I would rather have no troops there."

He assigned Hancock's II Corps to the assault on the Mule Shoe, while Burnside's IX Corps attacked the eastern end of the salient and Warren's V Corps and Wright's VI Corps applied pressure to Laurel Hill. On the morning of May 11, Grant sent a famous message to the Secretary of War Edwin M. Stanton: "The result to this time is much in our favor. Our losses have been heavy as well as those of the enemy. ... I propose to fight it out on this line if it takes all summer."

Although no major combat action occurred on May 11, small-scale skirmishing and artillery fire continued most of the day.

On the Confederate side, Lee received some intelligence reports that made him believe Grant was planning to withdraw toward Fredericksburg. If this came to pass, he wanted to follow up with an immediate attack. Concerned about the mobility of his artillery to support the potential attack, he ordered that the guns be withdrawn from Allegheny Johnson's division in the Mule Shoe to be ready for a movement to the right. He was completely unaware, of course, that this was exactly the place Grant intended to attack.

Hancock's men began assembling near the Brown farm that evening, about 1200 yards north of the Mule Shoe, in a torrential rainstorm. The men and junior officers were poorly prepared for the assault, lacking basic information about the nature of the ground to be covered, the obstacles to expect, or how the Confederate line was configured. Confederates could hear their preparations through the storm, but could not decide whether an attack was imminent or the Union Army was preparing to withdraw. Allegheny Johnson became suspicious and requested to Ewell that his artillery be returned. Ewell agreed, but somehow the order did not reach the artillery units until 3:30 a.m. on May 12, 30 minutes before Hancock's assault was planned to start.

=== May 12: The Bloody Angle ===
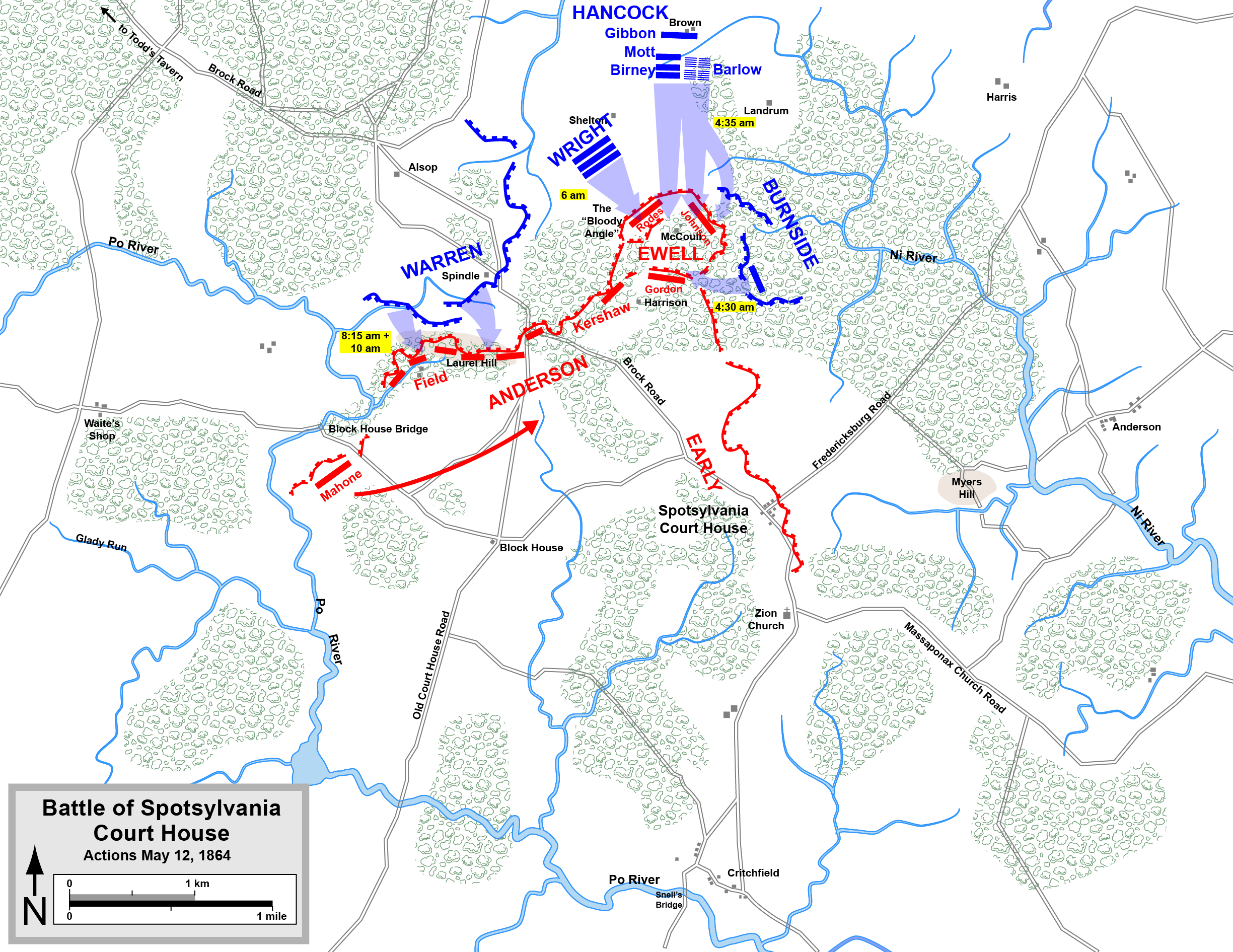
Grant's grand assault, May 12

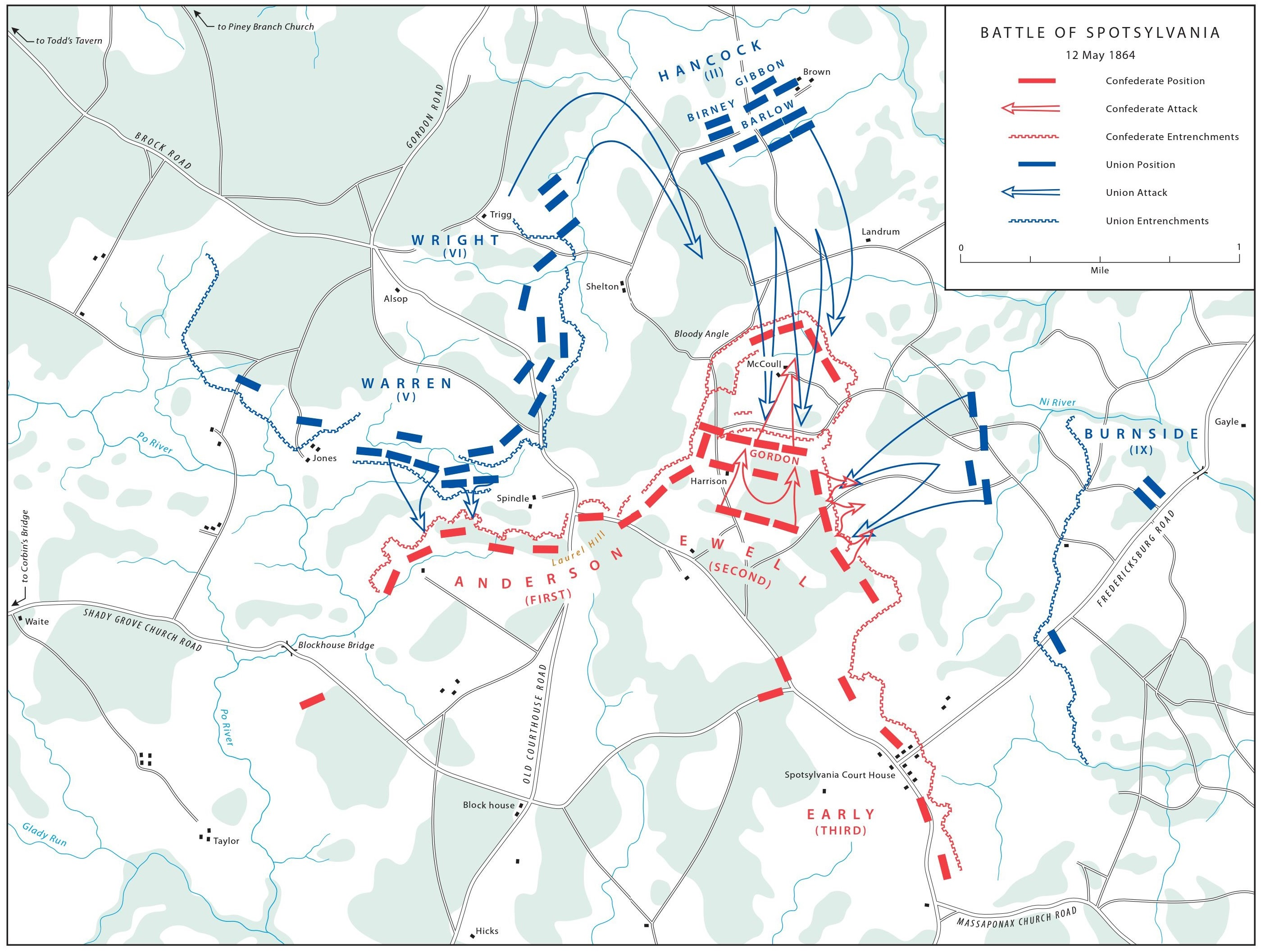
Grant's grand assault, May 12 (additional map)

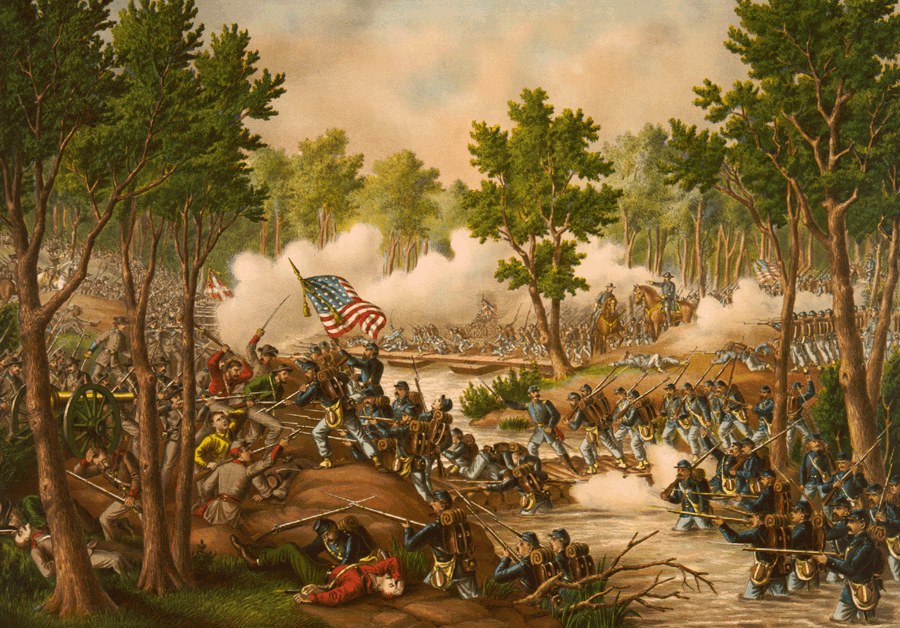
"The Battle of Spottsylvania" by Kurz & Allison

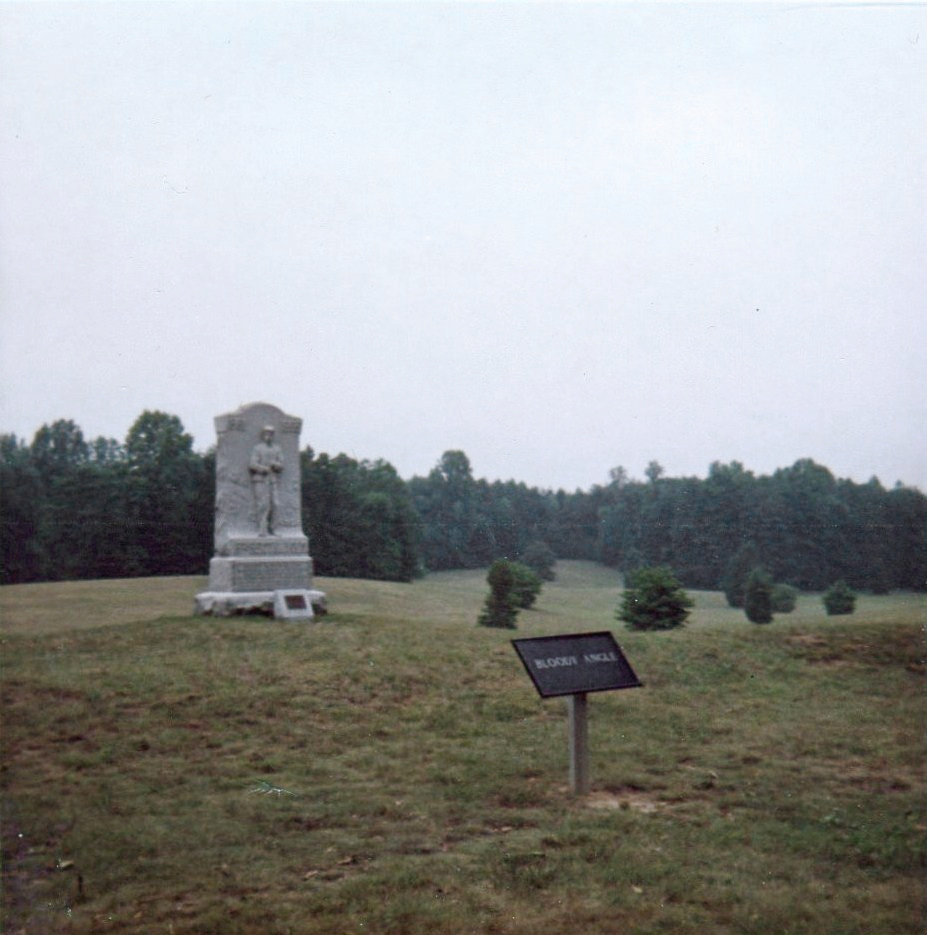
The Bloody Angle site

Hancock's assault was scheduled to commence at 4 a.m., but it was still pitch black and he delayed until 4:35, when the rain stopped and was replaced by a thick mist. The attack crashed through the Confederate works, virtually destroying Jones's Brigade, now commanded by Col. William Witcher. As Barlow's division swung around to the eastern tip of the Mule Shoe, it overran the brigade commanded by Brig. Gen. George "Maryland" Steuart, capturing both Steuart and his division commander, Allegheny Johnson. On Barlow's right, Brig. Gen. David B. Birney's division met stronger resistance from the brigades of Col. William Monaghan and Brig. Gen. James A. Walker (the Stonewall Brigade).

The recent rain had ruined much of the Confederates' gunpowder, but they fought fiercely hand to hand. The Union troops continued to spread south along the western edge of the Mule Shoe. Despite the initial success at obliterating much of the Mule Shoe salient, there was a flaw in the Union plan—no one had considered how to capitalize on the breakthrough. The 15,000 infantrymen of Hancock's II Corps had crowded into a narrow front about a half mile wide and soon lost all unit cohesion, becoming little more than an armed mob.

Following the initial shock, the Confederate leadership at all levels began to react well to the Union onslaught. John B. Gordon sent Brig. Gen. Robert D. Johnston's brigade of North Carolinians racing toward the gap where Steuart's men had collapsed. Although Johnston was wounded, his brigade halted the breakthrough in that sector. Gordon then sent forward the brigade of Col. John S. Hoffman and three regiments from Col. Clement A. Evans's brigade.

General Lee was at the scene to witness these men moving forward and, similar to his action at the Widow Tapp farm in the Battle of the Wilderness, he attempted to move forward with the men, only to be stopped by Gordon and chants from the men, "Lee to the rear!" These brigades were able to secure most of the eastern leg of the Mule Shoe after about 30 minutes of fierce fighting. On the western leg, Maj. Gen. Robert E. Rodes coordinated the defense and the brigade of Brig. Gen. Stephen D. Ramseur suffered heavy casualties as they fought their way to regain the entrenchments lost by the Stonewall Brigade.

Grant sent in reinforcements at about 6:30 a.m., ordering both Wright and Warren to move forward. The VI Corps division of Brig. Gen. Thomas H. Neill headed for the western leg of the Mule Shoe, at the point where it turned to the south. This sector of the line, where the heaviest fighting of the day would occur, became known as the "Bloody Angle." As Union brigade after brigade slammed into the line, William Mahone brought two of his brigades—under Brig. Gens. Abner M. Perrin and Nathaniel H. Harris—hurrying back from the extreme left flank to come to Ramseur's aid. Perrin was killed. By 8 a.m, heavy rain began to fall and both sides fought on the earthworks slippery with both water and blood. The South Carolinians of Brig. Gen. Samuel McGowan's brigade joined the defense at the critical point. At 9:30 a.m., the VI Corps division under Brig. Gen. David A. Russell joined the attack. A section of Union artillery was able to advance close to the Confederate lines and cause numerous casualties. But Confederate artillery also had a severe effect on the advance of Russell's men.

Warren's attack at Laurel Hill began on a small scale around 8:15 a.m. For some of his men, this was their fourth or fifth attack against the same objective and few fought with enthusiasm. After thirty minutes the attack petered out and Warren told Meade that he was not able to advance "at present." The irascible Meade ordered Warren to attack "at once at all hazards with your whole force, if necessary." Warren relayed the order to his division commanders: "Do it. Don't mind the consequences." The attack was yet another failure, adding to the high toll of casualties as the Union corps was held up by the fire of a single Confederate division.

Not only was the V Corps unable to take its objective, it had also failed to draw Confederate troops from elsewhere in the line, as Grant had intended. Both Meade and Grant were upset with Warren's performance and Grant authorized Meade to relieve Warren, replacing him with Meade's chief of staff, Maj. Gen. Andrew A. Humphreys. Humphreys diplomatically coordinated the withdrawal of the V Corps units without relieving Warren, but Meade began to order Warren's subordinates to reinforce Wright, and no further attacks against Laurel Hill would be planned.

Ambrose Burnside was also part of the grand assault, advancing against the eastern leg of the Mule Shoe before dawn. The attack by his division under Brig. Gen. Robert B. Potter against the sector just below Steuart's Brigade materially aided Hancock's breakthrough. The North Carolina brigade of Brig. Gen. James H. Lane fought back, reinforced by a Georgia brigade under Brig. Gen. Edward L. Thomas and the North Carolina brigade of Brig. Gen. Alfred M. Scales. The two sides became stalemated. At 2 p.m., Grant and Lee coincidentally ordered simultaneous attacks. Grant considered this sector to be lightly defended and hoped for a new breakthrough while Lee wanted to take out an artillery position that the IX Corps was using to harass his line. The advance by Union Brig. Gen. Orlando B. Willcox's division against a minor salient in the line was stopped as Lane's brigade moved forward and hit them in the flank.

The appalling sight presented was harrowing in the extreme. Our own killed were scattered over a large space near the "angle," while in front of the captured breastworks the enemy's dead, vastly more numerous than our own, were piled upon each other in some places four layers deep, exhibiting every ghastly phase of mutilation. Below the mass of fast-decaying corpses, the convulsive twitching of limbs and the writhing of bodies showed that there were wounded men still alive and struggling to extricate themselves from the horrid entombment. Every relief possible was afforded, but in too many cases it came too late. The place was well named the "Bloody Angle."

— Grant's aide Horace Porter, Campaigning with Grant

"It was a bright May day. There was no fighting on any part of the line, and by permission I went. The pickets permitted me to pass, and I went over the breastworks to that portion of the field which had been occupied by Ramseur's Brigade. On my arrival in this angle, I could well see why the enemy had withdrawn their lines. The stench was almost unbearable. There was dead artillery horses in considerable numbers that had been killed on the 10th and in the early morning of the 12th. Along these lines of breastworks where the earth had been excavated to the depth of one or two feet and thrown over, making the breastworks, I found these trenches filled with water (for there had been much rain) and in this water lay the dead bodies of friend and foe commingled, in many instances one laying across the other, and in one or more instances I saw as many as three lying across one another. All over the field lay the dead of both armies by hundreds, many of them mangled by shells. Many of the bodies swollen out of all proportion, some with their guns yet grasped in their hands. Now and then one could be seen covered with a blanket, which had been placed over him by a comrade after he had fallen. These bodies were decaying. The water was red, almost black with blood. Offensive flies were everywhere. The trees, saplings and shrubs were torn and shattered beyond description; guns, some of them broken, bayonets, canteens and cartridge boxes were scattered about, and the whole scene was such that no pen can, or ever will describe it. I have seen many fields after severe conflicts, but no where have I seen anything half so ghastly. I returned to my company and said to old man Thomas Carroll, a private in the company, who was frying meat at a fire, You would have saved rations by going with me, for I will have no more appetite for a week."

— Sgt. Cyrus Watson, Company K, 45th North Carolina Infantry

Throughout the afternoon, Confederate engineers scrambled to create a new defensive line 500 yards further south at the base of the Mule Shoe, while fighting at the Bloody Angle continued day and night with neither side achieving an advantage, until around 12:00 a.m. on May 13, the fighting finally stopped. At 4 a.m., the exhausted Confederate infantrymen were notified that the new line was ready and they withdrew from the original earthworks unit by unit.

The combat they had endured for almost 24 hours was characterized by an intensity of firepower never previously seen in Civil War battles, as the entire landscape was flattened, all the foliage destroyed. An example of this can be found in the Smithsonian Museum of American History: a 22-inch stump of an oak tree at the Bloody Angle that was completely severed by rifle fire, believed to have been caused by fire from the 24th Michigan Infantry Regiment and the 6th Wisconsin Infantry Regiment of the Union Iron Brigade. There was a frenzy to the carnage on both sides. Fighting back and forth over the same corpse-strewn trenches for hours on end, using single shot muskets, the contending troops were periodically reduced to hand-to-hand combat reminiscent of battles fought during ancient times. Bodies piled up four and five high, and soldiers were forced to pause from time to time and throw corpses over the parapet since they formed an obstacle in the way of the fighting. Dead and wounded men were shot so many times that many of them simply fell apart into unrecognizable heaps of flesh.

Surviving participants attempted to describe in letters, diaries, and memoirs the hellish intensity of that day, many noting that it was beyond words. Or, as one put it: "Nothing can describe the confusion, the savage, blood-curdling yells, the murderous faces, the awful curses, and the grisly horror of the melee." Some men claimed to have fired as many as 400 rounds that day. May 12 was the most intensive day of fighting during the battle, with Union casualties of about 9,000, Confederate 8,000; the Confederate loss includes about 3,000 prisoners captured in the Mule Shoe.

=== May 13–16: Reorienting the lines ===
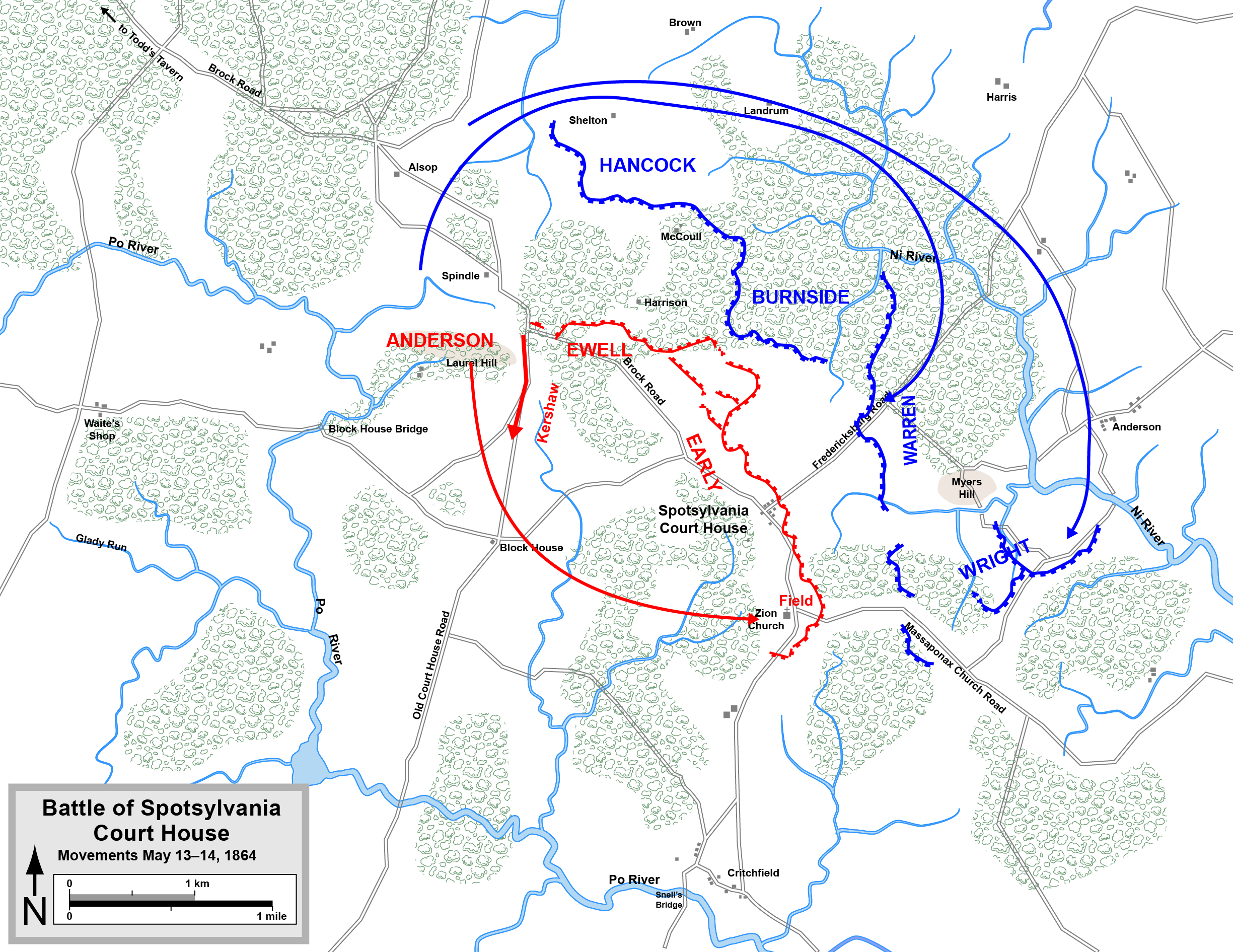
Reorienting the lines, May 13–16

Despite the significant casualties of May 12, Grant was undeterred. He telegraphed to the Army's chief of staff, Maj. Gen. Henry W. Halleck, "The enemy are obstinate and seemed to have found the last ditch." He planned to reorient his lines and shift the center of potential action to the east of Spotsylvania, where he could renew the battle. He ordered the V and VI Corps to move behind the II Corps and take positions past the left flank of the IX Corps.

On the night of May 13–14, the corps began a difficult march in heavy rain over treacherously muddy roads. Early on May 14, elements of the VI Corps occupied Myers Hill, which overlooked most of the Confederate line. Col. Emory Upton's brigade skirmished most of the day to retain possession of the high ground. Grant's command was too scattered and exhausted to undertake an assault against Spotsylvania Court House on May 14, despite Lee having left it practically undefended for most of the day. When he realized what Grant was up to, Lee shifted some units from Anderson's First Corps to that area. Grant notified Washington that, having endured five days of almost continuous rain, his army could not resume offensive operations until they had 24 hours of dry weather.

=== May 17–18: Final Union attacks ===
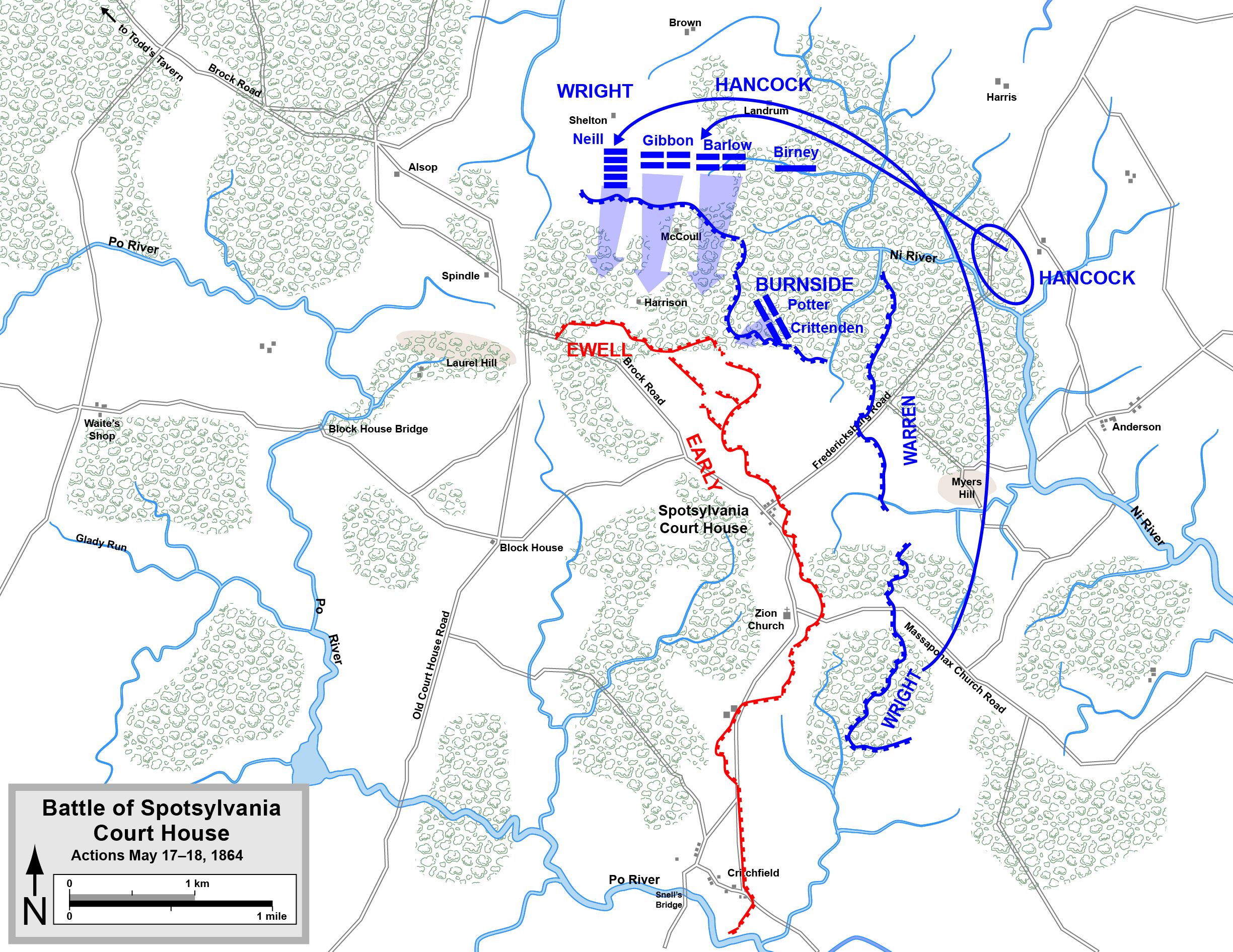
Movements, May 17, final Union attacks, May 18

The weather finally cleared on May 17. Grant made an assumption that led him to his next attack plan: since Lee had observed Grant's buildup along the Fredericksburg Road, it was likely that he had countered the Union moves by shifting his forces away from the former Mule Shoe positions. He ordered the II Corps and the VI Corps to attack there at sunrise, May 18. They retraced their steps to the vicinity of the Landrum house the night of May 17. Hancock's II Corps would make the primary assault with support from Wright on their right and Burnside on their left.

Unfortunately for the Union plan, the former Confederate works were still occupied by Ewell's Second Corps and they had used the intervening time to improve the earthworks and the obstacles laid out in front of them. And, unlike May 12, they were not caught by surprise, nor had they sent their artillery away. As Hancock's men advanced, they were caught up in an abatis and subjected to artillery fire so devastating that infantry rifle fire was not necessary to repulse the attack. Wright and Burnside had no better luck.

=== May 19: Harris Farm ===
Confederate dead from the Harris farm engagement
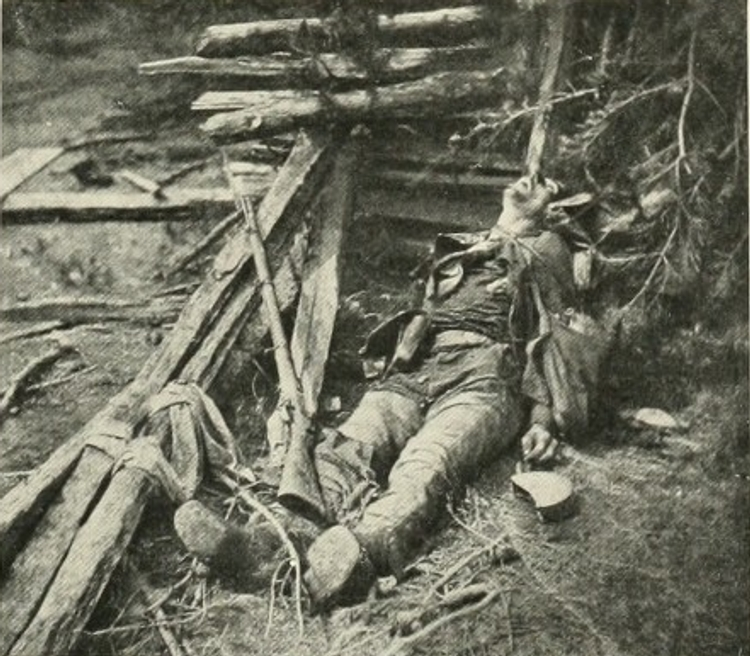
This unidentified, dead Confederate soldier of Ewell's Corps was killed during their attack at Alsop's farm. He was wounded in both the right knee and left shoulder, and probably died from loss of blood.

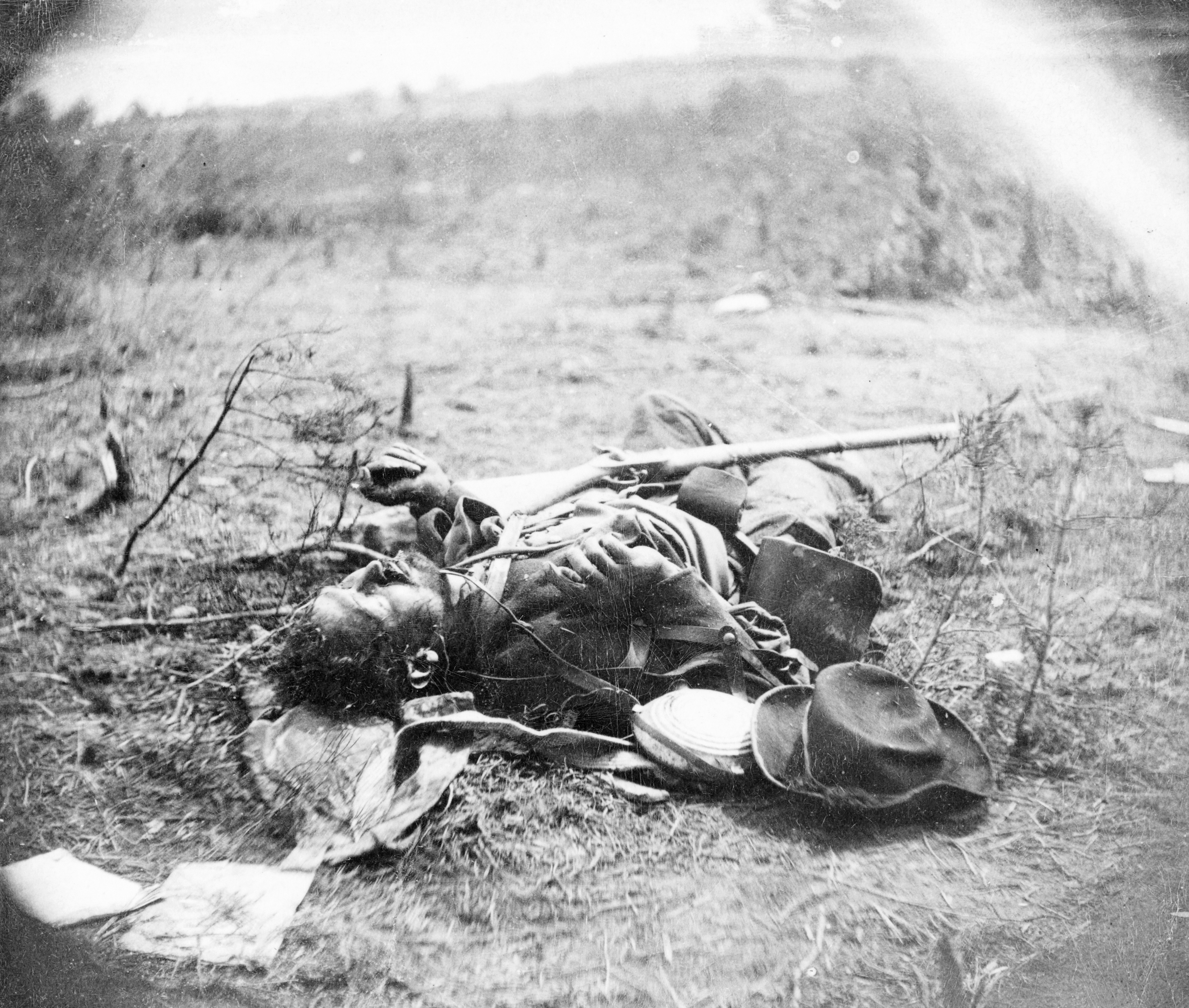
Confederate killed in Ewell's attack May 19, 1864, on the Alsop farm. This photograph was taken just to the right and in front of the preceding photograph.

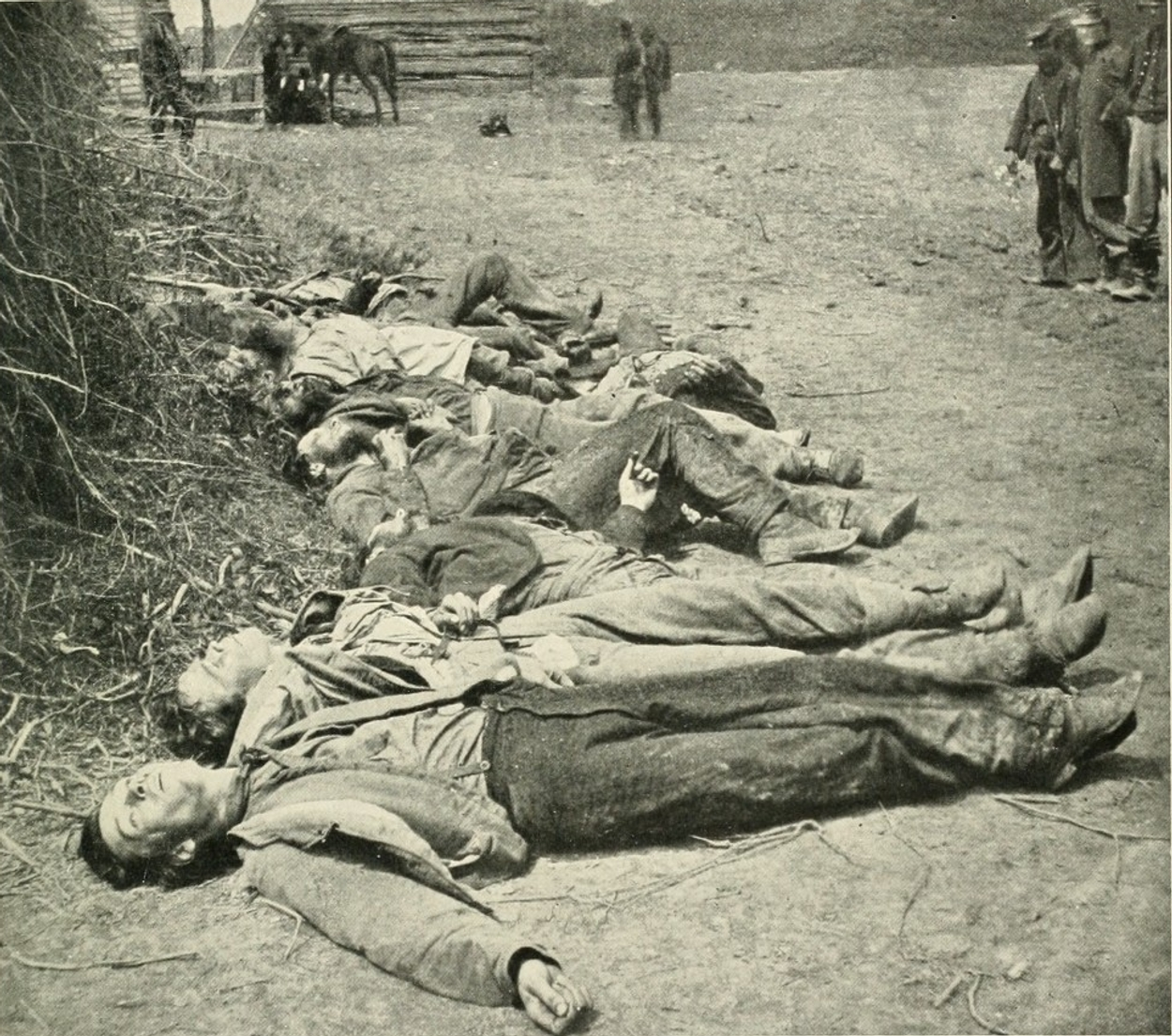
Confederate dead of General Ewell's Corps who attacked the Union lines on May 19 lined up for burial at the Alsop Farm

Grant reacted to this final repulse by deciding to abandon this general area as a battlefield. He ordered Hancock's II Corps to march to the railroad line between Fredericksburg and Richmond, and then turn south. With luck, Lee might take the bait and follow, seeking to overwhelm and destroy the isolated corps. In that case, Grant would chase Lee with his remaining corps and strike him before the Confederates could entrench again.

Lee was engaged in his own planning, however. Before Hancock began to move, Lee ordered Ewell to conduct a reconnaissance in force to locate the northern flank of the Union army. Ewell took the majority of his Second Corps divisions under Rodes and Gordon up the Brock Road, and swung widely to the north and east to the Harris farm. There they encountered several units of Union heavy artillery soldiers who had recently been converted to infantry duty.

Fighting commenced against these relatively green troops, who were soon reinforced by the 1st Maryland Regiment and then David Birney's infantry division. The fighting lasted until about 9 p.m. and Lee, concerned that Ewell was risking a general engagement while separated from the main army, recalled his men. A number of them lost their way in the dark and were captured. The Confederates had lost over 900 men on a pointless skirmish that could have been assigned to a small cavalry detachment.

== Aftermath ==
Grant's intended advance of Hancock's corps was delayed by the Harris farm engagement, so the troops did not begin their movement south until the night of May 20–21. Lee did not fall into Grant's trap of attacking Hancock, but traveled on a parallel path to the North Anna River. The Overland Campaign continued as Grant attempted several more times to engage Lee, found himself stymied by strong defensive positions, and moved again around Lee's flank in the direction of Richmond. Major engagements occurred at the Battle of North Anna and the Battle of Cold Harbor, after which Grant crossed the James River to attack Petersburg. The armies then faced each other for nine months in the Siege of Petersburg.

== Casualties ==
With almost 32,000 total casualties, Spotsylvania Court House was the costliest battle of the Overland Campaign and one of the top five battles of the Civil War. As at the Battle of the Wilderness, Lee's tactics had inflicted severe casualties on Grant's army. This time, the toll was over 18,000 men, of whom close to 3,000 were killed. In two weeks of fighting since the start of the Wilderness, Grant had lost about 36,000 men, and another 20,000 went home when their enlistments ended. Grant on May 19 had only 56,124 effectives. Lee did not come out of these battles unscathed. At Spotsylvania, he lost another 10–13,000 men, about 23% of his army (versus 18% of Grant's). While the Union had plenty of men to replace Grant's losses, the Confederates were forced to pull men from other fronts to reinforce Lee. Worse, the Confederates lost experienced commanders and veteran soldiers that simply could not be replaced.

Estimates vary as to the casualties at Spotsylvania Court House. The following table summarizes a variety of sources:

Casualty Estimates for the Battle of Spotsylvania Court House
Source	Union				Confederate			
Source	Killed	Wounded	Captured/ Missing	Total	Killed	Wounded	Captured/ Missing	Total
National Park Service				18,000				12,000
Bonekemper, Victor, Not a Butcher	2,725	13,416	2,258	18,399	1,467	6,235	5,719	13,421
Eicher, Longest Night				17,500				10,000
Esposito, West Point Atlas				17–18,000				9–10,000
Fox, Regimental Losses	2,725	13,416	2,258	18,399				
Kennedy, Civil War Battlefield Guide				18,000				9–10,000
Salmon, Virginia Civil War Battlefield Guide				18,000				12,000
Trudeau, Bloody Roads South	2,725	13,416	2,258	18,399	6,519		5,543	12,062
Young, Lee's Army					1,515	5,414	5,758	12,687

Five general officers were killed or mortally wounded during the battle: Union Maj. Gen. John Sedgwick and Brig. Gens. James C. Rice and Thomas G. Stevenson; and Confederate Brig. Gen. Junius Daniel and Abner M. Perrin. Sedgwick's death is notable in that he was the highest-ranking officer by seniority to die in the war. He also famously said the ironic words "They couldn't hit an elephant at this distance" shortly before his death. Among the wounded and captured were Confederate Maj. Gen. Edward Johnson and Brig. Gens. John R. Cooke, Harry T. Hays, Samuel McGowan, Stephen D. Ramseur, Cullen A. Battle, James A. Walker, Robert D. Johnston, George H. Steuart and Henry H. Walker.

== Medal of Honor ==
Forty-three men received the Medal of Honor during the Battle of Spotsylvania Court House, including Frederick Alber, George W. Harris, John C. Robinson, Archibald Freeman, and Charles H. Tracy.

== Battlefield preservation ==
Portions of the Spotsylvania Court House battlefield are now preserved as part of Fredericksburg and Spotsylvania National Military Park. In addition, the American Battlefield Trust and its partners have acquired and preserved more than 151 acres (0.61 km^{2}) of the battlefield in five different transactions from 1989 to 2023.

== See also ==
- Troop engagements of the American Civil War, 1864
- List of costliest American Civil War land battles
- Armies in the American Civil War
