= Charles H. Tracy =

Union Army Medal of Honor recipient (1833–1911)

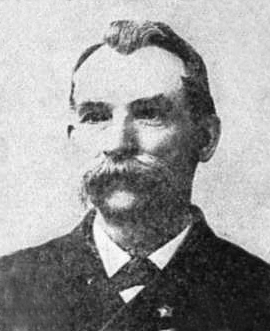
- Born: October 3, 1833; Jewett City, Connecticut
- Died: September 13, 1911 (aged 77); Somerville, Massachusetts
- Burial place: Chicopee, Massachusetts
- Military career
- Allegiance: United States of America
- Branch: United States Army; Union Army
- Service years: August 1862 – July 4, 1865
- Rank: Second Lieutenant
- Units: Company A, 37th Massachusetts Volunteer Infantry
- Awards: Medal of Honor

Charles H. Tracy (October 3, 1833 – September 13, 1911) was an infantry soldier who received the Medal of Honor while serving in the Union Army during the American Civil War for two acts of bravery.

== Early life ==
Tracy was born the son of Albert Tracy and Mrs. Harriet Birch Tracy on October 3, 1833 in Jewett City, Connecticut. After leaving school he learned the machinist trade. He married Mary Elisabeth Corbin in Upton, Massachusetts on December 27, 1853. Around 1853, the couple moved to Chicopee, Massachusetts where they made their home until 1890. Tracy worked in the cotton mills of the Dwight Company and the Ames Manufacturing Company during this period.

== Military career and associations ==
In August, 1862 in Chicopee, Massachusetts, Mr. Tracy enlisted in Company A, 37th Massachusetts Volunteer Infantry which was mustered into service at Pittsfield, Massachusetts on September 4, 1862. He was serving as a sergeant when he performed his first act of bravery on May 12, 1864 during the Battle of Spotsylvania Court House in Virginia.

According to Sgt. Tracy:

At the 'Bloody Angle,' Spotsylvania, May 12th, our corps, the Sixth, supported the Second in the famous charge against [Edward] Johnson's Division of the Confederate Army. During the thickest of the fight, Lieutenant Wellman was badly wounded, and I was ordered to take him to the rear. It was about a mile to the hospital, and the shot and shell came so thick and fast that it was extremely hazardous to venture across with a wounded comrade, but I succeeded in carrying out the order, and after placing the lieutenant in the hospital, I came safely back through the fire. Upon reaching my company, Lieutenant Sparks congratulated me, saying: ' Tracy, I hope you will not have to cross that field on a like errand again.' Scarcely had he finished speaking, when a ball pierced his left breast and he fell into my arms. We thought he was mortally wounded, but discovering signs of life in him, decided to take him to the hospital, without waiting for orders.

His second act of bravery occurred on April 2, 1865 during the Third Battle of Petersburg, also in Virginia.

Sgt. Tracy recounts:

At one o'clock on the morning of April 2, 1865, my regiment broke camp near Petersburg, Va., and moved up to the enemy's front. Brigade pioneers and sharpshooters were ordered to rush in advance of the brigade. The pioneers were to remove all obstacles in front of the enemy's works, while the sharpshooters covered the parapet. I was at that time detailed as sergeant of the Third Brigade pioneers, and was second in command in the assault. The part of the line we were expected to carry was made of enclosed works, connected by breastworks of great strength with outer obstructions in the form of two lines of chevaux de frise and two lines of abatis. It was impossible to take the works while the enemy defended them, unless the several lines of obstruction were first removed. As Lieutenant Shiver was wounded early in the attack the command fell on me, and in directing the removal of the first two lines of the obstructions I received a shot over my ear and one in my left side; and while removing the third line, a bullet shattered my right knee-joint, costing me, subsequently, the loss of my leg. Supporting myself on the abatis, I gave my orders to my men, and at last had the satisfaction of seeing them carry away the obstruction, thus enabling General Edwards to rout the enemy and cut the railroad and telegraph. The flag of the Thirty-seventh Massachusetts was the first to wave over the enemy's works.

He was subsequently promoted to the rank of second lieutenant in recognition of his bravery.

He was a charter member of the Otis Chapman Post 103 of the Grand Army of the Republic of Chicopee, of which he was adjutant in 1881 and commander during the three succeeding years. In 1884, he was a member of the Department Council of Administration; and, in 1891, he transferred his membership from the Chicopee Post to Abraham Lincoln Post 11 of Charlestown. He was also a member and former president of the Thirty-Seventh Massachusetts Regiment Association.

== Medal of Honor citation ==
His Medal of Honor was awarded to him on November 19, 1897 with a citation that reads "At the risk of his own life, at Spotsylvania, 12 May 1864, assisted in carrying to a place of safety a wounded and helpless officer. On 2 April 1865, advanced with the pioneers, and, under heavy fire, assisted in removing 2 lines of chevaux-de-frise; was twice wounded but advanced to the third line, where he was again severely wounded, losing a leg."

== Post-military life ==
From 1888 to 1890 Tracy was employed at the United States arsenal in Springfield, Massachusetts. In 1890, he moved to Boston, Massachusetts and was a night watchman at the Custom House Tower for sixteen years until the spring of 1906, when he was compelled by ill health to give up active life. During his employment at the Custom House Tower, he made his home in Charlestown, Massachusetts where he was well known and highly respected. Following the death of his wife on March 6, 1905, and his retirement from the custom house, he then moved to Somerville, Massachusetts in 1907, where he lived the rest of his life until his death in 1911. The final years of his life were spent as an invalid. He spent the final ten days of his life at home in critical condition before succumbing to the effects of a stroke on September 13, 1911.

== See also ==
- List of Medal of Honor recipients
