= Abner Monroe Perrin =

Confederate States Army officer (1827–1864)

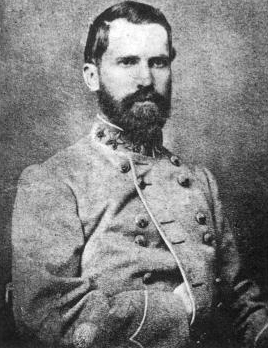
- Perrin in uniform, c. 1862
- Born: February 8, 1827; Edgefield District, South Carolina, U.S.
- Died: May 12, 1864 (aged 37); Spotsylvania County, Virginia
- Burial place: Confederate Cemetery, Fredericksburg, Virginia, U.S.
- Education: Bethany Academy
- Spouse: Emily Butler (m. 1851)
- Children: 2
- Relatives: Robert O. Perrin (brother)
- Military career
- Allegiance: United States; Confederate States
- Branch: United States Army; Confederate States Army
- Service years: 1846–1848 (U.S.); 1861–1864 (C.S.)
- Rank: First Lieutenant (U.S.); Brigadier-General (C.S.)
- Commands: 14th South Carolina Infantry Regiment (1863); Perrin's Brigade (1863–64)
- Battles: Mexican–American War; American Civil War; Seven Days Battle; Battle of Cedar Mountain; Battle of Second Manassas; Battle of Antietam; Battle of Fredericksburg; Battle of Gettysburg; Battle of the Wilderness; Battle of Spotsylvania Court House †

Abner Monroe Perrin (February 2, 1827 – May 12, 1864) was an American lawyer who served as a senior officer of the Confederate States Army. He commanded infantry in the Eastern Theater of the American Civil War until killed in action at Spotsylvania Court House.

== Early life and education ==
Perrin was born in the Edgefield District, South Carolina. He fought in the Mexican–American War as a first lieutenant of infantry. Upon his return home, he studied law and was admitted to the bar in 1854.

== American Civil War ==
When the Civil War began, Perrin entered the Confederate service as a captain in the 14th South Carolina Infantry Regiment that was attached to Brigadier-General Maxcy Gregg's brigade of the famous "Light Division" of Major-General A.P. Hill.

Perrin saw service with Gregg's Brigade through all of its major battles, including the Seven Days, Cedar Mountain, Battle of Second Manassas, Antietam, and Fredericksburg. When Gregg's successor, Samuel McGowan, was wounded at Chancellorsville, Perrin took command of the brigade and led it at the subsequent Battle of Gettysburg in the division of Major General William D. Pender in Hill's new Third Corps. At Gettysburg, on July 1, 1863, Perrin's Brigade was involved in the Confederate attack that captured Seminary Ridge. On September 10, 1863, Perrin was promoted to the rank of brigadier-general. Upon the return of McGowan, Perrin was transferred to command the Alabama brigade previously led by Brigadier-General Cadmus Wilcox in the division of Major-General Richard H. Anderson (Wilcox had been appointed to command the division of Pender, who had died from a wound received at Gettysburg).

Perrin was conspicuously brave at the Battle of the Wilderness in May 1864. In the next battle, Spotsylvania Court House, he declared "I shall come out of this fight a live major general or a dead brigadier." When the "Mule Shoe" (or "Bloody Angle") was overrun and most of Major-General Allegheny Johnson's division was captured on May 12, 1864, units from the Third Corps—including Perrin's Brigade—were called in to help. Leading his troops in a spirited counterattack through a very heavy fire, with his sword in hand, Perrin was riddled with bullets and died instantly, shot seven times. He is buried in the Confederate Cemetery in Fredericksburg, Virginia.

== Honors ==
Camp No. 367, of the United Confederate Veterans, at Edgefield Court House, South Carolina, was named after him.

== See also ==
- List of Confederate States Army generals
