= 1st South Carolina Rifle Regiment =

1st (Orr's) South Carolina Rifle Regiment
- Flag of South Carolina
- Active: July 20, 1861, to April 10, 1865
- Country: Confederate States of America
- Allegiance: CSA
- Branch: Confederate States Army
- Type: Infantry
- Engagements: American Civil War: Seven Days Battles; Beaver Dam Creek; Gaines' Mill; Frayser's Farm; Cedar Mountain; Manassas Station Operations; Second Manassas; Ox Hill; Harpers Ferry; Sharpsburg; Shepherdstown; Fredericksburg; Chancellorsville; Gettysburg; Bristoe Station; Mine Run; The Wilderness; Spotsylvania Court House; North Anna; Cold Harbor; Petersburg Siege; Jerusalem Plank Road; Fussell's Mill; Second Ream's Station; Peebles' Farm; Boydton Plank Road; Third Petersburg; Appomattox Campaign

Orr's Rifles was a South Carolina infantry regiment that served in the Confederate States Army during the American Civil War.

== History ==
=== Formation ===
On 20 July 1861, James Lawrence Orr organized the First South Carolina Rifle Regiment at Sandy Springs. He was elected Colonel; J. Foster Marshall was elected Lt. Colonel, and Daniel A. Ledbetter, Major. Ten companies were recruited in the following districts (counties were known as districts between 1800 & 1868).

Company: Nickname	District	Captain
A: "the Keowee Riflemen"	Pickens	J.W. Livingston
B: "McDuffie's Guards"	Abbeville	James Perrin
C: "the Mountain Boys"	Pickens	J.J. Norton
D: "Orr's Rifles"	Anderson	Frank E. Harrison
E: "the Oconee Riflemen"	Pickens	Miles M. Norton
F: "the Blue Ridge Rifles"	Pickens	Robert A. Hawthorne
G: "the Marshall Riflemen"	Abbeville	G. McDuffie Miller
H: "the Pee Dee Guards"	Marion	George M. Fairlee
I: not created
K: "the Marshall Guards"	Anderson	George W. Cox
L: "the Calhoun Guards"	Anderson	John B. Moore

The regiment had seen no action by the time Orr left, but the name "Orr's Rifles" stuck throughout the war.

=== Initial duty ===
First posted to Sullivan's Island, SC to defend Charleston Harbor, others called them the "Pound Cake Regiment" in reference to their "light" garrison duty. The 20th SC Infantry was referred to as the "Poundcake Brigade" on account of limited engagements and they were so close to home, their families could bring them poundcake or other treats.

=== Transfer to Army of Northern Virginia ===
In April 1862, the full-strength 1,000-man unit was transferred to Robert E. Lee's Army of Northern Virginia (ANV). In June, it was incorporated into Gregg's Brigade, of A.P. Hill's Light Division, of Thomas J. "Stonewall" Jackson Corps (often termed the "Left Wing" early in the war).

=== Surrender ===
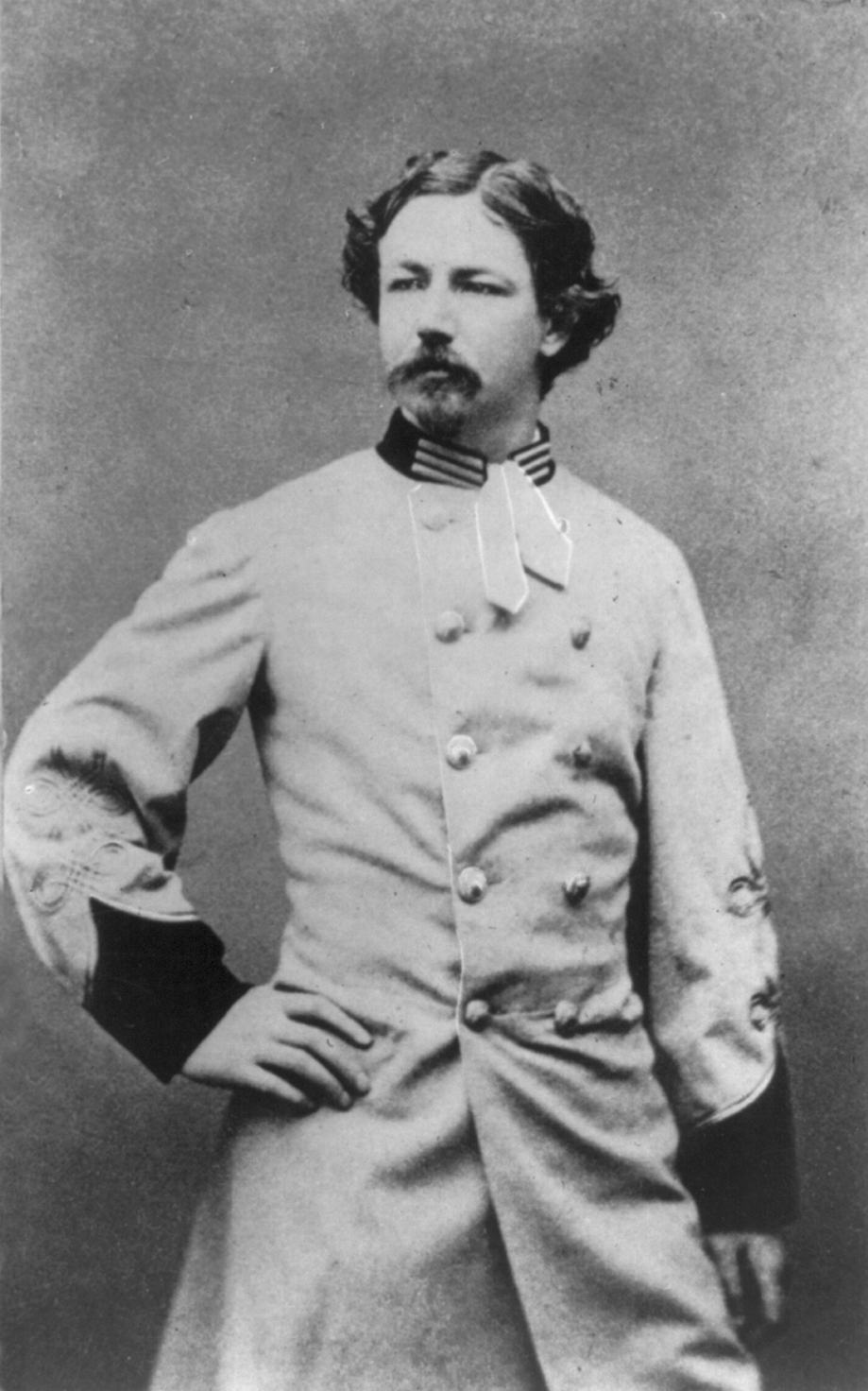
Dr. William McNeill Whistler of the 1st S.C.R.R.

Lee surrendered the ANV, including Orr's Rifles, at Appomattox Court House on 9 April 1865. After three years of combat, the regiment comprised 9 officers and 148 enlisted men.

== Flags ==
The regiment was known to have carried 3 flags during the War. The first was given to the regiment was on February 25th, 1861. It had a white silk field with the states coat of arms in the center. The second flag was presented to the regiment on October 4th of the same year. It had a blue field with a palmetto in the center and a crescent moon in the corner both in white. Around the top of the palmetto tree are the words "FIRST REGIMENT OF RIFLES, SoCa. VOLUNTEERS," in gold. At the based of the tree is the date "OCT. 4-1861." The third flag was carried into the Battle of Malvern Hill and it bore a blue field with a red palmetto in the center, unknown when it was made.

== See also ==
- List of South Carolina Confederate Civil War units
