= 14th Tennessee Infantry Regiment =

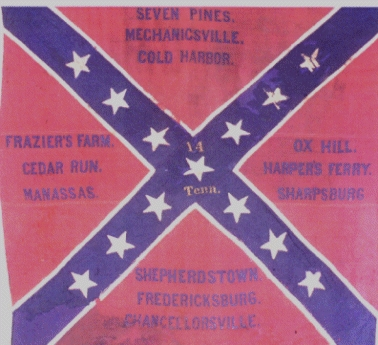
- Active: May 1861 – April, 1865
- Country: Confederate States of America
- Allegiance: Confederate States Army
- Branch: Infantry
- Type: Regiment
- Engagements: American Civil War: Battle of Seven Pines; Battle of Mechanicsville; Battle of Shepherdstown; Battle of Ox Hill; Battle of Cedar Mountain; Second Battle of Manassas; Battle of Sharpsburg; Battle of Harper's Ferry; Battle of Frazier's Farm; Battle of Fredericksburg; Battle of Chancellorsville; Battle of Gettysburg; Battle of Williamsport; Battle of Bristoe Station; Battle of Mine Run; Battle of the Wilderness; Battle of Spotsylvania; Battle of Cold Harbor; Siege of Petersburg; Battle of Globe Tavern; Battle of Weldon Railroad; Second Battle of Ream's Station; Battle of Burgess Mill; Battle of Hatcher's Run; Battle of Appomattox Court House (surrendered)

Commanders
- Notable commanders: Col. William McComb (later Brig. Gen)

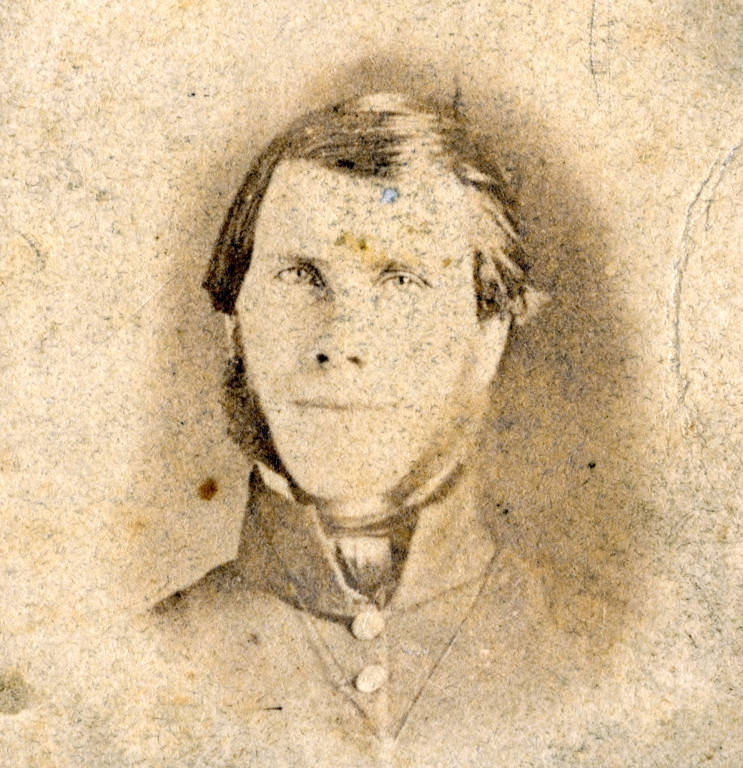
William Archibald Forbes, ca. 1855

The 14th Tennessee Infantry Regiment was a unit of the Confederate States Army during the American Civil War. It was one of the few western regiments that fought as part of the Army of Northern Virginia in the east; participating in most major battles conducted by Robert E. Lee.

== Service history ==
The 14th Tennessee was organized and drilled at Camp Duncan near Clarksville in May 1861 by Col. William A. Forbes, Almost immediately it received orders transferring it to the Virginia theatre where the regiment would remain for the duration of the war and served with distinction in the Army of Northern Virginia, until its final capitulation.

The regiment served in James J. Archer's famed "Tennessee Brigade" assigned to A.P. Hill's Light Division. Hill's men earned a hard won reputation for making critical counterattacks preserving Confederate victories at Cedar Mountain, Second Manassas and Sharpsburg. At Manassas Col. Forbes was mortally wounded and succeeded by William McComb; who'd become a Brigadier General in 1865. The 14th had fought at Seven Pines, Mechanicsville, Shepherdstown, Ox Hill, Harper's Ferry, Frazier's Farm, Fredericksburg and Chancellorsville. At the later the brigade seized the critical high ground of Hazel Grove, forcing the Union right wing to fold back upon its center and allowing Lee to reunite his divided forces.

Gettysburg nearly destroyed both the 14th Tennessee and Archer's brigade. On the first day of battle, along Willoughby Run, the famous Union Iron Brigade turned Archer's unsupported flank. His command retreated in wild confusion. The 14th, commanded by Lt. Col. James W. Lockert, had just devastated the 2nd Wisconsin with volley fire at close range when it discovered itself alone and exposed on the right and rear. Using the protection of Herbst Woods, the 14th retired in good order. After a day's rest, Lee assigned the remnants of the brigade to Brig. Gen. Johnston Pettigrew to join Pickett's Virginia division in an attack upon the Union center. What remained of Archer's Brigade now formed the hinge joining Pettigrew's and Pickett's men. Together, they formed a battle array of more than 10,000 troops, stretching almost a mile wide. The men from Tennessee aligned on Pickett's left and went in at The Angle alongside the shattered Virginians. Long before any one reached the wall Union fire slaughtered men in droves. An eyewitness, reporting on Archer's men, wrote:

"Every flag in the brigade excepting one was captured at or within the works of the enemy. The 1st Tennessee had 3 color-bearers shot down, the last of whom was at the works, and the flag captured. The 13th Alabama lost 3 in the same way, the last of whom was shot down at the works. The 14th Tennessee had 4 shot down, the last of whom was at the enemy's works. The 7th Tennessee lost 3 color-bearers, the last of whom was at the enemy's works, and the flag was only saved by Captain Norris tearing it away from the staff and bringing it out beneath his coat. The 5th Alabama Battalion also lost their flag at the enemy s works."

The 14th Tennessee Infantry was among the first units at the Union line and had many of its men captured. Losing over 58 percent of the men who entered the battle; barely 100 men reformed the regiment on the following day.

Despite its losses, the 14th Tennessee and the rest of the brigade continued to serve in Heth's division of the III Corps. The regiment added additional honors to their record for service at Williamsport, Bristoe Station, Mine Run, the Wilderness, Spotsylvania, Cold Harbor, Petersburg, Globe Tavern, Weldon Railroad, Reame's Station, Burgess' Tavern and Hatcher's Run. It surrendered with the rest of the army at Appomattox on April 9, 1865. Of a total of almost 1,000 officers and men who served in the 14th Tennessee, only 40 remained for the surrender.

== See also ==
- List of Tennessee Confederate Civil War units
