= Samuel McGowan (general) =

American judge (1819-1897)

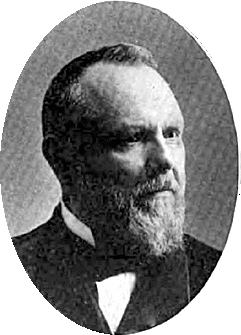
- South Carolina Supreme Court Associate Justice Samuel McGowan

Associate Justice of the South Carolina Supreme Court
- In office 1879–1894

Member of the South Carolina House of Representatives
- In office 1850–1861
- In office 1878–1879

Personal details
- Born: October 19, 1819 Laurens County, South Carolina, U.S.
- Died: August 9, 1897 (aged 77) Abbeville, South Carolina
- Spouse: Susan Caroline Wardlaw
- Children: 7
- Education: South Carolina College

Military service
- Allegiance: United States; Confederate States
- Branch/service: United States Army; Confederate Army
- Years of service: 1846–1847 (U.S.); 1861–1865 (C.S.)
- Rank: Captain (USV); Major general (S.C. militia); Brigadier general (C.S.)
- Unit: Palmetto Regiment (U.S.)
- Commands: 14th South Carolina Infantry (C.S.); McGowan's Brigade
- Battles/wars: Mexican–American War: Battle of Chapultepec; American Civil War: Battle of Fort Sumter; First Battle of Bull Run; Seven Days Battles; Second Battle of Bull Run; Battle of Chancellorsville; Battle of Spotsylvania Court House

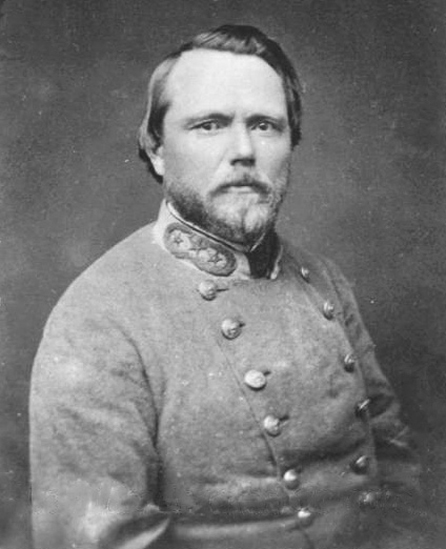
Samuel McGowan in military uniform

Samuel McGowan (October 19, 1819 – August 9, 1897) was an American military officer, lawyer, politician, judge, and a Brigadier general in the Confederate army during the American Civil War. Born in South Carolina, he commanded a brigade in A.P. Hill's famous "Light Division" and was wounded several times. Ezra Warner's book, Generals in Gray, claims that "McGowan's career and reputation were not excelled by any other brigade commander in the Army of Northern Virginia." Following reconstruction, he was elected to the United States Congress but refused to take his seat, later serving as an Associate Justice of the South Carolina Supreme Court.

== Early life and education ==
Born to Irish parents in the Laurens District of South Carolina, McGowan's father was a prosperous farmer who had intended his son to study law. McGowan attended and graduated from South Carolina College in 1841, where he was a member of the Clariosophic Society. Subsequently, he studied law in Abbeville and was admitted to the bar. Prior to the Civil War, McGowan practiced law as partner of Thomas C. Perrin and served in state politics. He volunteered for service in the Mexican–American War and enlisted as a private in the Palmetto Regiment. He was commended for his gallantry near Mexico City, rose to the rank of captain and served as quartermaster and staff officer.

== Career ==
=== American Civil War ===
In late 1860 he was appointed to command a brigade of the South Carolinian militia, being a major general in the same, and was present at the attack on Fort Sumter. At the First Battle of Bull Run, McGowan served as an aide-de-camp on the staff of General Milledge Bonham. In September 1861 he was appointed lieutenant colonel of the 14th South Carolina Infantry; and became the Colonel of the regiment in April 1862. The 14th was assigned to Maxcy Gregg's brigade in A.P. Hill's Light Division. After Gregg was killed in the Battle of Fredericksburg, McGowan was promoted to brigadier general (to rank from January 17, 1863) and took command of the Light Division's South Carolina brigade. One of his fellow officers was Abner M. Perrin, the nephew of his former law partner, who would succeed him in command of the regiment. Except for when wounded, McGowan commanded this brigade for the rest of the war, surrendering with it at Appomattox Court House.

McGowan was wounded four times during the Civil War. The first occurrence was at Cold Harbor during the Seven Days Battles on June 27, 1862, where he was bruised in the right side by canister. The second wound happened at Second Manassas when McGowan was hit in the thigh. McGowan suffered his worst wound at Chancellorsville. A Minié ball severely injured McGowan's leg below the knee. Although he kept the leg, it was not until February 1864 that he was able to return to field command. McGowan received his final wound at Spotsylvania where he was hit and suffered a minor wound to the forearm.

=== Reconstruction ===
Returning to Abbeville after the war ended, McGowan was elected to Congress as a member of the Conservative Party, but refused his seat. He became a leader in the fight against "carpetbagger" influences in the state's legislature. He was elected as an associate justice of the South Carolina Supreme Court in 1879 and served there until July 1894.

== Death ==
McGowan died in Abbeville August 9, 1897 and was buried there in Upper Long Cane Cemetery.

== See also ==
- List of American Civil War Generals (Confederate)
