= James Henry Lane (Confederate general) =

University professor and Confederate general in the American Civil War

James H. Lane
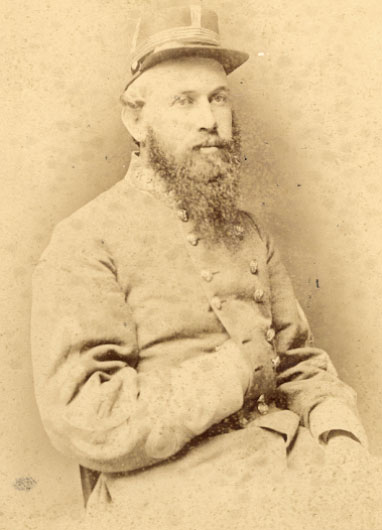
- James Henry Lane in Confederate general uniform; photo taken in 1865
- Born: July 28, 1833; Mathews Courthouse, Virginia
- Died: September 21, 1907 (aged 74); Auburn, Alabama
- Burial place: Pine Hill Cemetery; Auburn, Alabama
- Military career
- Allegiance: Confederate States of America
- Branch: Confederate States Army
- Service years: 1861 – 1865
- Rank: Brigadier General
- Nicknames: The Little General "Little Jim"
- Unit: 1st North Carolina Volunteers
- Commands: 28th North Carolina Infantry; Lane's Brigade
- Conflicts: American Civil War: Battle of Big Bethel; Seven Days Battles; Battle of Second Bull Run; Battle of Antietam; Battle of Gettysburg; Overland Campaign; Battle of Cold Harbor; Siege of Petersburg; Battle of Appomattox Court House
- Other work: Professor at Virginia Military Institute; North Carolina Military Institute; Virginia Agricultural and Mechanical College; Alabama Polytechnic Institute

James Henry Lane (July 28, 1833 – September 21, 1907) was a university professor and Confederate general in the American Civil War.

As its first Commandant, he is considered to be the father of the Virginia Tech Corps of Cadets and is the namesake of the University's oldest building, Lane Hall.

== Early life ==
Lane was born in Mathews Court House, Virginia. He graduated from the Virginia Military Institute (VMI) in 1854 and received a master's degree from the University of Virginia in 1857. He was a professor of mathematics at VMI and then of natural philosophy at the North Carolina Military Institute until the start of the Civil War.

== Civil War ==
Lane joined the Confederate Army and was commissioned as a major in the 1st North Carolina Volunteers on May 11, 1861. He participated in the Battle of Big Bethel and was made lieutenant colonel. Further promotion came quickly and he was a colonel and commander of the 28th North Carolina Infantry Regiment by September 15. In the Seven Days Battles of 1862 he was twice wounded leading his regiment. He served in Major General A.P. Hill's division of Thomas J. "Stonewall" Jackson's Second Corps for Second Bull Run and took over brigade command following the death of Brigadier General Lawrence O. Branch at the Battle of Antietam. He was promoted to brigadier general on November 1, 1862. It was soldiers with Major John D. Barry of Lane's brigade that accidentally shot General Jackson as he returned from a nighttime scouting trip in front of the Confederate lines during the Battle of Chancellorsville. Lane's command became the 2nd Brigade in W. Dorsey Pender's division of Hill's Third Corps of the Army of Northern Virginia the following May, directly before the beginning of the Gettysburg campaign.

At the Battle of Gettysburg, Lane's brigade fought on the first day (July 1, 1863) and Lane briefly assumed command of Pender's division following that officer's mortal wounding on the second day. He was replaced in division command by Major General Isaac R. Trimble and returned to lead his brigade during Pickett's Charge, during which he was wounded when his horse was shot from under him. Over the three-day battle, his brigade suffered almost 50% casualties. When Trimble was wounded in the attack, Lane resumed temporary command of the division.

In 1864, Lane continued in brigade command, through the Overland Campaign and Siege of Petersburg. In June, at the Battle of Cold Harbor, he was wounded in the groin. In February and March 1865, he commanded Cadmus M. Wilcox's division. He continued to serve during the Appomattox Campaign, where he was paroled from Appomattox Court House after Robert E. Lee's surrender on April 9.

== Postbellum career ==
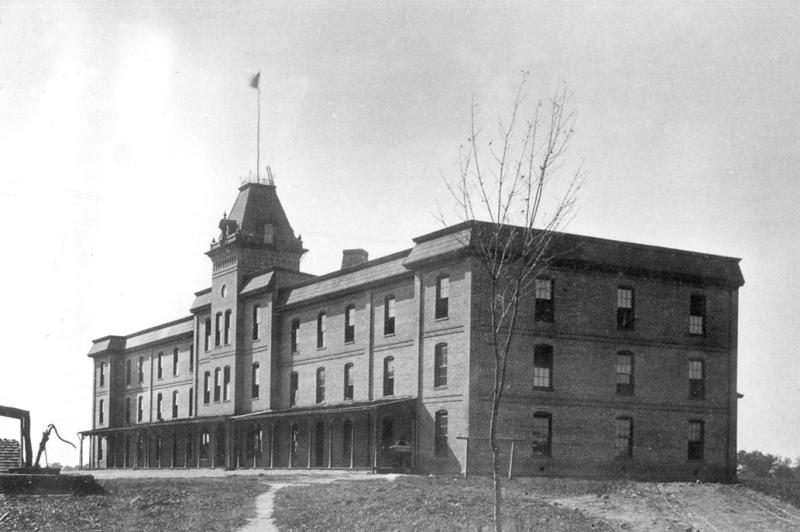
Lane Hall c. 1888-89

Lane returned to academic life, as professor of civil engineering and commerce at Virginia Agricultural and Mechanical College (VAMC)—founded in 1872, name changed to Virginia Polytechnic Institute (VPI) in 1896—and from 1881 until his death, professor of civil engineering and commandant at Alabama Polytechnic Institute, now known as Auburn University.

Lane served as the first commandant of the Corps of Cadets at VAMC. Before resigning, he had an argument with President Charles Minor, who wanted the college to eliminate strict military restrictions.

Lane died in Auburn, Alabama, and is interred there in Pine Hill Cemetery.

== Honors ==
Lane Hall, originally known as Barracks No. 1, on the Virginia Tech campus is named for General Lane. The barracks housed 130 cadets until it was converted into academic offices in 1967. Built in 1888, Lane Hall is listed on the Virginia Landmarks Register and National Register of Historic Places.

A klavern based in Auburn, Alabama, that was in existence by 1923 was named after General Lane.
