= A. P. Hill's Light Division =

A.P. Hill's Light Division
- Active: 1862–65
- Allegiance: Confederate States of America
- Branch: Infantry
- Type: Division
- Size: 4-6 brigades
- Part of: First Corps, Army of Northern Virginia; Second Corps, Army of Northern Virginia; Third Corps, Army of Northern Virginia
- Engagements: Seven Days Battles; Battle of Cedar Mountain; Second Manassas; Battle of Sharpsburg; Battle of Chancellorsville; Battle of Gettysburg; Battle of Cold Harbor

Commanders
- Notable commanders: Maj. Gen. A.P. Hill; Maj. Gen. Henry Heth (took over part of it after Stonewall Jackson's death); William Dorsey Pender (took over other half after Jackson's death); Cadmus Wilcox (took over after Pender's death during the retreat from Gettysburg)

A. P. Hill's Light Division was an infantry division in General Robert E. Lee's Confederate Army of Northern Virginia during the American Civil War. Originally including six brigades, the division's first commander starting May 27, 1862 was then Major General A. P. Hill. After the reorganization of the Army of Northern Virginia after Chancellorsville, Hill got command of the newly created Third Corps. The Light Division was broken up, and four brigades went to the newly created Division of Major General Henry Heth, while the remaining two brigades went to the Division of Major General William Dorsey Pender, later commanded by Major General and Cadmus M. Wilcox from August 3, 1863 since Pender had been mortally wounded at the Battle of Gettysburg. Both Heth and Wilcox commanded the two divisions containing the former Light Division brigades until the final surrender at Appomattox Courthouse on April 9, 1865.

== Component brigades and commanders ==
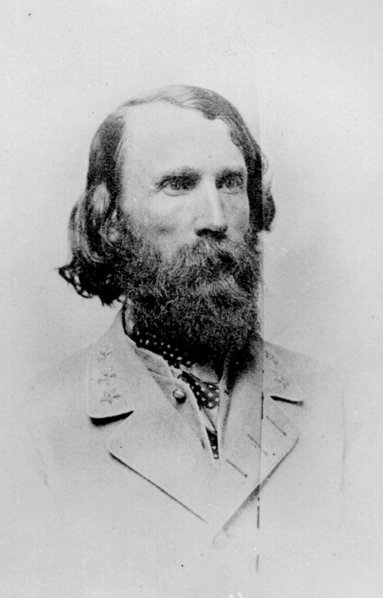
Image of Lieutenant General A.P. Hill

Created in the late May and June 1862, the Light Division included six brigades from six Confederate states. The First Brigade was a Virginia brigade under the command of Brigadier General Charles W. Field. The brigade initially included the 40th, 47th and 55th Virginia Infantry Regiments and the 2nd Virginia Infantry Battalion. This brigade was later commanded by Colonel John M. Brockenbrough after Field was severely wounded at the Second Battle of Bull Run (Second Manassas) and by Brigadier General Henry Heth from March 5, 1863, until May 3, 1863, when he temporarily assumed command of the division after Hill was wounded at the Battle of Chancellorsville. The Second Brigade was a South Carolina brigade commanded by Brigadier General Maxcy Gregg. This famous brigade became known as the Gregg-McGowan Brigade. Brigadier General Samuel McGowan was the other major commander of the brigade after Gregg was mortally wounded at the Battle of Fredericksburg and died two days later. The South Carolina Brigade included the 1st South Carolina Rifles (Orr's Rifles), and the 1st South Carolina Infantry, 12th South Carolina Infantry, 13th South Carolina Infantry and 14th South Carolina Infantry Regiments.

The Third Brigade included Georgia troops. First commanded by Brigadier General Joseph R. Anderson, the brigade was commanded for most of its existence by Brigadier General Edward L. Thomas. The brigade included the 14th Georgia Infantry, 35th Georgia Infantry, 39th Georgia Infantry and 45th Georgia Infantry Regiments.

The Fourth and Sixth Brigades included North Carolina infantry regiments. Brigadier General Lawrence O'Bryan Branch's brigade included the 7th North Carolina Infantry Regiment, 18th North Carolina Infantry Regiment, 28th North Carolina Infantry Regiment, 33rd North Carolina Infantry Regiment, and 37th North Carolina Infantry Regiment. After Branch was killed at the Battle of Antietam on September 17, 1862, the brigade was commanded by Brigadier General James H. Lane. Brigadier General William Dorsey Pender's Brigade included the 16th North Carolina Infantry Regiment, 22nd North Carolina Infantry Regiment, 34th North Carolina Infantry Regiment and 38th North Carolina Infantry Regiment. This brigade was later commanded by Colonel (from December 13, 1862), later Brigadier General (from June 13, 1862) Alfred Scales.

Finally, the Fifth Brigade was a mixed command of Alabama, Georgia and Tennessee regiments under Brigadier General James J. Archer. It mainly included the 5th Alabama Infantry Battalion, 19th Georgia Infantry Regiment, 1st Tennessee Infantry Regiment, 7th Tennessee Infantry Regiment, and 14th Tennessee Infantry Regiment. It was commanded from January 20, 1865, to the surrender of the Army of Northern Virginia at Appomattox Courthouse, Virginia, on April 9, 1865, by Brigadier General William McComb.

Artillery batteries initially attached to the Light Division included Captain R. Snowden Andrews's (Maryland) battery, Captain William K. Bachman's (Charleston, South Carolina) German battery, Captain Carter M. Braxton's Battery (Va.) [Fredericksburg Artillery], Captain William G. Crenshaw's (Virginia) battery, Captain Greenlee Davidson's Battery (Va.) [Letcher Artillery], Captain Marmaduke Johnson's (Virginia) battery, Captain L. Masters's (Virginia) battery, Captain David G. McIntosh's Battery (S.C.) [Pee Dee Artillery] and Captain William J. Pegram's Battery (Va.) [Purcell Artillery] and later Henry Grey Latham's Battery (N.C.) and Fleet's Battery (Va.) [Middlesex Artillery]. Major (Lieutenant Colonel by August 1862 at the Battle of Cedar Mountain) Reuben Lindsay Walker commanded the artillery batteries after Lieutenant Colonel Lewis M. Coleman commanded the division artillery during the Seven Days Battles.

== Fighting record ==
The Light Division saw its first action as a unit in the Seven Days Battles as part of James Longstreet's wing of the Army. Some of the regiments had seen action earlier in the campaign on May 27, 1862. The division was heavily engaged at the Battles of Mechanicsville, Gaines' Mill, and Glendale.

After A.P. Hill feuded with Longstreet in a newspaper, the Light Division was transferred to Stonewall Jackson's wing of the Army. With Jackson, the division again was heavily engaged at the Battle of Cedar Mountain. The division then took a conspicuous role on the defense of the Confederate line against repeated Union assaults at the Second Battle of Bull Run.

The Light Division had a prominent role in Lee's Maryland Campaign. Left behind to parole captured Union troops at Harpers Ferry, Hill and his men were not on the battlefield at the start of the Battle of Antietam. Leaving Harpers Ferry early on the morning of September 17, 1862, Hill's men completed the 17 miles (27 km) march in time to arrive and save Lee's Army, which was at that moment facing destruction from the advancing Union Army of the Potomac. In the battle, Brigadier General Branch was killed.

The division took part in the Battle of Fredericksburg on December 13, 1862, but the division's alignment was not well-positioned, with a dangerous gap in the middle of the line. Gregg's brigade was posted behind the gap and in dense woods where they had little ability to see the battlefield. Brigadier General Maxcy Gregg was mortally wounded in the subsequent fighting. Colonel Daniel H. Hamilton took temporary command of the brigade.

The division last served together as a unit of six brigades at the Battle of Chancellorsville where soldiers of the 18th North Carolina Infantry of Lane's Brigade had the misfortune of mortally wounding Stonewall Jackson. In the same rash of firing, A.P. Hill also was wounded, though his wound proved to be minor.

=== Reorganization ===
After Stonewall Jackson's death, Lee reorganized his Army. A.P. Hill was promoted to lieutenant general and given command of the Third Corps. The composition of the Light Division was changed. Two of the brigades —- the Virginia Brigade and Archer's Brigade -— were placed in a new division under Major General Henry Heth. The remaining brigades stayed together under Major General Dorsey Pender. Heth was actually the division's senior brigade commander, but Hill preferred Pender to have command of his old division, writing "Gen. Pender has fought with the Division in every battle, has been four times wounded and never left the field, has risen by death and wounds from fifth brigadier to be its senior, has the best drilled and disciplined Brigade in the Division, and more than all, possesses the unbounded confidence of the Division."

Parts of the division were engaged on July 1 and July 3, 1863, at the Battle of Gettysburg. Here, Major General Pender was mortally wounded on July 2 as he moved to engage his men. The division fought under Major General Isaac R. Trimble in Pickett's Charge on July 3, 1863. After Pender's death, the division continued under the command of Major General Cadmus Wilcox and fought in the Battle of the Wilderness, Battle of Spotsylvania Court House, Battle of Cold Harbor and Siege of Petersburg.

== Name ==
The first official reference to the "Light Division" was in a routine communique from Hill's headquarters on June 1, 1862, soon after he took command of the division. The division's name may have been a reference to the famous British Light Division. It may have been meant as ironic given that the division was the largest in the Army of Northern Virginia when it was formed. It may also be the case that Hill simply named the division the "Light Division" to instill a sense of speed, esprit de corps, and because he envisioned great things for it. The reasons for this name are ultimately unclear.
