= William McComb =

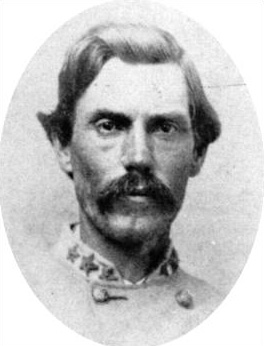
- Born: November 21, 1828; Mercer County, Pennsylvania
- Died: July 12, 1918 (aged 89); Louisa County, Virginia
- Burial place: Mechanicsville Cemetery, Boswells, Virginia
- Spouse: Nannie H. Quarles McComb
- Military career
- Allegiance: United States of America; Confederate States of America
- Branch: Confederate States Army
- Service years: 1861–65
- Rank: Brigadier General
- Commands: 14th Tennessee Infantry Regiment; McComb's Brigade
- Conflicts: American Civil War: Battle of Gaines' Mill; Battle of Antietam; Battle of Chancellorsville; Overland Campaign; Siege of Petersburg

William McComb (November 21, 1828 – July 12, 1918) was a Confederate brigadier general. He was born in Pennsylvania, but moved to Tennessee. McComb fought in many important battles of the Civil War's Eastern Theater.

== Early life ==
McComb was born in Mercer County, Pennsylvania. He took up residence in Clarksville, Tennessee, in 1854. He erected a flour mill in Cumberland County and was involved in various manufacturing interests.

== Civil War ==
When the Civil War broke out, McComb chose the Confederacy despite his Northern birth and enlisted as a private in the 14th Tennessee Infantry Regiment. Soon after his enlistment, McComb was elected second lieutenant, then major of his regiment. The 14th Tennessee was part of Brig. Gen. James Archer's brigade in A.P. Hill's "Light Division" of the Army of Northern Virginia. McComb became Colonel of his regiment in September 1862.

McComb was wounded in several battles, including Gaines' Mill, Antietam, and Chancellorsville. In August 1863, he took command of Brig. Gen. Cadmus M. Wilcox's old Alabama brigade. He commanded this unit through the Overland Campaign and on through the Siege of Petersburg. He was finally promoted to brigadier general on January 20, 1865. He was paroled at Appomattox Court House.

== Postbellum career ==
After the war, McComb lived in Alabama and Mississippi, eventually settling in Gordonsville, Louisa County, Virginia, where he was a farmer for nearly fifty years. McComb died on his plantation. He was buried in Mechanicsville Cemetery in Boswells, Virginia.

== See also ==
- List of American Civil War generals (Confederate)
