= General Gregg =

General Gregg may refer to:

- David McMurtrie Gregg (1833–1916), Union Army brigadier general and brevet major general
- John Gregg (Texas politician) (1828–1864), Confederate States Army brigadier general
- Maxcy Gregg (1814–1862), Confederate States Army brigadier general
