= Battle of Jerusalem Plank Road =

1864 battle of the American Civil War in Petersburg, Virginia

Coordinates: 37.1844°N 77.3767°W

- Part of the American Civil War
Date	June 21, 1864 – June 23, 1864
Location	Petersburg, Virginia
Result	Inconclusive See § Aftermath

Belligerents
United States (Union)	(Confederate States of America) CSA (Confederacy)

Commanders and leaders
David B. Birney; Horatio G. Wright	A. P. Hill; William Mahone

Units involved
II Corps; VI Corps	Third Corps

Strength
27,000	8,000

Casualties and losses
2,962	572

The Battle of Jerusalem Plank Road, also known as the First Battle of the Weldon Railroad, took place during the American Civil War fought June 21–23, 1864, near Petersburg, Virginia. It was the first of a series of battles during the Siege of Petersburg aimed at extending the Union siege lines to the west and cutting the rail lines supplying Petersburg. Two infantry corps of the Union Army of the Potomac attempted to sever the Weldon Railroad, but were attacked and driven off by the Confederate Army of Northern Virginia's Third Corps, principally the division of Brig. Gen. William Mahone. The battle victory left the Weldon Railroad temporarily in Confederate hands, but the Union Army began to extend its fortifications to the west, starting to increase the pressure of the siege.

== Background ==
After the assaults on Petersburg the previous week failed to capture the city, Lt. Gen. Ulysses S. Grant reluctantly decided on a siege of Petersburg, defended by Gen. Robert E. Lee's Army of Northern Virginia. The Union Army of the Potomac, commanded by Maj. Gen. George G. Meade (although closely supervised by his superior, Grant), entrenched east of the city, running from near the Jerusalem Plank Road (present-day U.S. Route 301, Crater Road) to the Appomattox River.

Grant's first objective was to secure the three remaining open rail lines that served Petersburg and the Confederate capital of Richmond: the Richmond and Petersburg Railroad; the South Side Railroad, which reached to Lynchburg in the west; and the Petersburg Railroad, also called the Petersburg and Weldon Railroad, which led to Weldon, North Carolina, and connected to the Wilmington and Weldon Railroad which led to the Confederacy's only remaining major port, Wilmington, North Carolina. Grant decided on a wide-ranging cavalry raid (the Wilson-Kautz Raid) against the South Side and Weldon railroads, but he also directed that a significant infantry force be sent against the Weldon closer to his current position. Meade selected the II Corps, temporarily commanded by Maj. Gen. David B. Birney while Maj. Gen. Winfield S. Hancock was suffering from his lingering wound incurred at Gettysburg, and the VI Corps, commanded by Maj. Gen. Horatio G. Wright. The positions in the trench lines occupied by these two corps were to be filled in by units of the Army of the James that would be moved from Bermuda Hundred.

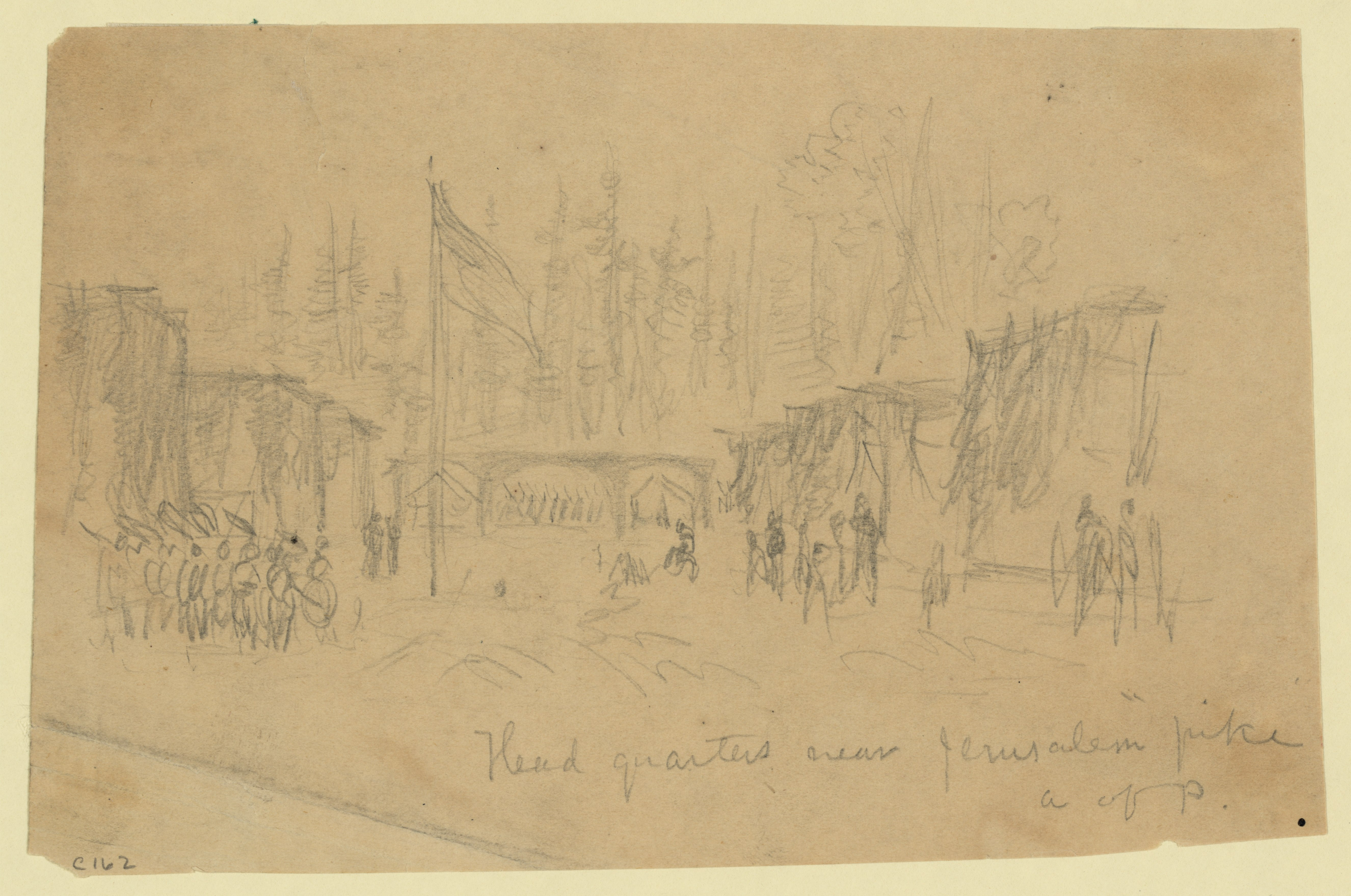
Union headquarters at Jerusalem plank road, sketched by Alfred Waud

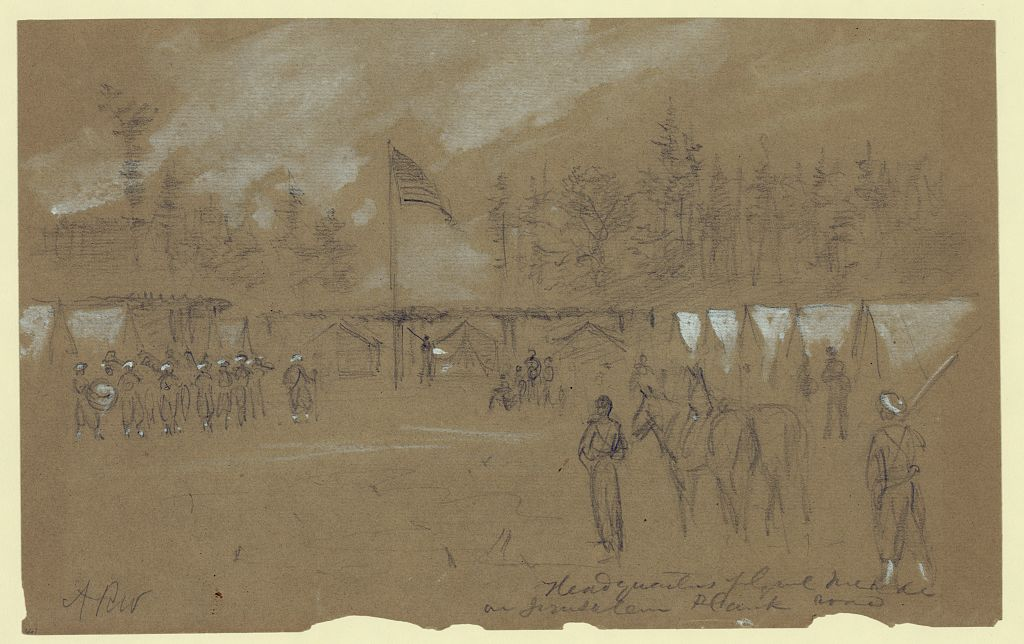
Headquarters of General Meade, by Alfred Waud

As the Union troops were rearranging their lines on June 21 in preparation for their mission against the railroad, they received a surprise visitor, President Abraham Lincoln, who had traveled by water and landed at City Point, Grant's newly established headquarters. He told Grant, "I just thought I would jump aboard a boat and come down and see you. I don't expect I can do any good, and in fact I'm afraid I may do some harm, but I'll just put myself under your orders and if you find me doing anything wrong just send me right away." After discussing strategy with Grant, Lincoln visited some of the VI Corps troops who would participate in the upcoming battle.

== Battle ==
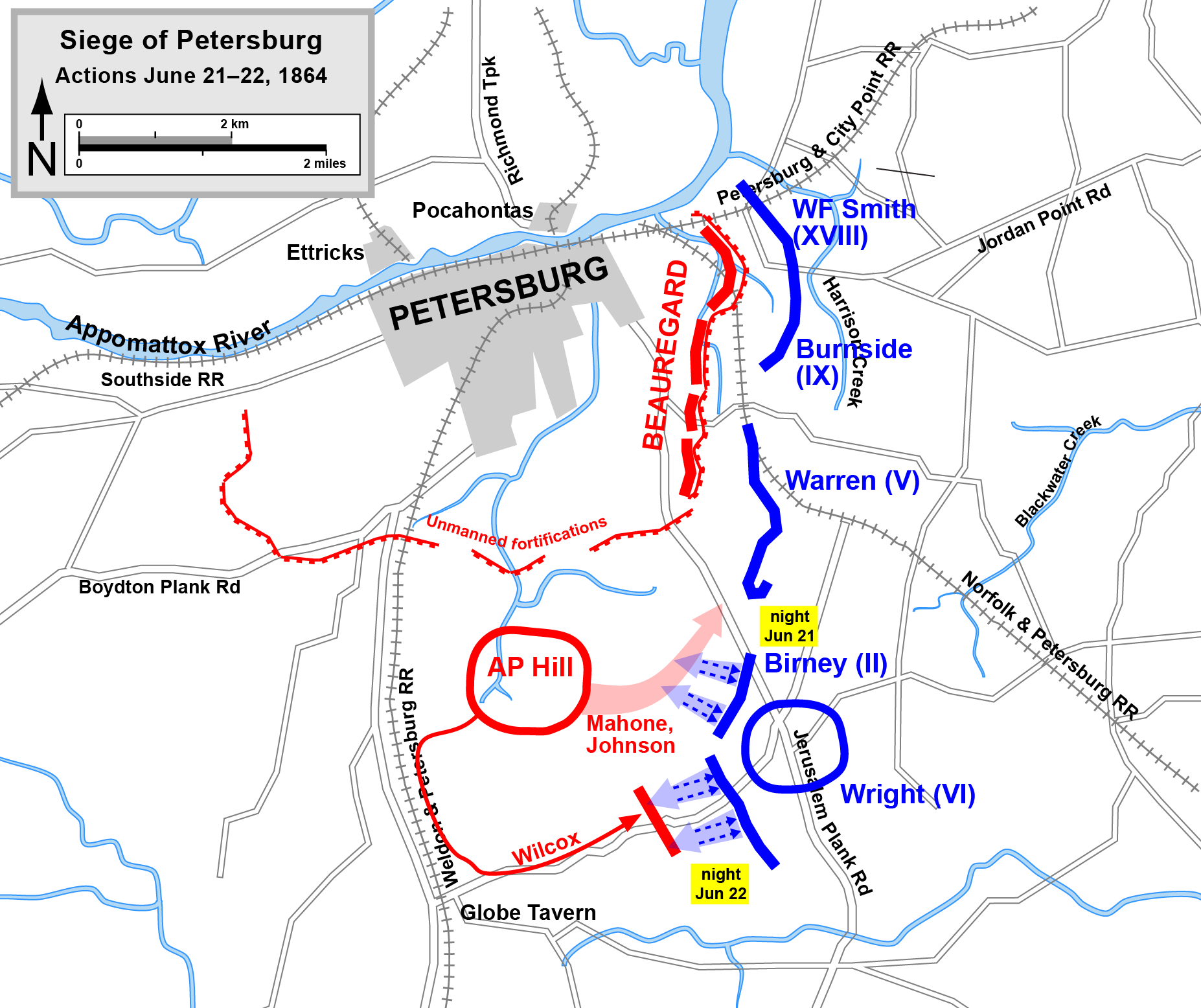
Siege of Petersburg, movements against the railroads and A. P. Hill's counterattack, June 21–22 Confederate Union

On June 21, elements of the II Corps probed toward the railroad and skirmished with Confederate cavalry. The plan of attack was that both the II and VI Corps would cross the Jerusalem Plank Road and then pivot northwest about 2 miles (3.2 km) to reach the railroad. Difficult terrain—swamps and thickets—slowed their advance and by the morning of June 22, a gap opened up between the two corps. While the II Corps began pivoting as planned, the VI Corps encountered Confederate troops from Maj. Gen. Cadmus Wilcox's division of Lt. Gen. A. P. Hill's corps and they began to entrench rather than advance. Brig. Gen. William Mahone, another division commander in Hill's corps, observed that the gap between the two Union corps was widening, creating a prime target.

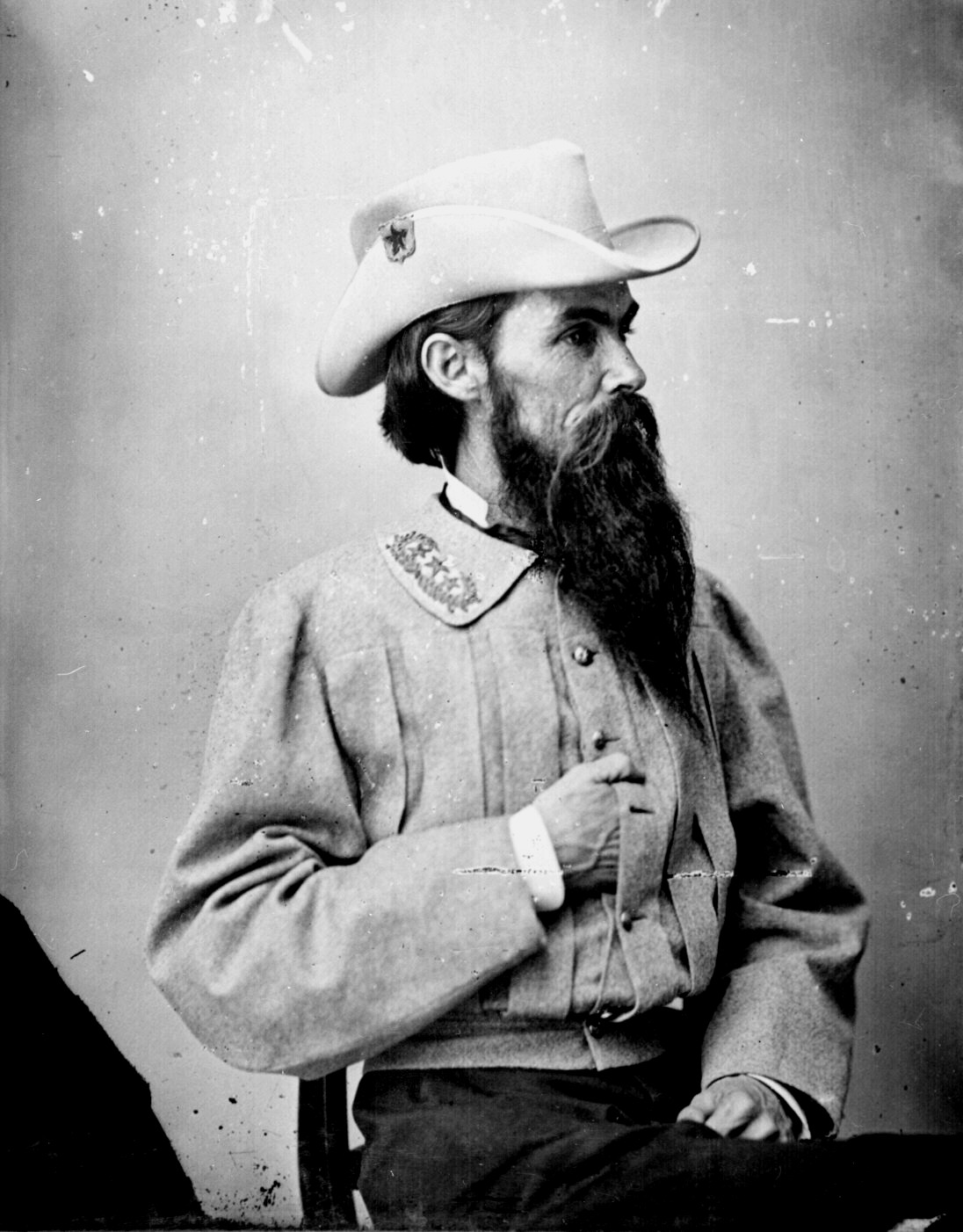
Brig. Gen. William Mahone

Mahone had been a railroad engineer before the war and had personally surveyed this area south of Petersburg, so he was familiar with a ravine that could be used to hide the approach of a Confederate attack column. Robert E. Lee approved Mahone's plan and at 3 p.m. on June 22, Mahone's men emerged in the rear of the II Corps division of Brig. Gen. Francis C. Barlow, catching them by surprise. A soldier wrote, "The attack was to the Union troops more than a surprise. It was an astonishment."

With a wild yell which rang out shrill and fierce through the gloomy pines, Mahone's men burst upon the flank—a pealing volley, which roared along the whole front—a stream of wasting fire, under which the adverse left fell as one man—and the bronzed veterans swept forward, shriveling up Barlow's division as lightning shrivels the dead leaves of autumn.

— Diary of W. Gordon McCabe, artilleryman in Mahone's division

Barlow's division quickly collapsed under the surprise assault. The division of Brig. Gen. John Gibbon, which had erected earthworks, was also surprised by an attack from the rear and many of the regiments ran for safety. Mahone sent an urgent message to Wilcox, asking him to join in the attack; but Wilcox was concerned about the VI Corps men to his front and the two regiments he sent in support arrived too late to make a difference. The II Corps troops rallied around earthworks that they had constructed on the night of June 21 and stabilized their lines. Darkness ended the fighting.

On June 23, the II Corps advanced to retake its lost ground, but the Confederates had pulled back, abandoning the earthworks they had captured. Under orders from General Meade, the VI Corps sent out a heavy skirmish line after 10 a.m. in a second attempt to reach the Weldon Railroad. Men from Brig. Gen. Lewis A. Grant's 1st Vermont Brigade had begun tearing up track when they were attacked by a larger force of Confederate infantry. Numerous Vermonters were taken prisoner and only about half a mile (0.8 km) of track had been destroyed when they were chased away. Meade repeatedly urged Horatio G. Wright to move forward and engage the enemy, but Wright refused to move, concerned that his corps would suffer the same reverses as the II Corps the previous day. At 7:35 p.m., Meade gave up and told Wright, "Your delay has been fatal." Meade's aide Theodore Lyman wrote, "On this particular occasion Wright showed himself totally unfit to command a corps."

== Aftermath ==
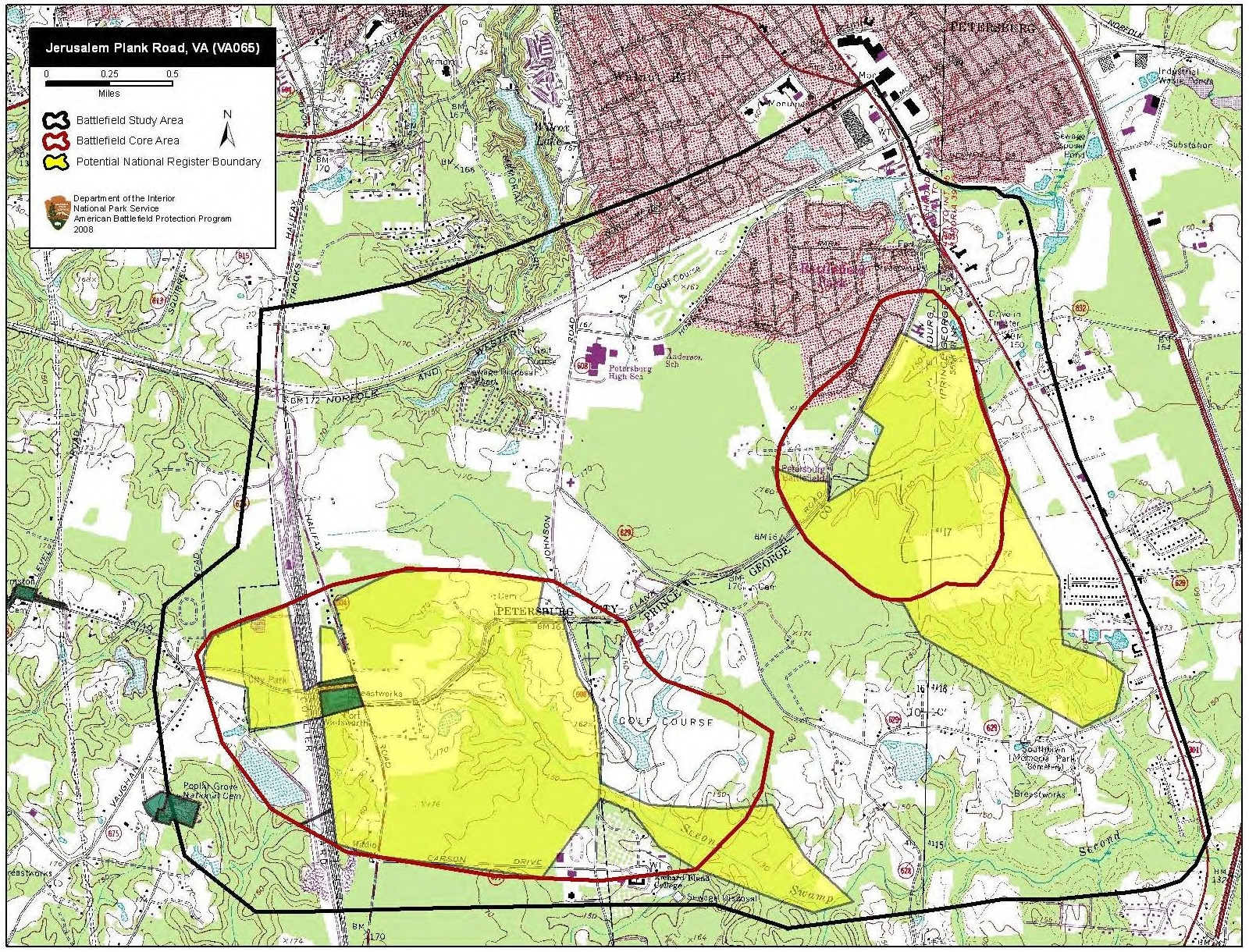
Map of Jerusalem Plank Road Battlefield core and study areas by the American Battlefield Protection Program

Union casualties were 2,962, Confederate 572. The battle's outcome was inconclusive, with advantages gained on both sides. Some historians point to the battle as a tactical Confederate victory noting the heavy Union casualties and the fact that the Confederates were able to retain control of the Petersburg Railroad. Others argue that it was the Federals who were tactically successful in that they were able to destroy a short segment of the railroad before being driven off and, more importantly, extend their siege lines further to the west, a strategy Grant would continue until the spring of 1865. Be that as it may, additional segments of the Petersburg Railroad were destroyed by the Wilson-Kautz Raid and more would fall to the Union Army during the Battle of Globe Tavern (or the Second Battle of the Weldon Railroad) in August, although Lee could ship supplies by wagon from the Weldon where it reached Stony Creek Station. In an expedition of December 7–11, Maj. Gen. Gouverneur K. Warren destroyed an additional 16 miles (26 km) of track, rendering the Weldon Railroad unable to supply Petersburg.
