= Cadmus M. Wilcox =

United States Army officer (1824–1890)

Cadmus Marcellus Wilcox
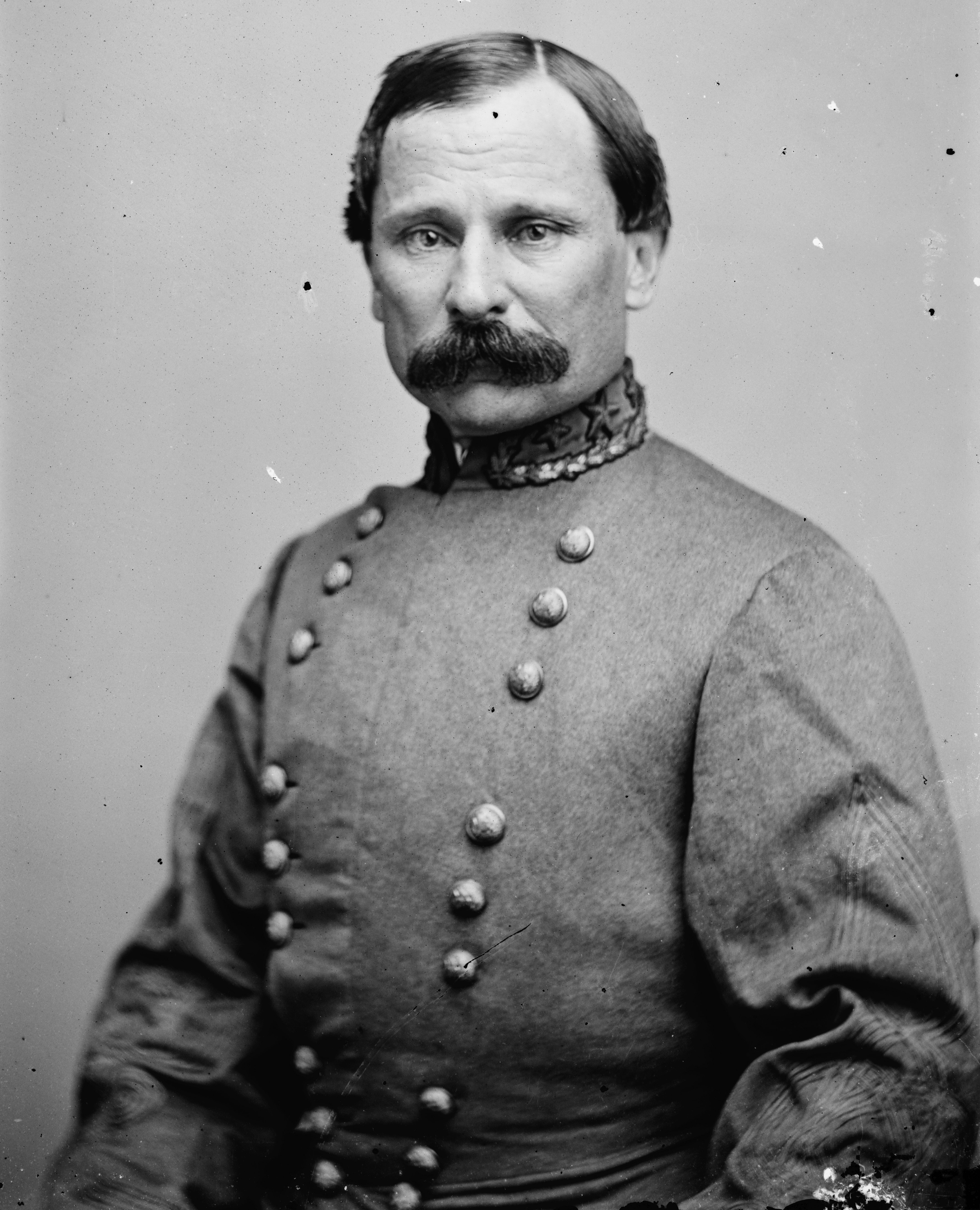
- Born: May 20, 1824; Wayne County, North Carolina, U.S.
- Died: December 2, 1890 (aged 66); Washington, D.C., U.S.
- Burial place: Oak Hill Cemetery; Washington, D.C., U.S.
- Relatives: John A. Wilcox (brother)
- Military career
- Allegiance: United States; Confederate States of America
- Branch: United States Army; Confederate States Army
- Service years: 1846–1861 (USA); 1861–1865 (CSA)
- Rank: Captain (USA); Major General (CSA)
- Nickname: Billy Fixin'
- Commands: 9th Alabama Infantry Regiment; Wilcox's Brigade; Wilcox's Division
- Conflicts: Mexican–American War; American Civil War
- Other work: author

Signature
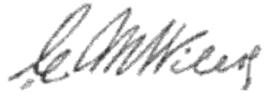

Cadmus Marcellus Wilcox (May 20, 1824 – December 2, 1890) was a United States Army officer who served in the Mexican–American War and was later a Confederate general during the American Civil War.

== Early life and career ==
Wilcox was born in Wayne County, North Carolina. One of his brothers, John A. Wilcox, would later serve in the First Confederate Congress as a representative from Texas. The family moved to Tipton County, Tennessee, when Cadmus was only two years old. He was raised and educated in Tennessee, studying at Cumberland University before being nominated to the United States Military Academy at West Point from the Memphis district. He graduated in 1846, standing 54th out of 59 cadets, and was brevetted a second lieutenant in the 4th U.S. Infantry on July 1. Among his West Point classmates were future Civil War generals George B. McClellan and Thomas J. Jackson.

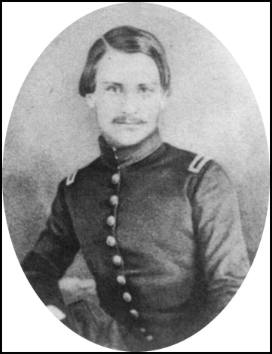
Wilcox as US Army second lieutenant

With the Mexican–American War already underway, Wilcox joined the 4th Infantry in the Mexican city of Monterrey in 1847. He was appointed as an aide to Maj. Gen. John A. Quitman, acting as his adjutant at the Battle of Veracruz and the Battle of Cerro Gordo. For gallant conduct at the Battle of Chapultepec, in action at the Belén Gate, and the Battle for Mexico City, Wilcox was appointed a brevet first lieutenant on September 13. On August 22, 1848 Wilcox served as a groomsman in the wedding of Ulysses S. Grant.

After the war with Mexico ended, Wilcox was promoted to first lieutenant on August 24, 1851. In the autumn of 1852, Wilcox was ordered back to West Point to serve as assistant instructor of military tactics, a position he held until the summer of 1857, when, on account of failing health, he was sent to Europe on a twelve-month furlough. On his return to West Point, he published a manual on rifles and rifle firing, which became the standard textbook on the subject. Wilcox also translated and published a work on infantry evolution as practiced in the Austrian Army.

He was ordered to New Mexico Territory in 1860, and was promoted to the rank of captain in the 4th Infantry on December 20.

== Civil War service ==
While serving in the New Mexico Territory in June 1861, Wilcox learned of the secession of Tennessee. After tendering his resignation from the U.S. Army (accepted on June 8) he traveled to Richmond, Virginia, where he was commissioned a captain of artillery in the Confederate Army on March 16. He was later promoted to colonel and given command of the 9th Alabama Infantry Regiment on July 9.

Wilcox joined Brig. Gen. Joseph E. Johnston's Army of the Shenandoah with his regiment on July 16, and marched to Manassas to reinforce Brig. Gen. P.G.T. Beauregard's Army of the Potomac just before the First Battle of Bull Run on July 21.

On October 21, he was promoted to brigadier general and placed in command of a brigade comprising the 3rd Alabama, 1st Mississippi, and 1st Virginia infantry regiments along with an artillery battery. The brigade was assigned to Maj. Gen. James Longstreet's division of the First Corps, Army of Northern Virginia. During the 1862 Peninsula Campaign, Wilcox played a prominent role at the Battle of Williamsburg on May 5.

At the 1862 Battle of Seven Pines, Wilcox commanded two brigades, and at Battle of Gaines' Mill on June 27 he led three—his own, Featherston's, and Pryor's. On June 30 at the Battle of Glendale during the Seven Days Battles, nearly every regimental officer in Wilcox's command was killed, and Wilcox himself had his clothing pierced by six bullets, but he somehow escaped injury. The loss in Wilcox's brigade was heavier in the Seven Days Battles than of any other brigade in Longstreet's division. After Longstreet was elevated to corps command, Wilcox got half of his division. He led it to Second Bull Run, but was held in reserve and saw no serious action. In the Maryland Campaign, Wilcox was returned to brigade command and his division merged with Richard H. Anderson's. He fell ill and spent the Battle of Antietam resting in Martinsburg, Virginia, leaving Colonel Alfred Cumming to command his brigade during that battle.

As a part of the division of Maj. Gen. Richard H. Anderson at the Battle of Chancellorsville in May 1863, Wilcox's brigade was instrumental in delaying the Union VI Corps in its drive west from Fredericksburg, Virginia, slowing them at the Battle of Salem Church. Shortly after the battle, Wilcox and his brigade moved with Anderson's division to the newly created Third Corps, under Lt. Gen. A.P. Hill on May 30.

=== Gettysburg ===
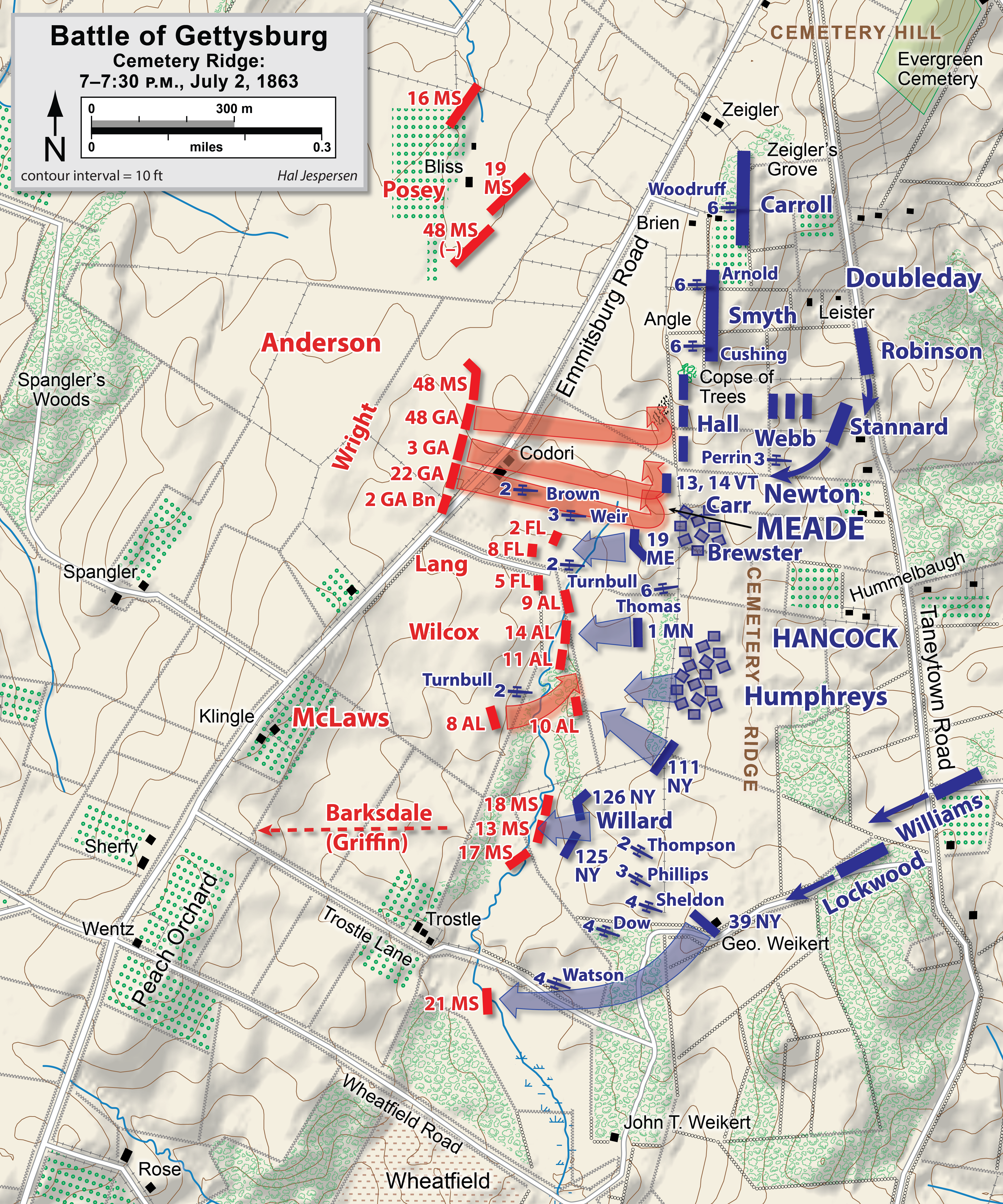
Attack by Anderson's division, July 2

Wilcox and his command participated in the Battle of Gettysburg in the summer of 1863. On the battle's second day, July 2, his charge against a weakened Union line was met (and held off) by a suicidally brave countercharge from the 1st Minnesota Volunteer Infantry.

On the third day of the battle, during Pickett's Charge, his brigade served as support on the right flank of the division of his West Point classmate, Maj. Gen. George Pickett. Heavy Union artillery fire, particularly from the guns on Cemetery Ridge under the command of Lt. Col. Freeman McGilvery, readily broke up Wilcox's assault, who ordered the brigade to withdraw.

With the death of Dorsey Pender at Gettysburg, Wilcox was promoted to major general on August 3, 1863, and assigned command of Pender's division in Hill's Third Corps. Wilcox's new command consisted of Lane's North Carolina brigade, Thomas's Georgia brigade, McGowan's South Carolina brigade, and Scales's North Carolina brigade.

For the rest of the war, Wilcox's Division saw heavy fighting, from the Overland Campaign through Appomattox Court House. During the final days of the Siege of Petersburg in 1865, Wilcox's last-ditch stand on April 2 at Fort Gregg helped delay the Union forces long enough for Longstreet to maneuver into position to cover the army's retreat to the west.

== Postbellum career ==
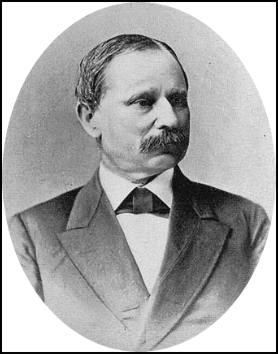
Wilcox in later life

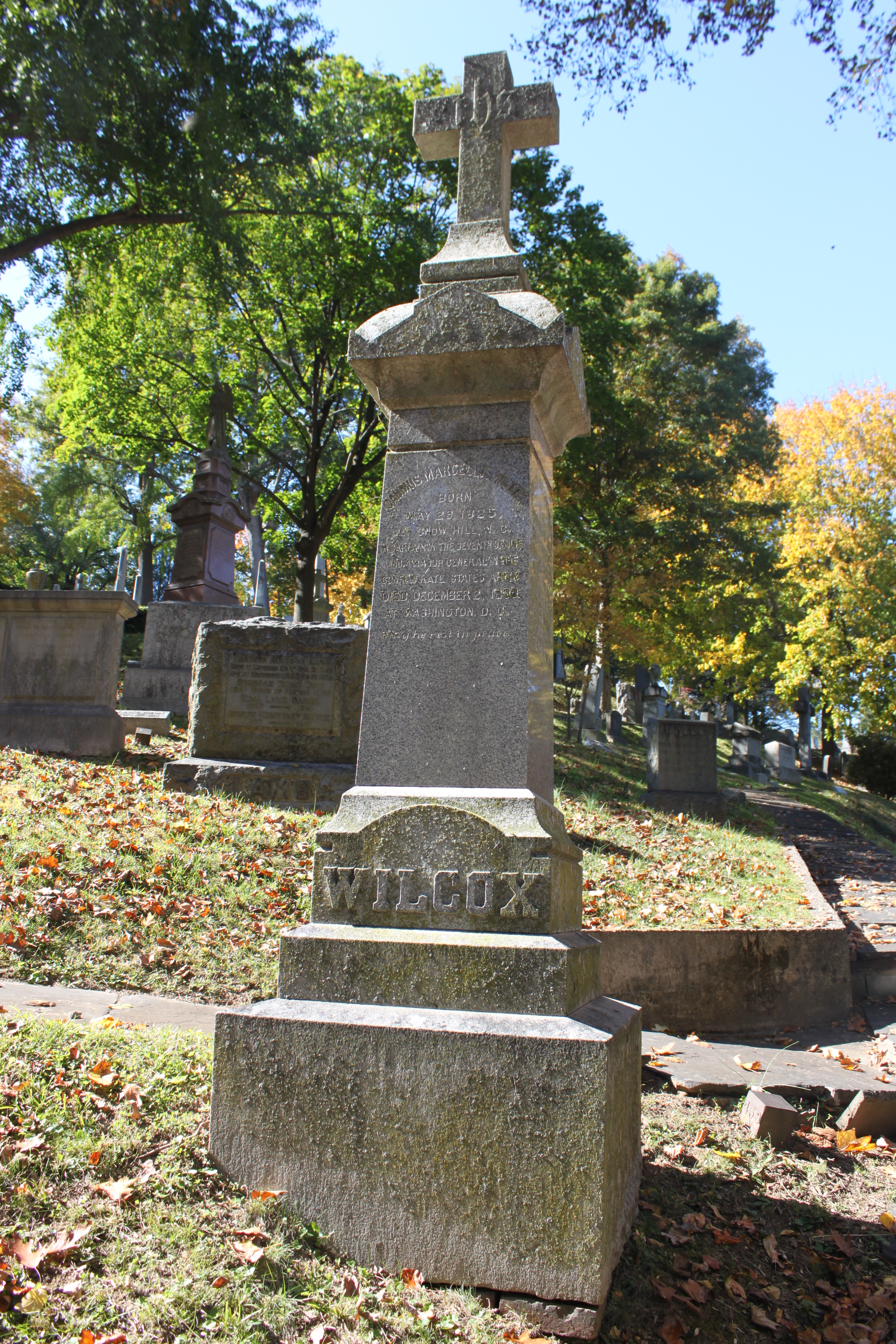
Grave of Wilcox at Oak Hill Cemetery

After the close of the American Civil War, Wilcox was offered a command as a brigadier general in the Egyptian Army, but he declined it. In 1886 U.S. President Grover Cleveland appointed Wilcox as chief of the railroad division for the government at Washington, D.C., and he served in that capacity until his death.

A lifelong bachelor, Wilcox cared for his brother's widow and small children following John Wilcox's sudden death in February 1865.

Wilcox died at the age of sixty-six in Washington, D.C., and was buried there in Oak Hill Cemetery. His pallbearers included four former Confederate generals and four former Union generals, a token of his esteem.

== See also ==
- List of American Civil War generals (Confederate)
