= Maxcy Gregg =

Confederate Army general

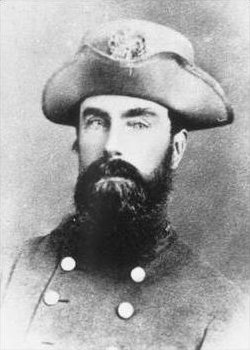
- Born: Maxcy Gregg; August 1, 1814; Columbia, South Carolina, U.S.
- Died: December 15, 1862 (aged 48) Fredericksburg, Virginia, C.S.
- Allegiance: United States of America; Confederate States of America
- Branch: United States Army; Confederate States Army
- Service years: 1846–1848 (USA); 1861–1862 (CSA)
- Rank: Major (USA); Brigadier General (CSA)
- Conflicts: Mexican–American War; American Civil War: Battle of Fort Sumter; Second Manassas; Seven Days Battles; Battle of Antietam (WIA); Battle of Fredericksburg (DOW)

Maxcy Gregg (August 1, 1814 – December 15, 1862) was an American lawyer, soldier in the United States Army during the Mexican–American War, and a Confederate brigadier general during the American Civil War who was mortally wounded at the Battle of Fredericksburg and died two days later.

== Early life ==
Gregg was born in Columbia, South Carolina, the great-grandson of Esek Hopkins, commodore of the Continental Navy, and grandson of Jonathan Maxcy first president of South Carolina College (now called the University of South Carolina), where Gregg would later attend and graduate first in his class. He was admitted to the South Carolina bar in 1839, practiced law with his father, and was a very respected member of Columbia society. His first military experience came as a major in the 12th U.S. Infantry in the Mexican–American War, but did not arrive in time to participate in any of the major battles. Gregg had many scholarly pursuits, including astronomy, botany, ornithology, and languages, and owned his own private observatory. Maxcy Gregg was a strong advocate of states rights his entire life, one of the South Carolina Fire-Eaters. He was a member of the 1860 convention which determined the secession of South Carolina. He was also a lifelong bachelor.

== Civil War ==
Gregg was a major proponent of secession prior to the commencement of the Civil War. In 1858, he issued the secessionists' manifesto in a pamphlet entitled, "An Appeal to the State Rights Party of South Carolina." In it, Gregg argued that Carolinians had looked unfavorably upon and rejected incorporation into the Democratic Party since the tariff controversy. Andrew P. Calhoun, James Tradewell, A.C. Garlington, and W.E. Martin also contributed statements to the "Appeal."

When South Carolina seceded from the Union in December 1860, Gregg helped organize the 1st South Carolina Volunteers, and served as the regiment's first colonel. He became a brigadier general and served in A. P. Hill's Light Division. His brigade played a prominent role in Hill's assault on the Union lines at the Battle of Gaines' Mill. Gregg gained prominence at the Second Battle of Bull Run when his men repulsed six Union assaults, and he served in Robert E. Lee's Maryland Campaign. At Antietam he was wounded in the thigh by the same bullet that killed Brig. Gen. Lawrence O'Bryan Branch.

== Death ==
At Fredericksburg, Union Maj. Gen. George Meade's troops penetrated the lines of the Light Division. Gregg's brigade was caught by surprise, and in the confusion he was shot in the back. Gregg was found by a group of staff officers and taken to a field hospital in the rear. An examination of the wound found that the bullet had penetrated his spine. Gregg was unable to feel anything in his lower body and assumed he was completely paralyzed from the waist down, but after being placed in bed he managed to regain some feeling in his legs. However, doctors pronounced the wound mortal, and Gregg died on December 15, saying on his deathbed "I yield my life cheerfully, fighting for the independence of South Carolina." Stonewall Jackson, who had previously quarreled with Gregg, came to see him on his deathbed.

== In popular media ==
He was portrayed by actor Buck Taylor in the 2003 film Gods and Generals.

== See also ==
- List of American Civil War generals (Confederate)
