= A. P. Hill =

Confederate Army general (1825–1865)

Lieutenant General A. P. Hill
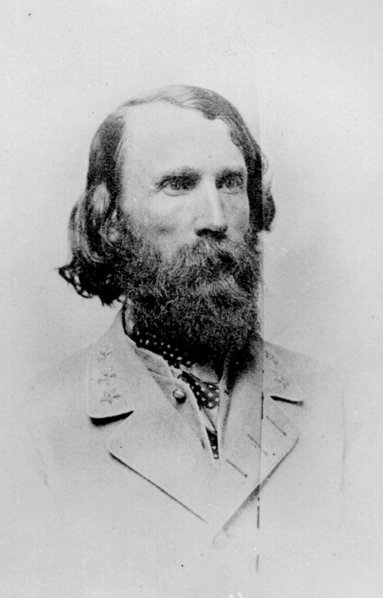
- Born: Ambrose Powell Hill Jr. November 9, 1825; Culpeper, Virginia, U.S.
- Died: April 2, 1865 (aged 39); Petersburg, Virginia, C.S.
- Burial place: Fairview Cemetery
- Education: U.S. Military Academy
- Spouse: Kitty Morgan McClung (m. 1859)
- Military career
- Allegiance: United States; Confederate States
- Branch: United States Army; Confederate States Army
- Service years: 1847–61 (U.S.); 1861–65 (C.S.)
- Rank: First Lieutenant (USA); Lieutenant General (CSA)
- Nickname: "Little Powell"
- Commands: 13th Virginia Infantry; A. P. Hill's Light Division; Second Corps; Third Corps, Army of Northern Virginia
- Conflicts: Mexican–American War; Seminole Wars; American Civil War; First Battle of Bull Run; Peninsula Campaign; Seven Days Battles; Battle of Cedar Mountain; Second Battle of Bull Run; Battle of Antietam; Battle of Fredericksburg; Battle of Chancellorsville (WIA); Battle of Gettysburg; Battle of Bristoe Station; Battle of Mine Run; Battle of the Wilderness; Battle of North Anna; Battle of Cold Harbor; Siege of Petersburg; Third Battle of Petersburg †

Ambrose Powell Hill Jr. (November 9, 1825 – April 2, 1865) was a Confederate general who was killed in the American Civil War. He is usually referred to as A. P. Hill to differentiate him from Confederate general Daniel Harvey Hill, who was unrelated.

A Virginian, Hill was a career United States Army officer who had fought in the Mexican–American War and Seminole Wars before joining the Confederate States Army. After the start of the American Civil War, he gained early fame as the commander of the "Light Division" in the Seven Days Battles. He became one of Stonewall Jackson's ablest subordinates, distinguishing himself in the 1862 battles of Cedar Mountain, Second Bull Run, Antietam, and Fredericksburg.

Following Jackson's death in May 1863 at the Battle of Chancellorsville, Hill was promoted to lieutenant general and commanded the Third Corps of Robert E. Lee's Army of Northern Virginia, which he led in the summer Gettysburg campaign and the fall campaigns of 1863. His command of the corps in 1864–65 was interrupted on multiple occasions by illness, from which he did not return until just before the end of the war. He was killed during the Union army's offensive at the Third Battle of Petersburg.

== Early life and education ==
Hill, known to his family as Powell (and to his soldiers as Little Powell), was born in Culpeper, Virginia, the seventh and final child of Thomas and Fannie Russell Baptist Hill. Powell was named for his uncle, Ambrose Powell Hill (1785–1858), who served in both houses of the Virginia legislature, and Capt. Ambrose Powell, an Indian fighter, explorer, sheriff, legislator, and close friend of President James Madison. The younger Powell Hill lived with his family in a home on North Main Street in Culpeper as a child from age four or age seven.

Hill was nominated to enter the United States Military Academy in 1842 in a class that started with 85 cadets. He made friends easily, including such prominent future generals as Darius N. Couch, George Pickett, Jesse L. Reno, George Stoneman, Truman Seymour, Cadmus M. Wilcox, and George B. McClellan. His future commander, Thomas J. "Stonewall" Jackson, was in the same class, but the two did not get along. Hill had a higher social status in Virginia and valued having a good time in his off-hours. In contrast, Jackson scorned levity and practiced his religion more fervently than Hill could tolerate.

In 1844, Hill returned from a furlough with a case of gonorrhea, causing medical complications that caused him to miss so many classes that he had to repeat his third year. Reassigned to the class of 1847, he made new friendships, in particular with Henry Heth and Ambrose Burnside. Hill continued to suffer from the effects of the STI for the rest of his life, being plagued with recurrent prostatitis, which was not treatable before the advent of antibiotics. He may have also suffered urinary incontinence due to inflammation of the prostate pressing on his urethra, which could also lead to uremic poisoning and kidney damage.

He graduated in 1847, ranking 15th of 38. He was appointed to the 1st U.S. Artillery as a brevet second lieutenant. He served in a cavalry company during the final months of the Mexican–American War but fought in no major battles. After some garrison assignments along the Atlantic seaboard, he served in the Seminole Wars, again arriving near the war's end and fighting various minor skirmishes. He was promoted to first lieutenant in September 1851.

== Career ==
Robertson's biography of Hill quotes his wife Kitty as saying her husband "never owned slaves and never approved of the institution of slavery." His family, however, was involved with the institution. In the 1850 census, Thomas Hill (Hill's father) owned 20 enslaved people in Culpeper County. Ten years later, Thomas Hill Jr. owned at least 38 enslaved people in Culpeper County. Hill's uncle Ambrose P. Hill, for whom he was named, was also a major planter in Culpeper County, Virginia, based on using enslaved labor. In the 1840 census, the senior Ambrose P. Hill enslaved 32 people, 30 people in the 1850 census, and 10 in 1860.

From 1855 to 1860, A. P. Hill worked for the United States Coast Survey. He was once engaged to Ellen B. Marcy before her parents pressured her to break off the engagement. She married Hill's West Point roommate George B. McClellan, who later was Commanding General of the United States Army. Although Hill denied he felt ill will afterward, during the war, a rumor spread that Hill always fought harder if he knew McClellan was present with the opposing army because of Ellen's earlier rejection.

On July 18, 1859, Hill married Kitty ("Dolly") Morgan McClung, a young widow. He became the brother-in-law of future Confederate cavalry generals John Hunt Morgan (Hill's best man at the wedding) and Basil W. Duke.

=== American Civil War ===
==== Early months ====
On March 1, 1861, after some slave states had declared secession from the United States, and as the Virginia Secession Convention of 1861 met, Hill resigned his United States Army commission. After Virginia declared secession, Hill accepted a commission as colonel of the 13th Virginia Infantry Regiment, which included units from his native Culpeper County, and nearby Orange, Louisa and Frederick Counties, as well as the Lanier Guards of Maryland and the Frontier Rifles of Hampshire County in what would soon become West Virginia. The 13th Virginia was one of the regiments in Brig. Gen. Joseph E. Johnston's army that was transported by the railroad as reinforcements to the First Battle of Bull Run, but Hill and his men were sent to guard the Confederate right flank near Manassas and saw no action during the battle. Hill was promoted to brigadier general on February 26, 1862, and commanded a brigade in the (Confederate) Army of the Potomac.

==== Light Division ====
In the Peninsula Campaign of 1862, Hill performed well as a brigade commander at the Battle of Williamsburg, where his brigade blunted a U.S. attack, and was promoted to major general and division command on May 26. Hill's new division was composed mainly of brigades pulled from the Carolinas and Georgia.

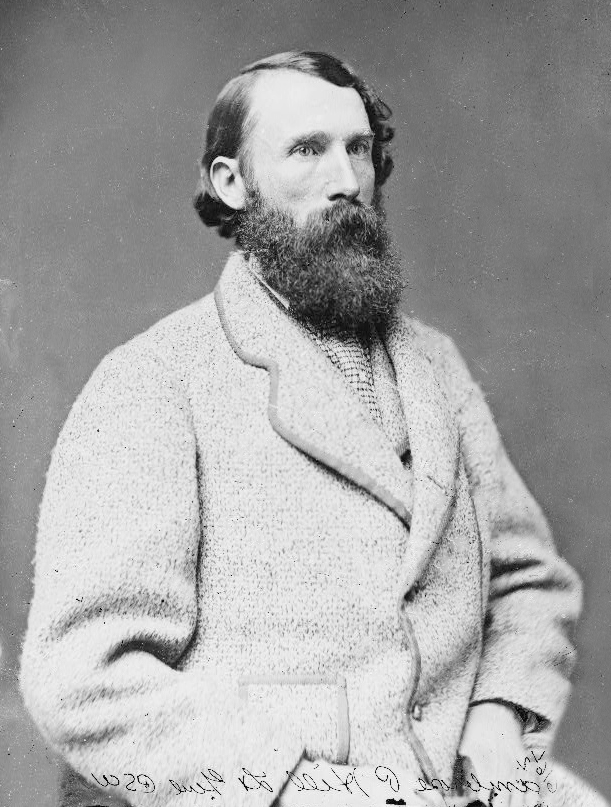
General A. P. Hill

His division did not participate in the Battle of Seven Pines (May 31 – June 1), the battle in which Joseph E. Johnston was wounded and replaced in command of the Army of Northern Virginia by Robert E. Lee. June 1 was the first day Hill began using a nickname for his division: the Light Division. This contradictory name for the largest division in all Confederate armies may have been selected because Hill wished his men a reputation for speed and agility. One of Hill's soldiers wrote after the war, "The name was applicable, for we often marched without coats, blankets, knapsacks, or any other burdens except our arms and haversacks, which were never heavy and sometimes empty."

Hill's rookie division was in the thick of the fighting during the Seven Days Battles, being heavily engaged at Mechanicsville, Gaines Mill, and Glendale. Following the campaign, Hill became involved in a dispute with James Longstreet over a series of newspaper articles that appeared in the Richmond Examiner; relations between them deteriorated to the point that Hill was placed under arrest and Hill challenged Longstreet to a duel. Following the Seven Days Battles, Lee reorganized the army into two corps and assigned Hill's division to Stonewall Jackson. Their relationship was less than amicable, and the two quarreled many times. Hill frequently found himself under arrest by Jackson.

At the Battle of Cedar Mountain on August 9, Hill launched a counterattack that stabilized the Confederate left flank, preventing it from being routed. Three weeks later, at the Second Battle of Bull Run (Second Manassas), Hill was placed on the Confederate left along the unfinished railroad cut and held it against repeated U.S. attacks. During the campaign, Hill became involved in several minor disputes with Jackson concerning Jackson's marching orders to Hill.

Hill's performance at the Battle of Antietam was particularly noteworthy. While Lee's army was enduring strong attacks by the U.S. Army of the Potomac outside Sharpsburg, Maryland, Hill's Light Division had been left behind to process U.S. prisoners of war at Harpers Ferry. Responding to an urgent call for assistance from Lee, Hill marched his men at a grueling pace and reached the battlefield just in time to counterattack a strong forward movement by the corps of Maj. Gen. Ambrose Burnside, which threatened to destroy Lee's right flank. Hill's arrival neutralized the threat, ending the battle with Lee's army battered but undefeated. Hours after the battle, Hill told an inquisitive major that Burnside owed him $8,000. During the retreat back to Virginia, he had his division push back a few regiments from the U.S. V Corps.

At the Battle of Fredericksburg in December 1862, Hill was positioned near the Confederate right along a ridge; because of some swampy ground along his front, there was a 600-yard gap in Hill's front line, and the nearest brigade behind it was nearly a quarter mile away; the dense vegetation prevented the brigade commander from seeing any Union soldiers advancing on his position. During the battle, Maj. Gen. George Meade's division routed two of Hill's brigades and part of a third. Hill required assistance from Maj. Gen. Jubal A. Early's division to repulse the U.S. attack. Hill's division suffered over 2,000 casualties during the battle, which was nearly two-thirds of the casualties in Jackson's corps; two of his brigade commanders were wounded, one (Maxcy Gregg) mortally. After the battle, one of his brigade commanders, Brig. Gen. James J. Archer, criticized him for the gap left in the division's front line, saying that Hill had been warned about it before the battle but had done nothing to correct it. Hill was also absent from his division, and there is no record of where he was during the battle; this led to a rumor spread through the lines that he had been captured during the initial U.S. assault.

Hill and Jackson argued several times during the Northern Virginia Campaign and 1862 Maryland Campaign. During the invasion of Maryland, Jackson had Hill arrested and charged him with eight counts of dereliction of duty after the campaign. During the lull in campaigning following the Battle of Fredericksburg, Hill repeatedly requested that Lee set up a court of inquiry. Still, the commanding general did not wish to lose his two experienced lieutenants' effective teamwork, so he refused to approve Hill's request. Their feud was put aside whenever a battle was being fought and then resumed afterward, a practice that lasted until the Battle of Chancellorsville in May 1863. There, Jackson was accidentally wounded by the 18th North Carolina Infantry of Hill's division. Hill briefly took command of the Second Corps and was wounded himself in the calves of his legs. While in the infirmary, he requested that the cavalry commander, J. E. B. Stuart, take his place in command.

==== Third Corps commander ====
After Jackson's death from pneumonia related to wounds received, Hill was promoted on May 24, 1863, to lieutenant general (becoming the Army of Northern Virginia's fourth-highest-ranking general) and placed in command of the newly created Third Corps of Lee's army, which he led in the Gettysburg campaign of 1863. One of Hill's divisions, led by his West Point classmate Maj. Gen. Henry Heth, was the first to engage Union soldiers at the Battle of Gettysburg. Although the first day of the battle was a resounding Confederate success, Hill received much postbellum criticism from proponents of the Lost Cause movement, suggesting that he had unwisely brought on a general engagement against orders before Lee's army was fully concentrated. His division under Maj. Gen. Richard H. Anderson fought in the unsuccessful second day assaults against Cemetery Ridge, while his favorite division commander, Maj. Gen. William Dorsey Pender, commanding the Light Division, was severely wounded, which prevented that division from cooperating with the assault. On the third day, two-thirds of the men in Pickett's Charge were from Hill's corps, but Robert E. Lee chose James Longstreet to be the overall commander of the assault. Of all three infantry corps of the Army of Northern Virginia, Hill's suffered the most casualties at Gettysburg, which prompted Lee to order them to lead the retreat from Gettysburg.

During the Bristoe Campaign of the same year, Hill launched his Corps "too hastily" in the Battle of Bristoe Station and was bloodily repulsed by Maj. Gen. Gouverneur K. Warren's II Corps. Lee did not criticize him for this afterward but ordered him to detail himself to the dead and wounded after hearing his account. Hill's corps also participated in the Battle of Mine Run. Other than a brief visit to Richmond in January 1864, Hill remained with his corps in its winter encampments near Orange Court House.

In the Overland Campaign of 1864, Hill's corps held back multiple U.S. attacks during the first day of the Battle of the Wilderness but became severely disorganized as a result. Despite several requests from his division commanders, Hill refused to straighten and strengthen his line during the night, possibly due to Lee's plan to relieve them at daylight. At dawn on the second day of the battle, the Union army launched an attack that briefly drove Hill's corps back, with several units routed, but the First Corps under Longstreet arrived just in time to reinforce him. Hill was medically incapacitated with an unspecified illness at the Battle of Spotsylvania Court House, so Maj. Gen. Jubal Early temporarily took command of the Third Corps. Still, Hill could hear that his men were doing well and observed the battle at Lee's side. After recovering and regaining his corps, he was later rebuked by Lee for his piecemeal attacks at the Battle of North Anna. By then, Lee was too ill to coordinate his subordinates in springing a planned trap against Union forces. Hill held the Confederate left flank at Cold Harbor, but two divisions of his corps were used to defend against the main U.S. attack on the right flank on June 3; when part of the troops to his right gave way, Hill used one brigade to launch a successful counterattack.

During the Siege of Petersburg of 1864–65, Hill and his men participated in several battles during the various U.S. offensives, particularly Jerusalem Plank Road, the Crater, Globe Tavern, Second Ream's Station, and Peebles' Farm. During the Battle of the Crater, he fought against his West Point classmate Ambrose Burnside, whom the former repulsed at Antietam and Fredericksburg. After the Battle of the Crater, Hill paraded 1,500 Union prisoners through Petersburg, where they were mocked by racist onlookers.

Hill was ill several times that winter; in March 1865, his health had deteriorated to the point where he had to recuperate in Richmond until April 1, 1865.

== Death ==
Hill had said he had no desire to live to see the collapse of the Confederacy. On April 2, 1865 (during the U.S. breakthrough in the Third Battle of Petersburg, just seven days before Lee's surrender at the Battle of Appomattox Court House), he was shot dead by a Union soldier, Corporal John W. Mauk of the 138th Pennsylvania Infantry, as he rode to the front of the Petersburg lines, accompanied by one staff officer. Hill had attempted to induce the Union soldiers to surrender. Instead, the Union soldiers refused and shot Hill through the chest. The rifle bullet traveled through his heart, exited his chest, and sliced off his left thumb. Hill fell to the ground and died within moments.

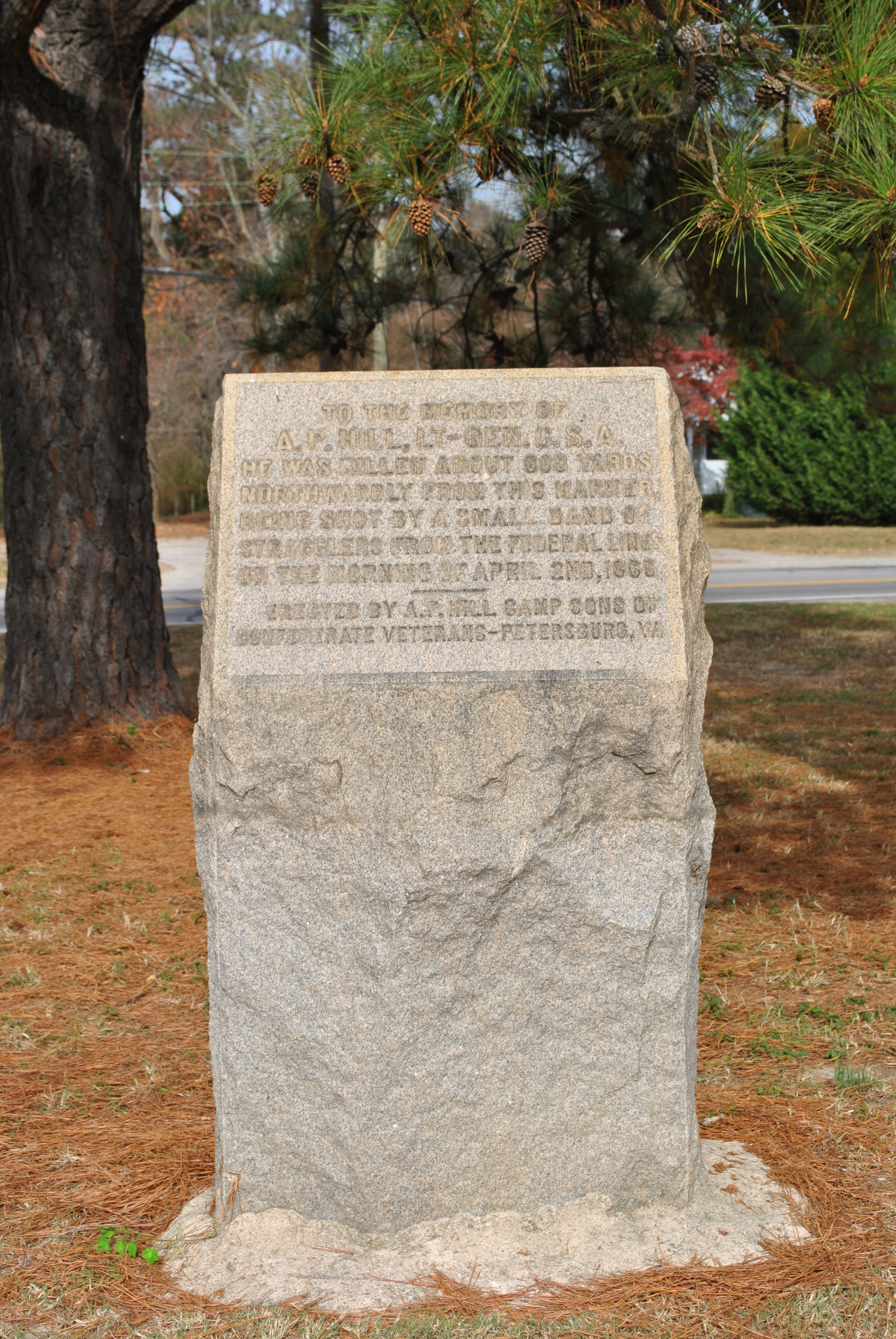

In the late nineteenth century, interest developed in trying to locate and memorialize the site where Hill was killed, with apparent attempts made to locate the site in 1888, 1890, and 1903. It was not until 1911, however, that the Sons of Confederate Veterans undertook a careful study and located where Hill fell.

In April 1912, the SCV unveiled two monuments denoting the death of A. P. Hill in Dinwiddie County. The larger of these two monuments is located at the Boydton Plank Road and Duncan Road intersection.

The monument reads:

"To the memory of A.P. Hill, Lt-Gen. C.S.A. He was killed about 600 yards northwardly from this marker, being shot by a small band of stragglers from the Federal lines on the morning of April 2, 1865.

Erected by A.P. Hill Camp Sons of Confederate Veterans-Petersburg, Va."

This location was thought to be chosen because it was easily accessible from the road. A small parking area is located behind the monument on Duncan Road, making it easy and safe to visit and access. The marker is located at GPS coordinates: 37° 11.365′ N, 77° 28.52′ W.

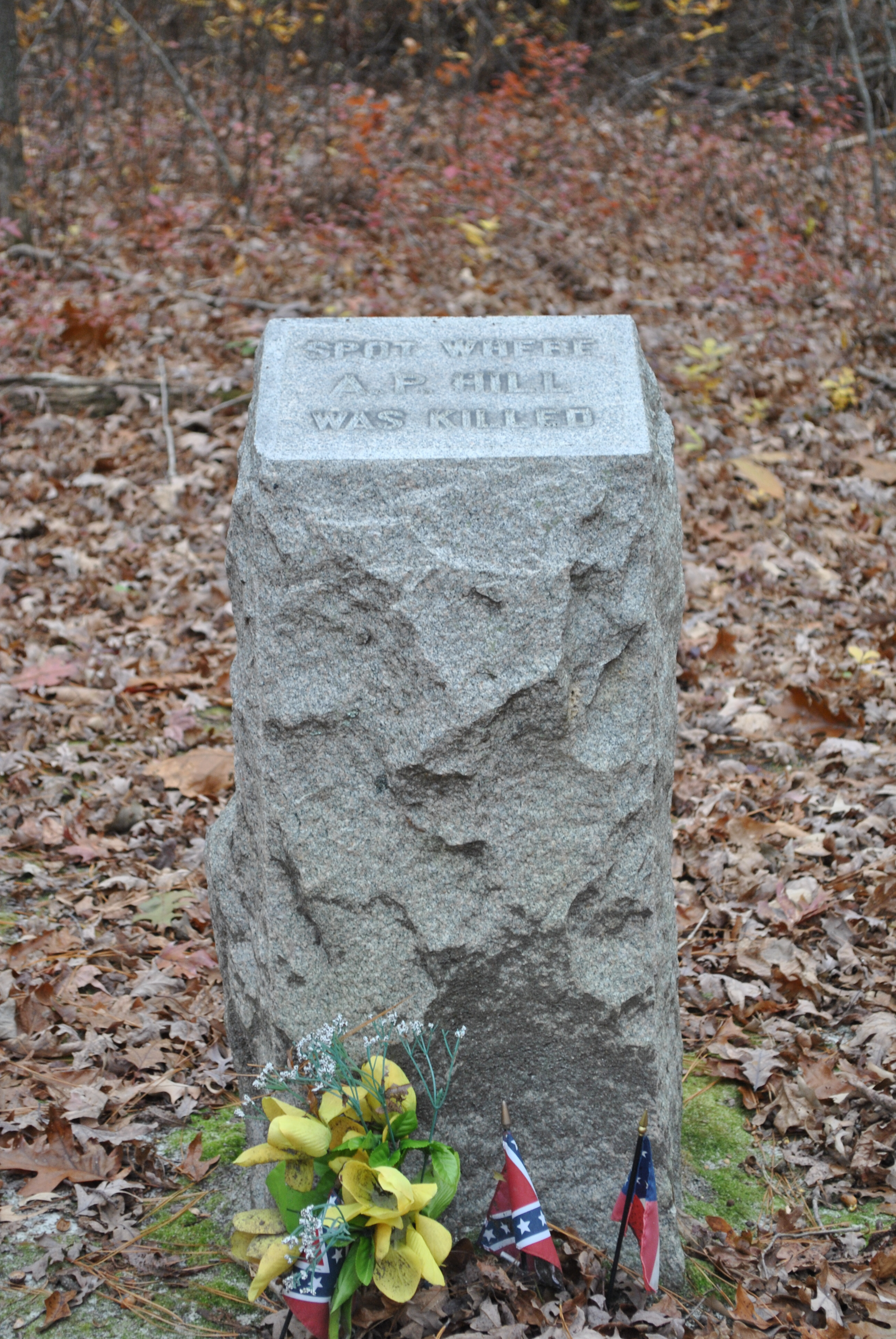

The SCV also marked what was thought in April 1912 to be the exact site where Hill fell. The small granite marker at the site reads:

Spot where A.P. Hill Was Killed

The GPS coordinates for this marker are: 37° 11.553′ N, 77° 28.847′ W. It is approximately a half mile from the larger stone. The marker is located near Sentry Hill Court and is on land that the American Battlefield Trust preserved. It is publicly accessible via a short trail.

Hill's widow and his surviving children attended the unveiling ceremony for the two markers.

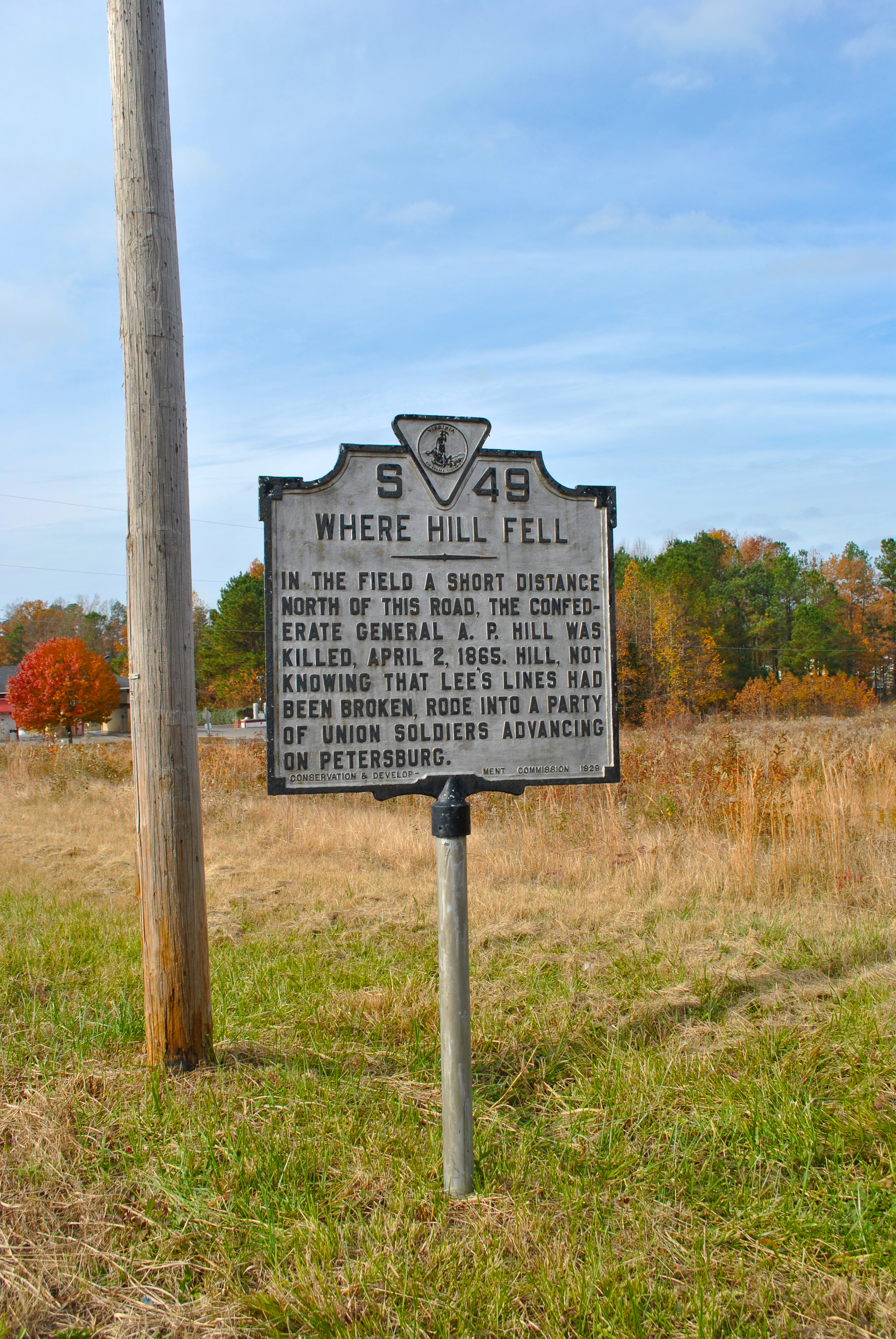

Across the Boydton Plank Road (US 1) from the "Memory" marker is a third marker to A. P. Hill. The Conservation & Development Commission erected this marker in 1929. It reads:

In the field a short distance north of this road, the Confederate General A.P. Hill was killed, April 2, 1865. Hill, not knowing that Lee's lines had been broken, rode into a party of Union soldiers advancing on Petersburg.

The marker was replaced as recently as 2015. It is Virginia Historical Marker S-49. It is located just south of the turn-off for the marker in the Sentry Hill area. There is no designated pull-off area for this marker. It is located at GPS coordinates: 37° 11.348′ N, 77° 28.601′ W.

Confederates recovered Hill's corpse shortly afterward. When Lee heard of Hill's death, he tearfully uttered, "He is now at rest, and we who are left are the ones to suffer." Hill's family had hoped to bury Hill in Richmond, but the city's evacuation by the Confederate government during the next days and capture by U.S. forces led to Hill's burial, either in Chesterfield County at Bellgrade Plantation or, as suggested by Virginia's Pickett Society, just south of the James River near Bosher Dam. Per his will, Hill was interred standing up.

== Analysis ==
Hill did not escape controversy during the war. He had a frail physique and suffered from frequent illnesses that reduced his effectiveness at Gettysburg, the Wilderness, and Spotsylvania Court House. (Some historians believe these illnesses were related to the venereal disease he contracted as a West Point cadet.)

Some analysts consider Hill an example of the Peter principle. Although he was extremely successful commanding his famed "Light Division," he was less effective as a corps commander. Historian Larry Tagg described Hill as "always emotional ... so high strung before battle that he had an increasing tendency to become unwell when the fighting was about to commence." This tendency was, to some extent, balanced by the implied combative attitude that he displayed. He often donned a red calico hunting shirt when a battle was about to start, and the men under his command would pass the word, "Little Powell's got on his battle shirt!" and begin to check their weapons.

Wherever the headquarters flag of A.P. Hill floated, whether at the head of a regiment, a brigade, a division, or a corps, in camp or on the battle-field, it floated with a pace and a confidence born of skill, ability and courage, which infused its confidence and courage into the hearts of all who followed it.

— Confederate General James A. Walker

Hill was affectionate with the rank-and-file soldiers, and one officer called him "the most lovable of all Lee's generals." Although it was said that "his manner [was] so courteous as almost to lack decision," his actions were often impetuous and did not lack decision, but judgment.

Nevertheless, Hill was one of the war's most highly regarded generals on either side.

== Legacy ==
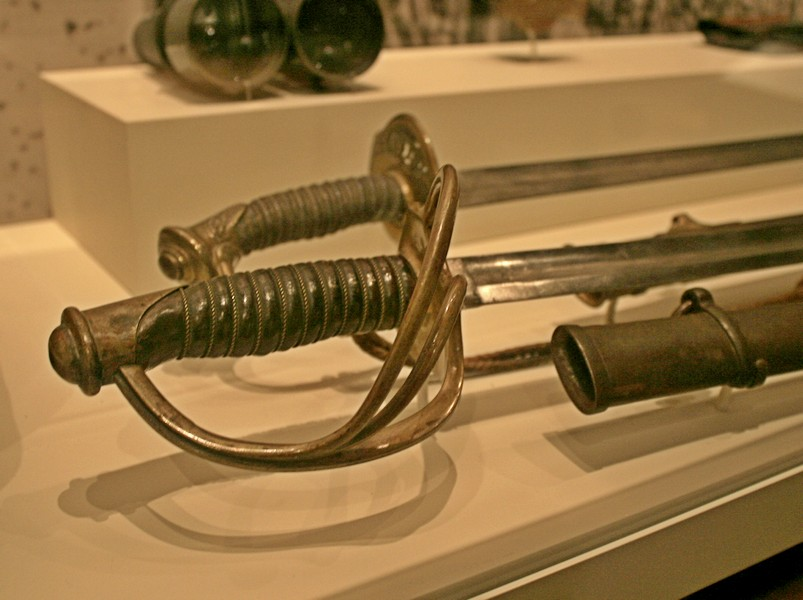
Appomattox, A. P. Hill's sword

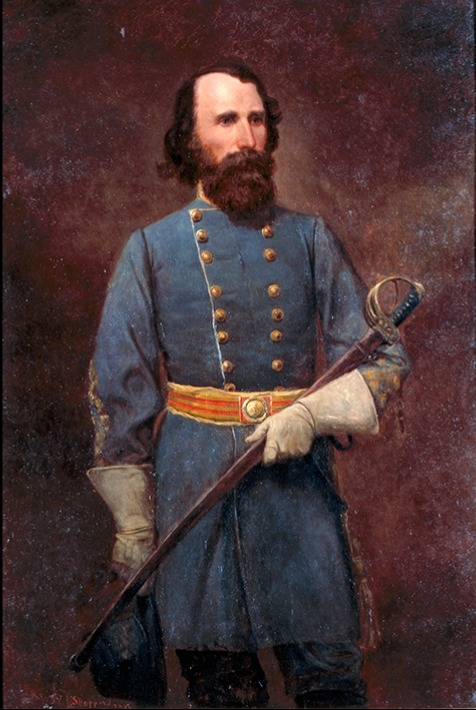
Portrait of Hill by William Ludwell Sheppard, 1898

In 1897, the Sons of Confederate Veterans (SCV) in Petersburg held its first meeting and decided to name its camp after A. P. Hill because he defended the city, his Third Corps included Petersburg's own 12th Virginia Infantry regiment, and because Gen. Hill died in nearby Dinwiddie County during the Third Battle of Petersburg a few days before General Lee surrendered the Army of Northern Virginia. They also erected a marker where Hill fell mortally wounded. Prominent commanders of the camp (lodge) included Congressman Patrick Henry Drewry and Petersburg's multi-term state senator Samuel D. Rodgers. The camp may have lapsed after 1938 but was revived on June 9, 1959, with David Lyon as its Commander. Petersburg also named a school after Hill and others for Lee, Stonewall Jackson, and J.E.B. Stuart.

Hill's sword is on display at the Chesterfield County Museum in Chesterfield, Virginia.

Hill's remains were reinterred twice in Richmond. In February 1867, Hill's remains were reinterred in Richmond's Hollywood Cemetery. During the late 1880s, several former comrades raised funds for a monument to Hill in Richmond. Hill's remains were again transferred, to the base of a monument dedicated on May 30, 1892, on land donated by developer Lewis Ginter. General Henry Heth led the procession to the dedication, and General James A. Walker gave an oration. A bronze statue of Hill, created by Caspar Buberl after William Ludwell Sheppard's design, topped the monument, while its plaster cast was given to the A.P. Hill Camp of Petersburg. The monument was located in the center of the intersection of Laburnum Avenue and Hermitage Road in what is now the city's Hermitage Road Historic District. This monument was the only one of its type in Richmond under which the subject individual was interred. On June 26, 2020, the Hermitage Road Historic District Association released a public statement requesting that the City of Richmond remove and relocate the monument to a more appropriate location. This request occurred within the context of the contemporary Black Lives Matter movement, and further impetus for the removal of Confederate monuments had been provided by protests in Richmond and elsewhere that followed the murder of George Floyd by a Minneapolis police officer in May 2020.

In January 2022, the administration of Richmond mayor Levar Stoney announced that the Richmond statue and remains of Hill would be removed soon. The City of Richmond gained authority to remove monuments to war veterans on public city grounds from legislation signed into law by Virginia Governor Ralph Northam on April 11, 2020. Because Hill was the only Confederate general who was buried under his monument in Richmond, government officials delayed any tampering with the monument until they could find a final resting place for Hill's remains. Following the filing of a lawsuit by members of A. P. Hill's extended family of descendants, who claimed that they, and not the City of Richmond, had the right to determine the disposition of the statue, a Virginia circuit court ruled in favor of the city's plan to transfer the statue to the Black History Museum and Cultural Center of Virginia. The statue was removed on December 12, 2022, after the denial of a motion by the extended family members to stay its removal. It was the last statue of a Confederate officer standing in Richmond. The remains of A. P. Hill, which were exhumed one day later on December 13, were expected to be reinterred in a cemetery in Culpeper, Virginia. Hill was buried in Fairview Cemetery in Culpeper, Virginia, on January 21, 2023. The statue will remain in storage until an appeal by A. P. Hill's descendants is resolved, who want the statue to be relocated to Cedar Mountain Battlefield for it to continue to serve as Hill's grave marker.

The United States military named both a fort and a ship after Hill. Fort A.P. Hill was named after him in 1941, and is located in Caroline County, Virginia, about halfway between Richmond and Washington, D.C. During World War II, the United States Navy named a liberty ship the SS A. P. Hill. In 2020, there were calls to rename U.S. Army installations named after Confederate soldiers, including Fort A.P. Hill. In September 2022, Secretary of Defense Lloyd J. Austin III accepted the Naming Commission's recommendation to rename Fort A.P. Hill in honor of the first female U.S. Army surgeon, Civil War prisoner of war, and Medal of Honor recipient Mary Edwards Walker. Fort Walker received its new name in a ceremony on August 25, 2023.

== In popular culture ==
- Hill is depicted in both of Ronald F. Maxwell's Civil War films, Gettysburg (1993) and Gods and Generals (2003). In the former, he was portrayed by historian and Civil War reenactor Patrick Falci; in the latter, by character actor William Sanderson.

== See also ==
- List of American Civil War generals (Confederate)
- Virginia in the American Civil War
