= Third Corps, Army of Northern Virginia =

- Battle flag of the Army of Northern Virginia
- Active: 1863–1865
- Disbanded: April 12, 1865
- Country: Confederate States
- Branch: Army
- Type: Army Corps
- Part of: Army of Northern Virginia
- Arms: Enfield rifled muskets
- Campaigns: American Civil War; Gettysburg; Wilderness; Spotsylvania; Cold Harbor; Petersburg; Appomattox

Commanders
- Commanders: A. P. Hill †; Henry Heth; Richard Anderson; Jubal Early

The Third Corps, Army of Northern Virginia, was an army corps of the Confederate States Army in the Eastern Theater of the American Civil War.

== Formation ==
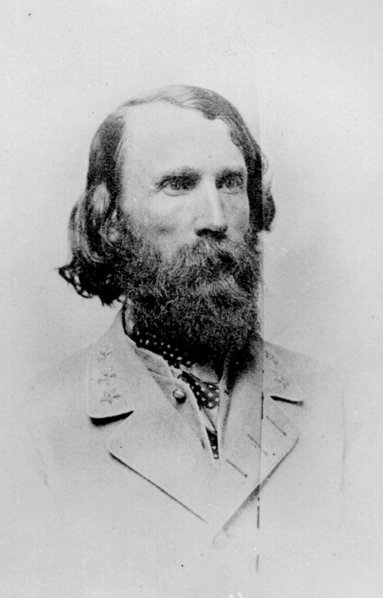
A. P. Hill

After the death of Lt. General Thomas J. Jackson at the Battle of Chancellorsville, Robert E. Lee reorganized his army from two infantry corps into three corps, giving command of the new Third Corps to A. P. Hill. For Hill's new corps, Lee assigned Hill's old "Light Division", commanded by Major General William Dorsey Pender, from the Second Corps and Richard H. Anderson's division from James Longstreet's First Corps. For the Corps' third division, Lee created a new division from two brigades sent from the defenses around Richmond and two brigades from Pender's division, assigning it to the command of Henry Heth. The corps' artillery reserve was commanded by Colonel R. Lindsay Walker.

== 1863 ==
When Lee launched the Gettysburg campaign in June 1863, the Third Corps was initially left along the former Confederate positions along the Rappahannock as a rear guard, following the rest of the army on the 15th after Lee was convinced that Union commander Joseph Hooker would not launch an attack on Richmond. It arrived at Chambersburg on the 27th and rested for several days; on the evening of June 30th, Hill sent Heth's division to Gettysburg to seize a supply of shoes that was reported to be there, with Pender's division assigned to follow as support. On the morning of July 1st, Heth encountered the leading elements of the Army of the Potomac, thus starting the three-day Battle of Gettysburg. During the morning, Heth's division attacked part of the I Corps and was defeated, with Brigadier General James J. Archer captured (the first general officer in Lee's army to be captured). Both Heth's and Pender's divisions attacked during the afternoon and defeated the I Corps; Heth was wounded during the afternoon attack and was replaced by James J. Pettigrew, while Alfred M. Scales of Pender's division was wounded. On the second day, Hill's corps occupied the center of the Confederate army and was assigned to attack the Union line after Longstreet's corps had launched its attack; however, only three of Anderson's five brigades launched an attack. Ambrose R. Wright was able to briefly pierce the Union center on Cemetery Ridge but was forced to retreat. Before he was able to launch an attack with his division, Pender was mortally wounded by an artillery shell and was replaced by Brigadier General James H. Lane. During the day, Hill was ill and did not supervise the attack by his corps.

As part of Lee's plans on July 3, part of Hill's corps took part in Pickett's charge but was placed under Longstreet's command: Pettigrew's division was placed to the left of George Pickett's division, while two of Lane's brigades, placed under the command of Major General Isaac Trimble, formed behind Pettigrew (Lane returned to command his own brigade during the attack). Cadmus Wilcox's and David Lang's brigades of Anderson's division formed on Pickett's right, while the rest of the division formed behind Pettigrew and Trimble as support. For the bombardment before the infantry attack, Walker formed fifty-three cannons along Seminary Ridge. During the attack, one Union regiment attacked Pettigrew's right flank brigade, commanded by John M. Brockenbrough, and routed it, then commenced firing on the next brigade in line. Pettigrew's and Trimble's divisions reached the stone wall on Cemetery Ridge but failed to breach the Union line; the 55th North Carolina Infantry was credited with making the farthest advance of any Confederate regiment during the attack. Pettigrew was wounded during the attack but remained in command of his division; Trimble was wounded and captured near the wall, while two brigade commanders were also wounded and one was killed. Wilcox and Lang started their advance well after the main force had done so; by the time the two brigades reached the Union line, Pickett's division had already started its retreat. Artillery fire and a counterattack by the Vermont Brigade forced them to retreat, with several dozen Confederates falling prisoner and two battle flags captured.

After the battle, Hill's corps was the first to start the Confederate retreat back to Virginia. Heth's division served as the rear guard as the army marched over the Potomac on July 14; during the Battle of Falling Waters, Pettigrew was mortally wounded during a Union cavalry charge. During the fall, Cadmus Wilcox was promoted to major general and given command of Pender's former division. In the Battle of Bristoe Station, Hill attacked the isolated Union II Corps with only two brigades from his three available divisions, but was in turn hit in the flank by the awaiting V Corps. Hill lost heavily, 2,000 men in total along with five cannons. The corps also participated in the Mine Run Campaign; Hill was to assault the Union left flank at dawn on December 1, but the Union army retreated during the night. For the rest of the winter, the corps remained in winter camps south of the Rappahannock River.

== 1864 ==
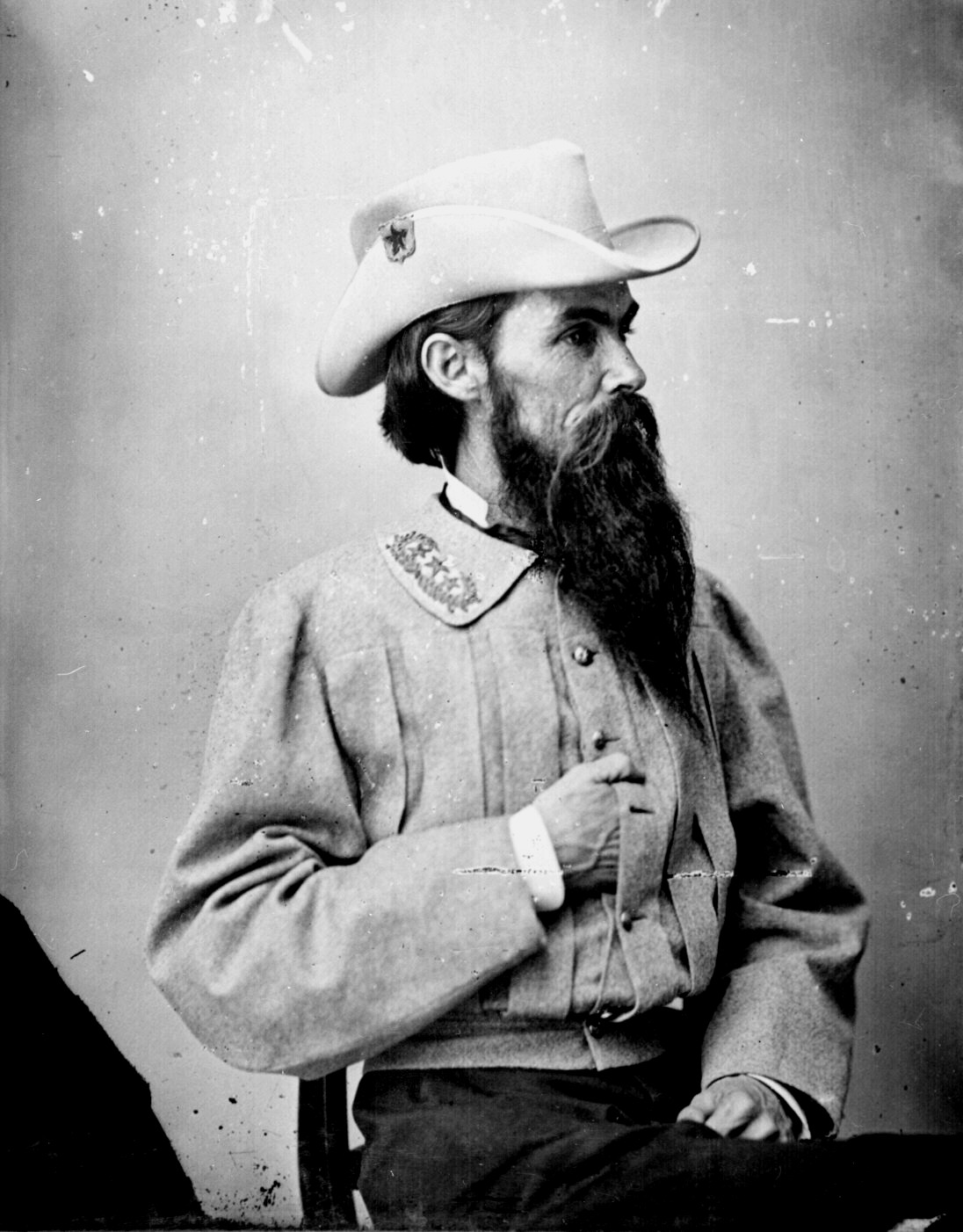
Wartime photo of III Corps divisional commander William Mahone

At the start of the Overland Campaign, the corps started with a strength of over 22,000 men. The Third corps fought on the Confederate right wing during the first day of the Battle of the Wilderness, engaged with the II Corps. By the end of the day, Hill's line was jumbled; both Heth and Wilcox requested permission to straighten their lines during the night but Hill refused, believing that Longstreet would arrive before dawn and relieve his corps. On the second day, the Union army attacked at dawn and quickly drove Hill's troops back in confusion. Longstreet's corps arrived near mid-morning and halted the Union attack. Following Longstreet's wounding, Anderson was transferred to command the First Corps, with William Mahone taking command of Anderson's division. During the march to Spotsylvania Court House on May 8, Hill fell ill and was replaced by Jubal Early from the Second Corps. Early arrived at Spotsylvania near dawn on May 9 and covered the Confederate right wing. The corps held against the attacks of the IX Corps during May 12th but was only able to send two brigades to help with the Confederate counterattacks in the Mule Shoe salient. On May 21, Hill reported that he was well enough to resume command of his corps.

During the Battle of North Anna, the Third Corps was positioned on the Confederate left. On May 23, Wilcox's division attacked the V Corps as it was crossing the North Anna near Jericho Mill; faulty intelligence had led him to believe that only two Union cavalry brigades had crossed the river. Wilcox launched his attack about 6 p.m. and initially routed two Union brigades but was driven back by a Union counterattack before Confederate reinforcements arrived. Wilcox lost 730 men while inflicting only 338 casualties on the Union forces. During the rest of the battle, the corps was engaged in only brief skirmishing. At Cold Harbor, Hill was stationed on the Confederate left flank but on June 2 Mahone's and Wilcox's divisions were moved to the Confederate right in response to the movements of the Union II Corps; Heth's division remained on the left. On June 3, an attack by the Union II Corps briefly overran part of the Confederate line to Hill's left but the Florida Brigade counterattacked and recaptured the line.

Following Cold Harbor, the corps was rushed to the Richmond-Petersburg area where it was engaged in the three-day Second Battle of Petersburg. The corps fought along the Confederate defensive works south of the Appomattox River during the Siege of Petersburg and over the next few months halted several of the Union offenses against the Confederate supply lines, such as at Jerusalem Plank Road, Ream's Station, and the Crater. Hill was ill several times during the siege, which forced him to turn operational control of the corps over to his division commanders, such as at Ream's Station. The corps lost several hundred men due to desertions during the winter.

== 1865 ==
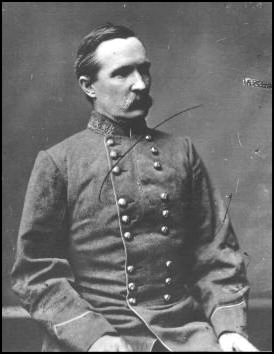
Wartime photo of III Corps divisional commander and temporary corps commander Henry Heth

During the Third Battle of Petersburg, Union assaults overran the Confederate defensive works near Petersburg; while trying to rally his men and to halt the Union advance, Hill ran into Union troops and was killed. Henry Heth temporarily took command of the Third Corps as it evacuated Petersburg but it eventually was merged with James Longstreet's First Corps. The corps' divisions formed part of the Confederate rear guard at Amelia Court House but was shifted to the front of the army as the Confederates marched over Sailor's Creek. Following the Confederate defeat in the Battle of Sailor's Creek, Mahone's division covered the retreat from the creek. At the Battle of Cumberland Church, Mahone's division formed the Confederate left flank and repulsed a Union attack, while Wilcox's division covered the Confederate right flank. For the rest of the campaign, the corps saw only minor skirmishing as part of the Confederate rear guard and surrendered with the rest of the Confederate army on April 9.

== See also ==
- First Corps, Army of Northern Virginia
- Second Corps, Army of Northern Virginia
- Fourth Corps, Army of Northern Virginia
- Cavalry Corps, Army of Northern Virginia
