= Thomas Horan =

Thomas Horan may refer to:

- Thomas Horan (Medal of Honor) (1839–1902), Medal of Honor recipient
- Thomas Horan (cricketer, born 1886), Australian cricketer
- Tom Horan (1854–1916), Australian cricketer
