= 72nd New York Infantry Regiment =

- Active: July 24, 1861 – October 31, 1864
- Country: United States of America
- Branch: Union Army
- Type: Infantry
- Part of: Excelsior Brigade
- Nickname: "Third Excelsior Regiment"
- Engagements: American Civil War: Siege of Yorktown; Battle of Williamsburg; Battle of Seven Pines; Seven Days Battles; Battle of Oak Grove; Battle of Savage's Station; Battle of White Oak Swamp; Battle of Glendale; Battle of Malvern Hill; Manassas Station Operations; Second Battle of Bull Run; Battle of Fredericksburg; Battle of Chancellorsville; Battle of Gettysburg; Battle of Wapping Heights; Battle of Bristoe Station; Mine Run Campaign; Overland Campaign; Battle of the Wilderness; Battle of Spotsylvania Court House; Battle of North Anna; Battle of Totopotomoy Creek; Battle of Cold Harbor; Siege of Petersburg

Commanders
- Colonel: Nelson Taylor
- Colonel: William O. Stevens
- Colonel: John S. Austin

Insignia
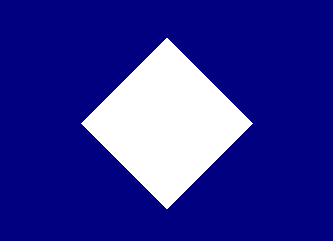
- 2nd Division, III Corps

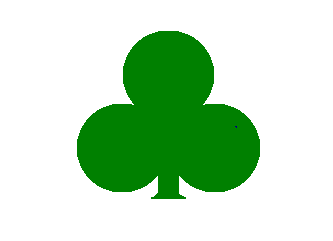
- 4th Division, II Corps

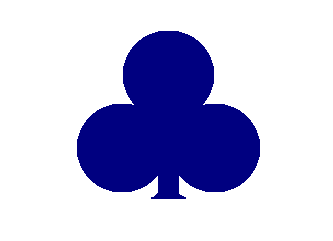
- 3rd Division, II Corps

Dr. Charles K. Irwin, 72nd New York, Culpeper, Virginia, September 1863.

The 72nd New York Infantry Regiment was one of five infantry regiments formed by former U.S. Congressman Daniel Sickles (Note: Born to a wealthy family in New York City, Sickles was involved in a number of scandals, most notably the 1859 homicide of his wife's lover, U.S. Attorney Philip Barton Key II, whom Sickles gunned down in broad daylight in Lafayette Square, across the street from the White House. He was acquitted after using temporary insanity as a legal defense for the first time in United States history. Upon the outbreak of the American Civil War in 1861, Sickles became one of the war's most prominent political generals, recruiting the New York regiments that became known as the Excelsior Brigade in the Army of the Potomac. Despite his lack of military experience, he served as a brigade, division, and corps commander in some of the early Eastern campaigns.) and established as part of the Excelsior Brigade which fought with the Union Army during multiple key engagements of the American Civil War, including the Chancellorsville Campaign in Virginia, the Battle of Gettysburg in Pennsylvania, and the Overland Campaign. Leaders from the 72nd New York recruited men from New Jersey, as well as from cities and small towns across the State of New York.

== Service ==
Raised by former U.S. Congressman Daniel Sickles, under authority of the U.S. War Department on May 18, 1861, the 72nd New York Infantry was organized at Camp Scott on Staten Island, New York with its members mustering in there from June through November 1861. Listed on its rosters were men from New York City, who were assigned to Companies A, H or K; members of the 68th Militia from Dunkirk, who were assigned to Companies D, E and H; and recruits from Newark, New Jersey, who were assigned to Company F. Companies B, C, G, and I were staffed, respectively, by men from the New York State communities of Jamestown, Vermont, Westfield, and Delhi while Company L was composed of men from Delhi, Plattsburg and Sinclairsville, as well as from Massachusetts and New Jersey (Note: In "Report of the Adjutant-General". Saratoga Springs, New York: New York State Military Museum and Veterans Research Center.) Commanded initially by Colonel Nelson Taylor, the regiment was awarded its state number on December 11.

Part of Sickles' Excelsior Brigade, the 72nd New York participated in many of the war's most significant battles. Transported to Washington, D.C., the members of this regiment were initially attached to Division of the Potomac (Sickles' Brigade), and assigned to defend the city before participating in the Union Army's expedition to lower Maryland (September 15–October 2, 1861). They were then reassigned as Sickles' Brigade to the U.S. Army of the Potomac in October as part of the division commanded by Brigadier-General Joseph Hooker. Their next significant deployment came as part of the U.S. Army's Third Corps, Second Division when they engaged in the Union Army's advance on Manassas, Virginia (March 10, 1862), the expedition from Dumfries to Fredericksburg, capture of stores (March 18), and reconnoissance from Liverpool Point to Stafford Court House and subsequent operations there (April 4). Reassigned to the Peninsula Campaign, they then participated in the Siege of Yorktown, Virginia (April 5–May 4, 1862), and incurred heavy casualties in the Battle of Williamsburg (May 5). By the time that battle was over, nearly 200 members of the regiment had been killed or wounded, a loss rate which the regiment would not experience again for the remainder of the war. Next engaged in the Battle of Seven Pines/Fair Oaks (May 31–June 1), the regiment then fought in the Seven Days Battles at Oak Grove (June 25), the Peach Orchard and Savage's Station (June 29), White Oak Swamp and Glendale (June 30), and Malvern Hill (July 1 and August 5). Transferred from the Peninsula during the fall of 1862, the regiment saw heavy action in the Union's Manassas Station Operations (August 25–27) and the Second Battle of Bull Run (August 28–30).

Engaged later that summer in the Union's Northern Virginia Campaign, under the command of Major-General John Pope, and in operations at Fairfax Station and along the Orange and Alexandria Railroad that fall, the 72nd New York received roughly 200 replacement soldiers in December 1862, bringing the regiment's strength to just over 400. It was then ordered into the Battle of Fredericksburg (December 12–15), where it remained in the field under arms and without tents for 50 hours before retreating with other Union Army troops.

Encamped at Falmouth, Virginia through April 1863, the regiment participated in Major-General Ambrose Burnside's Mud March (January 1863) and in operations at Rappanhannock Bridge and Grove Church (February 5–7) before being ordered on to the Chancellorsville Campaign. During this phase of duty, the 72nd New York lost nearly one-fourth of its members in the intense combat of the Battle of Chancellorsville on May 7, including the regiment's commanding officer, Colonel William O. Stevens, who died the next day after having been mortally wounded and captured by Confederate States Army troops.

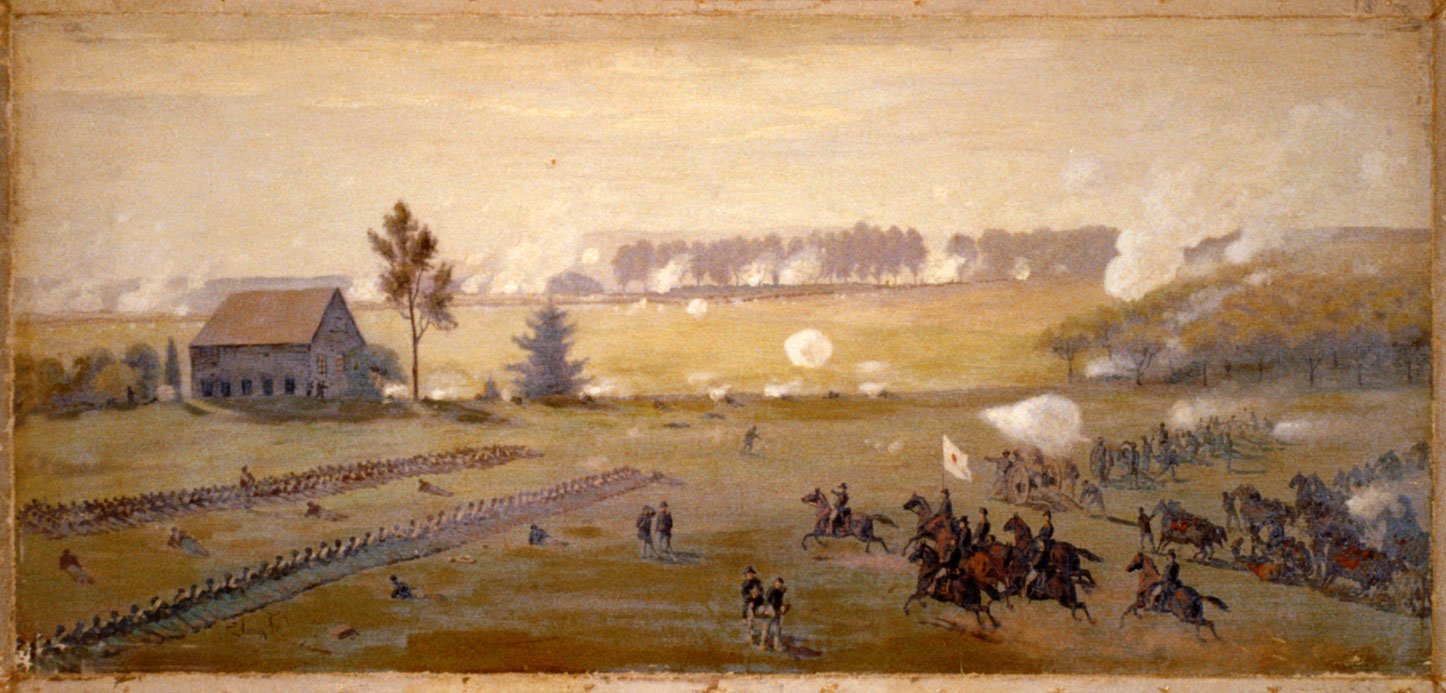
Union Gen. Daniel Sickles rides past his staff to inspect the front lines of the III Corps at the Peach Orchard salient during the second day of the Battle of Gettysburg (July 2, 1863).

Assigned next to the Gettysburg campaign, the 72nd New York fought in the Battle of Gettysburg under the command of Colonel John Austin. Positioned near the Emmettsburg Road, the regiment was forced to retreat when the Third Corps was routed from its advance position. By the time the second day's fight was over, Austin and one-third of the regiment had become casualties, as had Sickles, the regiment's founder, whose leg was so badly damaged by a stray cannon ball that it required amputation. When the engagement was over, the regiment was ordered to pursue Confederate troops from Gettysburg into Maryland and Virginia, and re-engaged with the enemy in the battles of Wapping Heights (July 23), Bristoe Station (October 14) and Kelly's Ford (November 7), as well as in the Mine Run Campaign (November 27–December 2).

Assigned to duties in the vicinity of Brandy Station until early May 1864, the 72nd New York assisted with operations along the Rapidan River (February 6–7), and was then assigned to the Overland Campaign led by Lieutenant-General Ulysses S. Grant. After fighting in the battles of the Wilderness (May 5–7), Spotsylvania Court House (May 8–21), North Anna (May 23–26), Totopotomoy Creek (May 28–31), and Cold Harbor (June 1–12), the regiment also participated in the opening weeks of the Siege of Petersburg until its leaders received orders to begin winding down the regiment's operations. On June 20, Companies A, B, D, E, F, I and K mustered out. Companies C, G, and H were then transferred to the 120th New York Infantry. Company G was then officially mustered out on July 2, followed by Company C on July 20 and Company H on October 31, 1864.

== Notable members ==
- Haight, John H.: Winner of the U.S. Medal of Honor for extraordinary heroism displayed in 1862 during the Battle of Williamsburg, Manassas Station Operations, and Second Battle of Bull Run while serving as a sergeant with the regiment's G Company.
- Thomas Horan: Recipient of the U.S. Medal of Honor after the Battle of Gettysburg.
- Stevens, William O.: After advancing through the ranks, Stevens was commissioned as colonel on September 8, 1862 and placed in charge of the regiment, a post he held until he was killed in action on May 3, 1863 during the Battle of Chancellorsville, Virginia.
- Taylor, Nelson: Founder and first commanding officer of the regiment, Tayor was appointed as Brigadier-General of Volunteers, U.S. Army on September 7, 1862. Elected to the U.S. House of Representatives just prior to the end of the war, he served in Congress from March 4, 1865 to March 3, 1867.
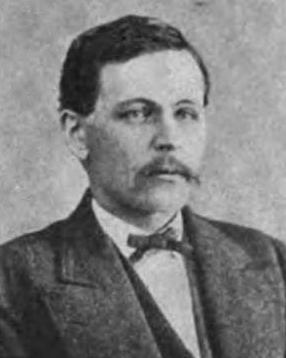
Sgt. John H. Haight

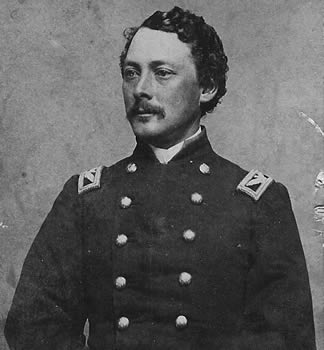
Colonel William O. Stevens

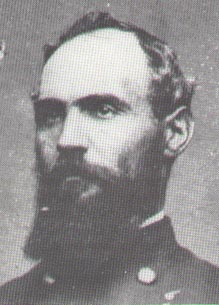
General Nelson Taylor

== Monuments and other memorials ==
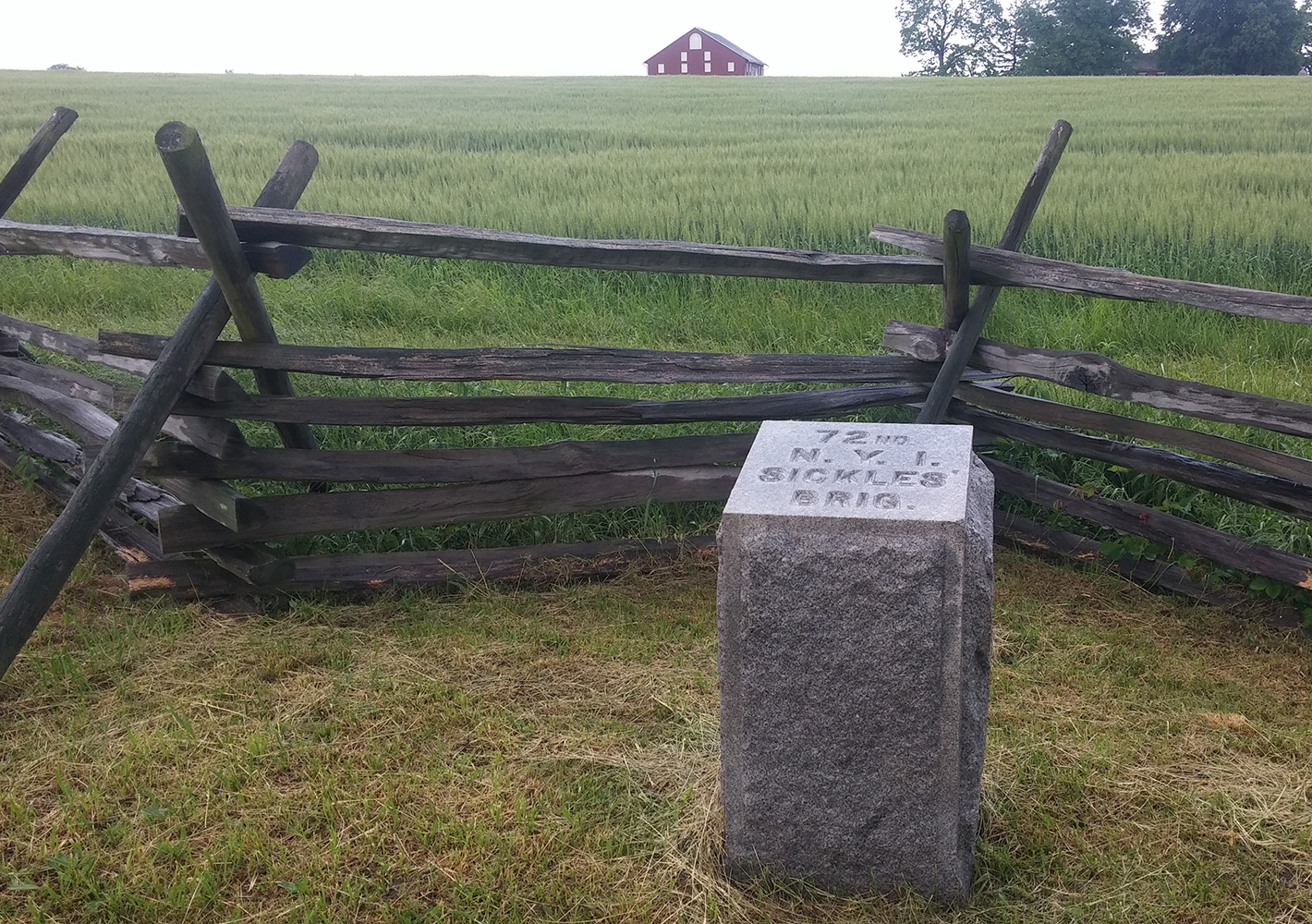
72nd New York Infantry monument, Gettysburg National Battlefield

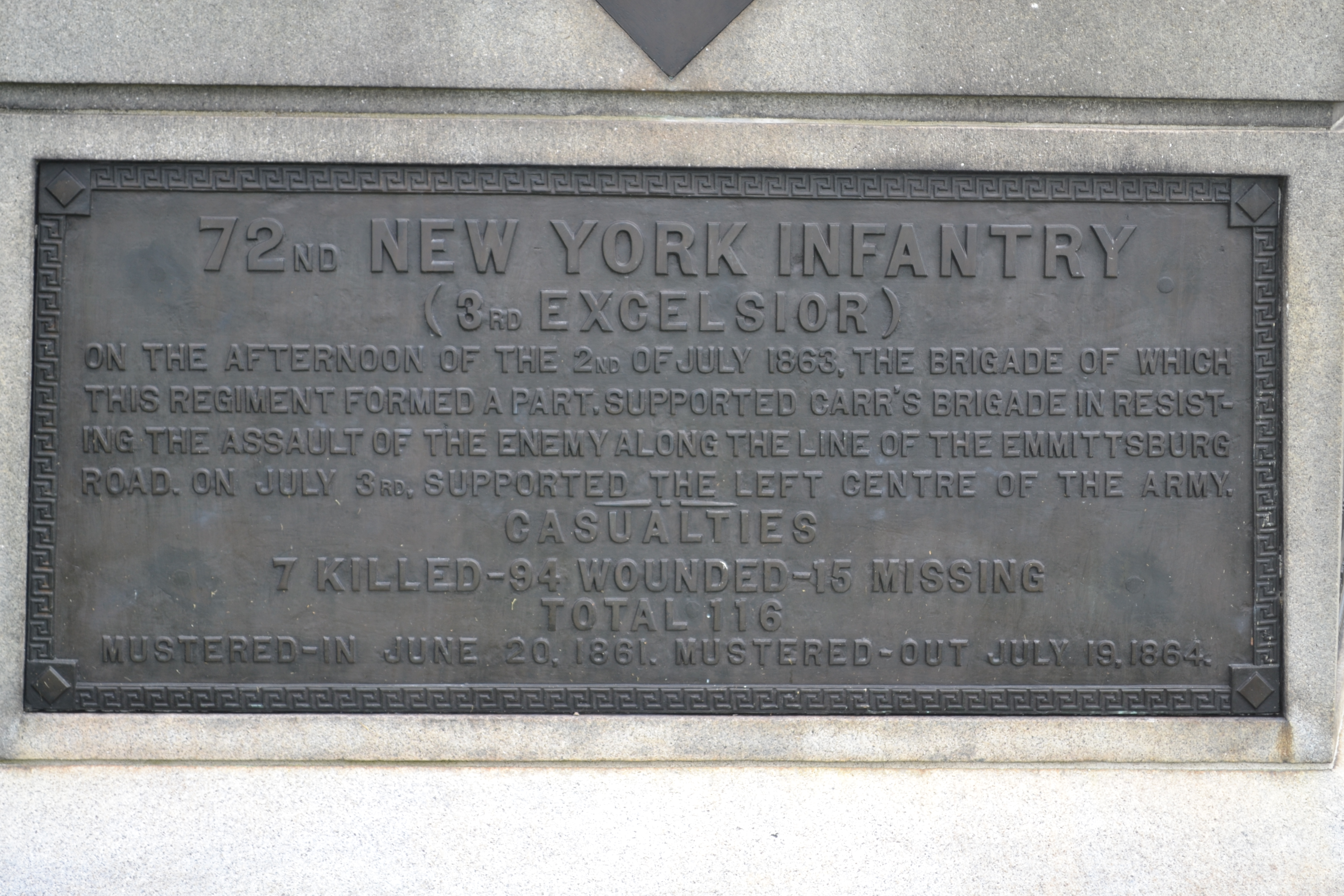
Plaque, 72nd New York Infantry monument, Gettysburg National Battlefield

== See also ==
- List of New York Civil War regiments
- New York in the Civil War
