= John H. Haight =

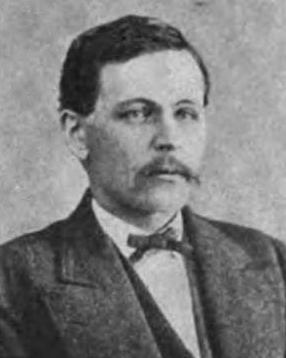
- John H. Haight, c. 1907
- Born: July 1, 1841; Westfield, New York, US
- Died: April 8, 1917 (aged 75); Westfield, New York, US
- Burial place: Ripley, New York
- Military career
- Allegiance: United States
- Branch: United States Army (Union Army)
- Rank: Sergeant
- Units: Company G, 72nd New York Volunteer Infantry Regiment
- Conflicts: American Civil War: Peninsula Campaign; Siege of Yorktown; Battle of Williamsburg; Battle of Seven Pines/Fair Oaks; Seven Days Battles; Battle of Oak Grove; Battle of Savage's Station; Battle of White Oak Swamp; Battle of Glendale; Battle of Malvern Hill; Northern Virginia Campaign; Manassas Station Operations (Stonewall Jackson); Second Battle of Bull Run
- Awards: Medal of Honor

John H. Haight (July 1, 1841 - April 8, 1917) was a United States soldier who fought with the Union Army during the American Civil War as a member of the 72nd New York Infantry. He was recognized with his nation's highest honor for valor, the U.S. Medal of Honor, for the extraordinary heroism he displayed in 1862 during the Battle of Williamsburg, Manassas Station Operations, and Second Battle of Bull Run.

== Formative years ==
Born in Westfield, New York on July 1, 1841, John H. Haight was a son of Henry A. Haight (1799–1845) and Nancy (Griffin) Haight (1806–1898). He and his siblings, Ashley (1826–1852), Charles Edward (1832–1894), Oscar (born c. 1835), Sarah M. (1836–1912), Frances (born c. 1838), and George (1843–1862), spent their formative years with their parents in Chautauqua County, New York — years which were marked by two major transitions: the death of their father in 1845, and the remarriage of their mother, six years later, to Albert Scott, a farmer in Westfield.

== Civil War ==
John H. Haight and his younger brother, George, became two of New York's earliest responders to President Abraham Lincoln's call for volunteers to defend Washington, D.C. following the mid-April 1861 fall of Fort Sumter to Confederate States Army troops. After his brother mustered in for a three-year term of service as a private with Company E of the 72nd New York Volunteer Infantry Regiment on June 20, 1861, John Haight then also enlisted, at the age of 22, for a three-year term on July 17, 1861 in Westfield, New York. Also officially mustering in with the 72nd New York Infantry, John Haight did so on July 24 as a private with the regiment's G Company. He was then promoted to the rank of corporal on September 1. Initially under the command Colonel Nelson Taylor, the Haight brothers and their regiment were transported to Washington, D.C., where they assisted in the defense of the city before participating in the Union Army's expedition to lower Maryland (September 15–October 2, 1861). They were then reassigned with Sickles' Brigade to the U.S. Army of the Potomac in October as part of the division commanded by Brigadier-General Joseph Hooker. Their next significant deployment came as part of the U.S. Army's Third Corps, Second Division when they engaged in the Union Army's advance on Manassas, Virginia (March 10, 1862), the expedition from Dumfries to Fredericksburg, capture of stores (March 18), and reconnoissance from Liverpool Point to Stafford Court House and subsequent operations there (April 4).

Reassigned with their regiment to the Peninsula Campaign, it was during this phase of service that one of the Haight brothers would be killed in action while the other would perform the heroic acts which would ultimately lead to his being awarded the U.S. Medal of Honor. Participants in the Siege of Yorktown, Virginia (April 5–May 4, 1862), they fought together in the Battle of Williamsburg (May 5). On that day, John Haight was severely wounded in action while carrying a wounded comrade to safety. In recalling his actions later for an interview by historians W. F. Beyer and O. F. Keydel, John Haight described what happened:

I was out on the skirmish line with our company at the time, and after holding our position for some time, the firing of the enemy was so severe that we were compelled to retreat. This we did slowly, paying back shot for shot.

We had retreated to a place of comparative safety, when I noticed that my comrade R. B. Wilson, was missing, having been wounded or killed in the retreat. My captain called for someone to volunteer to assist him in bringing Wilson off the field. I volunteered, and we started for the late scene of action.

Not knowing exactly where he had fallen, we spent some time in searching for him. At last we found him and started with him for our lines. While we had been looking for him the enemy had completely surrounded us and cut off our escape. I tried to attract their attention so that the captain could manage to escape, and in so doing was shot in the left groin, received a pretty severe scratch across both legs, and a buckshot wound in the belt.

I fell, and was immediately taken prisoner, but the next day, when they found I was unable to walk I was let out on parole. I managed to return to my company, then at Harrison's Landing.

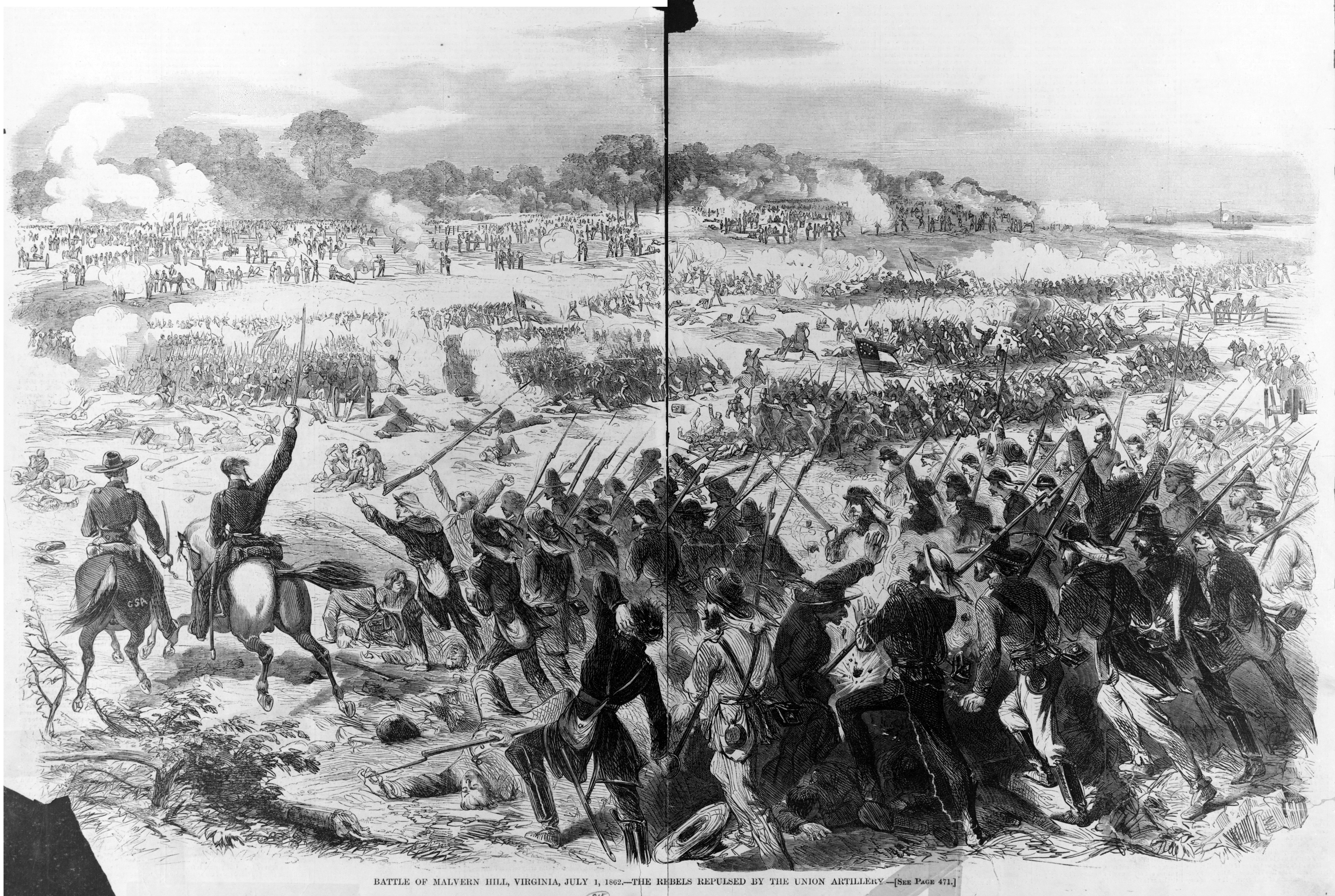
The last of the Seven Days Battles, Malvern Hill (July 1, 1862), claimed the life of John Haight's brother, George.

While his brother recuperated from his battle wounds, George Haight continued to fight on with the 72nd New York, engaging the enemy in the Battle of Seven Pines/Fair Oaks (May 31–June 1). Reunited that summer, the brothers then fought with their respective companies in the Seven Days Battles, including at Oak Grove (June 25), the Peach Orchard and Savage's Station (June 29), White Oak Swamp, Glendale (June 30), and Malvern Hill (July 1), where George Haight was killed by enemy fire. Just over three weeks later, on July 23, 1862, John Haight was promoted to the rank of sergeant.

Transferred from the Peninsula during the fall of 1862, Sergeant John Haight and his fellow 72nd New York Volunteers next saw heavy action in the Union's Manassas Station Operations (August 25–27) and the Second Battle of Bull Run (August 28–30). Once again, Haight demonstrated Medal of Honor-winning valor:

On August 27, 1862, at the battle of Bristow (sic) Station, I was suffering greatly from a severe carbuncle on my neck. On this account I was ordered to the rear before the battle commenced. From my dreary position I could hear the distant rattle of musketry, and longed to be with my comrades. Soon I began to formulate schemes whereby I could rejoin my regiment. I gave this up and decided simply to forget my orders and join my company. Here I fought until the battle was over, when I fainted and had to be carried from the field.

John Haight then saved the lives of more members of his regiment while fighting with the 72nd New York in the Second Battle of Bull Run on August 29. According to Beyer and Keydel:

The company, to which he belonged, was flanked and compelled to fall back upon the main body of the brigade. When the retreat had been completed the captain called for volunteers to rescue any wounded that would otherwise fall into the hands of the Confederates. Sergeant Haight and two others immediately volunteered for the service. They advanced towards the enemy's lines under a heavy fire, and succeeded in bringing out Private Plumb and several others whose names are not known.

Honorably discharged on March 1, 1863 from Camp Nelson Taylor in Virginia via a surgeon's certificate of disability, Haight's heroism was declared "extraordinary" 25 years later when he was awarded the U.S. Medal of Honor on June 8, 1888 (see "Medal of Honor citation" below).

== Post-war life ==
Following his honorable discharge from the military, John Haight returned home to Westfield, and resumed life with his mother, stepfather and siblings. By the time of the 1865 New York State Census, he had married Louisa Pike (1842–1932), a native of England. Residing with his wife at his mother's home, he worked as a tinsmith. Five years later, the couple resided in their own home. Their only daughter, Nellie, was then born circa 1880. By 1915, Haight and his wife were once again the sole occupants of their Westfield home.

Haight died in Westfield at the age of 75, on April 8, 1917, and was buried at East Ripley Cemetery in Ripley, New York.

== Medal of Honor citation ==
Rank and organization: Sergeant, Company G, 72d New York Infantry. Place and date: At Williamsburg, Va., May 5, 1862. At Bristol Station, Va., August 27, 1862. At Manassas, Va., August 29-30, 1862. Entered service at: Westfield, N.Y. Date of issue: June 8, 1888. Citation:

The President of the United States of America, in the name of Congress, takes pleasure in presenting the Medal of Honor to Sergeant John H. Haight, United States Army, for extraordinary heroism on May 5, 1862, while serving with Company G, 72d New York Infantry, in action at Williamsburg, Virginia. Sergeant Haight voluntarily carried a severely wounded comrade off the field in the face of a large force of the enemy; in doing so was himself severely wounded and taken prisoner. He went into the fight at Bristol [sic] Station, Virginia, August 27, 29 and 30, 1862, although severely disabled. At Manassas, he volunteered to search the woods for the wounded.

== See also ==
- 72nd New York Volunteer Infantry Regiment
