= Jonathan C. Kirk =

- Born: October 21, 1836; Clinton County, Ohio, US
- Died: July 30, 1907 (aged 70)
- Burial place: Maple Grove Cemetery, Wichita, Kansas, US
- Military career
- Allegiance: United States of America
- Branch: United States Army
- Rank: Captain
- Units: Company F, 20th Indiana Infantry
- Conflicts: American Civil War; Battle of North Anna
- Awards: Medal of Honor

Jonathan C. Kirk (October 21, 1836 - July 30, 1907) was a Union Army soldier in the American Civil War who received the U.S. military's highest decoration, the Medal of Honor.

Kirk was born in Clinton County, Ohio, and he entered service in Wilmington, Ohio. Kirk was awarded the Medal of Honor for his actions at the Battle of North Anna on May 23, 1864 when he single-handedly captured 13 armed Confederate Army soldiers as a captain with Company F, 20th Indiana Infantry.

His Medal of Honor was issued on June 13, 1894.

== Medal of Honor citation ==
The President of the United States of America, in the name of Congress, takes pleasure in presenting the Medal of Honor to Captain Jonathan C. Kirk, United States Army, for extraordinary heroism on 23 May 1864, while serving with Company F, 20th Indiana Infantry, in action at North Anna River, Virginia. Captain Kirk volunteered for dangerous service and single-handedly captured 13 armed Confederate soldiers and marched them to the rear.
