= 34th North Carolina Infantry Regiment =

Infantry regiment of the Confederate States Army

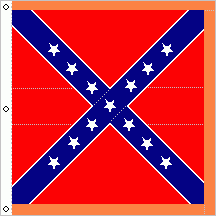
- Active: October 26, 1861 – April 9, 1865
- Country: Confederate States of America
- Allegiance: North Carolina
- Branch: Confederate States Army
- Type: Regiment
- Role: Infantry
- Size: ~ 1,000 (initial); 1,525 (total)
- Engagements: American Civil War: Battle of Mechanicsville; Battle of Gaines's Mill; Battle of Frayser's Farm; Battle of Cedar Mountain; Second Battle of Manassas; Battle of Ox Hill; Battle of Harpers Ferry; Battle of Sharpsburg; Battle of Shepherdstown; Battle of Chancellorsville; Battle of Gettysburg; Battle of Williamsport; Battle of Mine Run; Battle of the Wilderness; Battle of Spotsylvania Court House; Battle of Hanover Junction; Battle of Jerusalem Plank Road; Second Battle of Ream's Station; Battle of Sutherland's Station

Commanders
- Colonels: Collett Leventhorpe; Richard H. Riddick; William Lee J. Lowrance
- Lieutenant Colonel: Charles J. Hammarskold

The 34th North Carolina Infantry Regiment was an infantry regiment of the Confederate States Army during the American Civil War. As part of the Army of Northern Virginia it fought in the Eastern Theater until the surrender at Appomattox.

== Formation ==
The 34th North Carolina Infantry was organized at High Point, North Carolina, on October 26, 1861. In March 1862, the regiment was reorganized at Goldsboro, under the Confederate Conscription Act; the men enlisting for "three years or the duration of the war."

== Organization ==
- Company A — Ashe County, Captain, S. N. Wilson.
- Company B — Rutherford County, Cleveland County, Captain John Edwards.
- Company C — Rutherford County, Captain M. 0. Dickerson.
- Company D — Rowan County, Captain William A. Houk.
- Company E — Lincoln County, Captain John F. Hill.
- Company F — Cleveland County, Captain, Abram G. Walters.
- Company G — Mecklenburg County, Captain William R. Myers.
- Company H — Cleveland County, Captain Samuel A. Hoey.
- Company I — Rutherford County, Captain James 0. Simmons.
- Company K — Montgomery County, Captain David R. Cochran.

== Operations ==
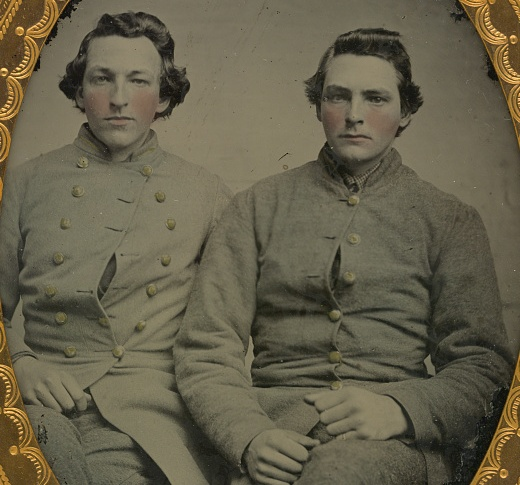
Brothers Abel and Marcus Gantt both died while serving in Company F, 34th North Carolina Infantry.

The 34th North Carolina Infantry spent the winter of 1861/62 drilling at High Point and Raleigh. Many men suffered the childhood diseases they had been spared as youths. Come spring, the regiment was transferred to Fort Branch, near Hamilton, on duty against Union gunboats on the Roanoke River. At the beginning of the summer of 1862, it was transferred to Pender's Brigade, A. P. Hill's Light Division, Army of Northern Virginia. The regiment was soon engaged in the Seven Days Battles, fighting in the battles of Mechanicsville, Gaines's Mill, and Frayser's Farm. Although not directly engaged at Malvern Hill, it came under heavy artillery fire for several hours.

In August 1862, the Light Division was transferred to Stonewall Jackson's command; the 34th North Carolina participating in the battles of Cedar Mountain, Second Manassas, Ox Hill, Harpers Ferry. After the last battle, the regiment was in charge of the pontoon bridge, and participated in the paroling of the large number of prisoners of war. After a speedy march, it reached Sharpsburg, Maryland in time to participate in the battle. During the withdrawal to Virginia, the regiment participated in the defeat of the pursuing Union army at the battle of Shepherdstown. After Shepherdstown, the 34th North Carolina could enjoy quite a long period of rest, until engaged at the battle of Fredericksburg in the middle of December.

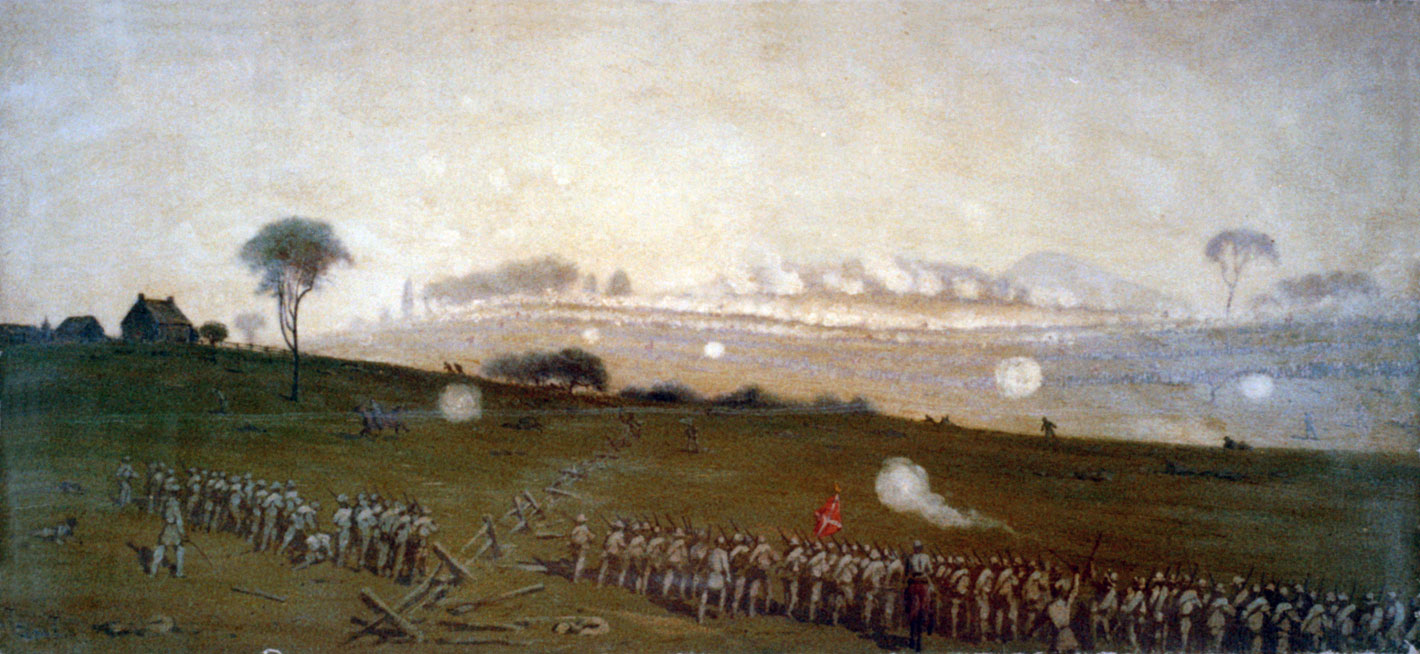
Pickett's charge.

The winter of 1862/63 was spent in winter quarters at Moss Neck. The winter was severe, the supply faltering, the provisions low, yet the morale of the regiment remained high. During the battle of Chancellorsville, it participated in the flanking movement of Stonewall Jackson's command. The regiment then returned to Moss Neck, where it remained until the army in early June broke camp for the Gettysburg campaign. At the battle of Gettysburg, the 34th Regiment suffered heavily, both during the first and during the third day. The total loss of the 34th North Carolina Infantry at Gettysburg was 104 of its 311 men. General Pender had been promoted to command the Light Division, so the regiment fought under General Scales as brigade commander. He was wounded during the battle, and the brigade command was taken over by Colonel Lowrance of the 34th North Carolina. During the retreat to Virginia, the regiment fought at the Battle of Williamsport; many men were captured by the pontoon bridge.

The 34th North Carolina was present at the battle of Bristoe Station, but it was not actively engaged. It fought at the battle of Mine Run, enduring the cold weather with great pain. The regiment spent the winter of 1863/64 at Orange Court House, where they received new recruits. They were mostly between 40 and 45 years of age, and not very able or willing soldiers. Soldiers kept deserting, no doubt because of the lack of supplies. Come spring, and the campaign season, the regiment fought at the battles of the Wilderness; Spotsylvania Court House, where its losses were few, fighting as they did behind breastworks; Hanover Junction, where it suffered heavy casualties, losing three color bearers. At the battle of Cold Harbor it was not actively engaged, but came under rapid Union fire for a long time. During the siege of Petersburg, the 34th North Carolina fought at the battle of Jerusalem Plank Road, later participating in the first assault wave at Ream's Station, being repulsed with heavy casualties.

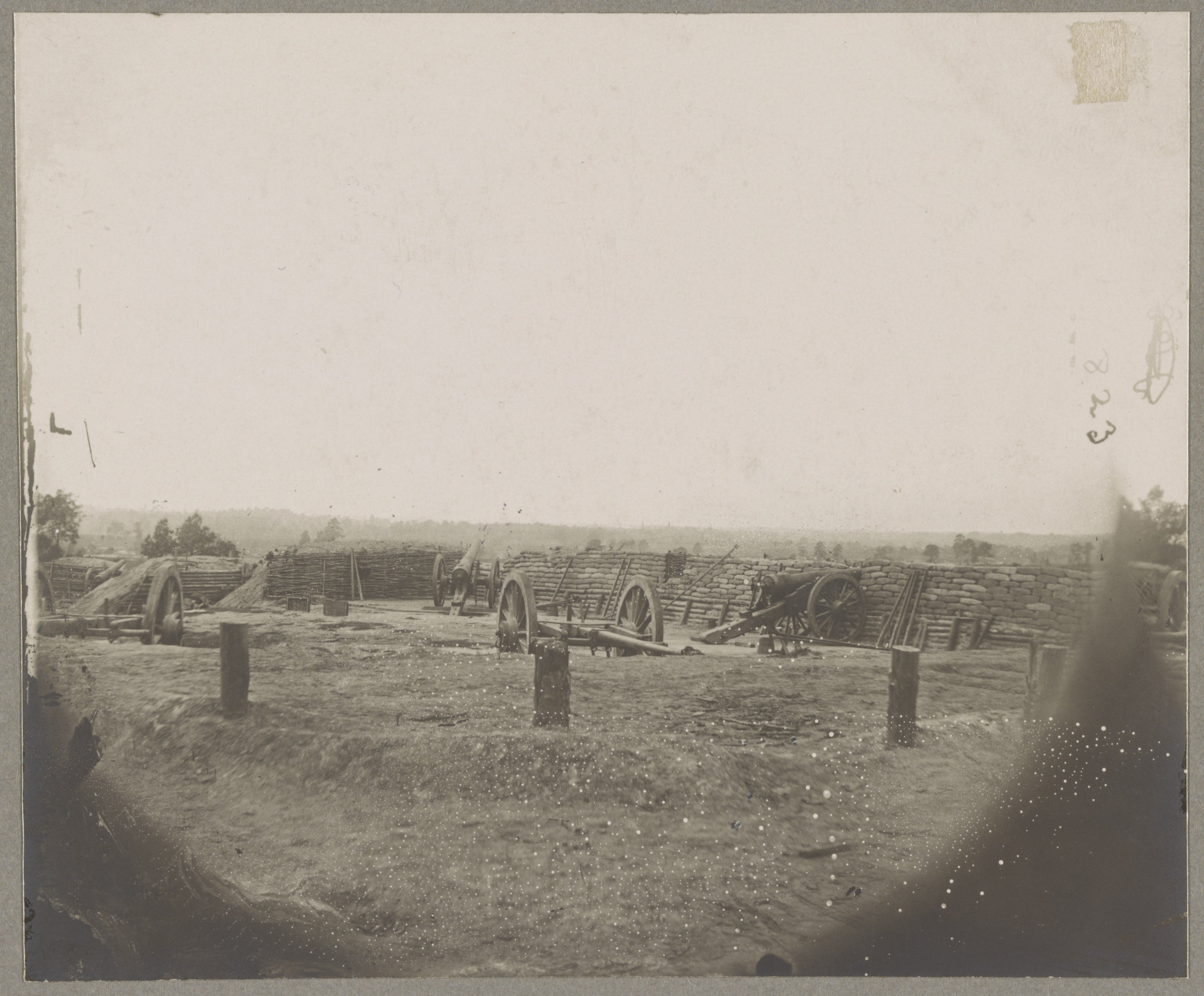
A battery in the Confederate lines at Petersburg.

During the winter of 1864/65, the 34th North Carolina was in winter quarters at Battery No. 45, near Petersburg. This was a winter of great afflictions; lack of food and clothing made many men desert to the Union lines. On April 1, the regiment learned that the Confederate lines at Petersburg had been broken. A last desperate fight was fought at Sutherland's Station, inflicting severe losses on the Union attackers. Falling back the regiment reached Amelia Court House, joining the main army, and being provisioned. On the morning of April 9, the 34th North Carolina moved into line, where they were ordered to cease fire.

== Disbandment ==
The regiment surrendered at Appomattox Court House, April 9, 1865, and the officers and men were paroled and let free to return home to North Carolina.

== See also ==
- List of North Carolina Confederate Civil War units
