= Richard H. Golden =

American politician (1850–1934)

10th Mayor of South Norwalk, Connecticut
- In office 1884–1884
- Preceded by: Peter L. Cunningham
- Succeeded by: Nelson Taylor Jr.

Personal details
- Born: 1850 Long Island, New York
- Died: 1934
- Resting place: Union Cemetery; Norwalk, Connecticut
- Party: Democratic
- Spouse: Josephine A. Newcomb (m. December 6, 1888)
- Occupation: Newspaper editor, real estate broker, financier, insurer

Richard H. Golden (1850–1934) was a one-term Democratic mayor of South Norwalk, Connecticut in 1884.

He was the son of John F. Golden and Susan Golden. He was a drummer boy during the Civil War.

He was a real estate broker in South Norwalk in 1885. He founded the Norwalk Building and Loan Association in 1889. He co-founded the South Norwalk Trust Company. He was president in the 1930s before it was merged with City Trust in the 1960s. He was an editor and proprietor of the Daily Sentinel.

He founded Taylor and Golden in 1920 along with Nelson Taylor Jr. Taylor and Golden was purchased by Schoff Darby in 1982.

Preceded by Peter L. Cunningham	Mayor of South Norwalk, Connecticut; 1884	Succeeded by Nelson Taylor Jr.
