= Nelson Taylor Jr. =

American politician

11th Mayor of South Norwalk, Connecticut
- In office 1885–1885
- Preceded by: Richard H. Golden
- Succeeded by: John L. Richards

Member of the Connecticut Senate from the 13th district
- Succeeded by: Lyman S. Catlin

Personal details
- Born: 1854
- Died: 1912 (aged 57–58)
- Resting place: Riverside Cemetery; Norwalk, Connecticut
- Education: Harvard University
- Occupation: lawyer

Military service
- Branch/service: Connecticut National Guard
- Rank: Captain
- Unit: 4th Regiment

Nelson Taylor Jr. (1854–1912) was a one-term mayor of South Norwalk, Connecticut in 1885. He was a member of the Connecticut Senate from the 13th district until 1888.

He was the son of Nelson Taylor (1821–1894) and Mary Ann Taylor (1823–1908). He was admitted to the bar in 1878. In 1879, he was a State Attorney.

He was mayor of South Norwalk in 1885. In 1888, he vacated the Connecticut Senate seat.

Preceded by	Member of the Connecticut Senate from the 13th district –1888	Succeeded by Lyman S. Catlin
Preceded by Richard H. Golden	Mayor of South Norwalk, Connecticut; 1885–1885	Succeeded by John L. Richards
