= William Lee J. Lowrance =

American Civil War regiment commander (1836–1916)

William Lee Joshua Lowrance (July 26, 1836 – March 24, 1916) commanded a North Carolina regiment in the American Civil War. At the Battle of Gettysburg he briefly led the brigade of the wounded Alfred M. Scales.

== Biography ==
Lowrance was born on July 26, 1836, in Mooresville, North Carolina, the son of John Nichols Lowrance and Jane Kilpatrick. He attended Davidson College.

Lowrance became a lieutenant in D company of the 34th North Carolina Infantry in September 1861, eventually rising to colonel by December 1862. He led the regiment in the brigade of Brigadier General William Dorsey Pender, part of Major General A. P. Hill's Light Division at the Battle of Fredericksburg and possibly at the Battle of Chancellorsville. After Chancellorsville, Pender became division commander, and Brigadier General Alfred M. Scales took command of the brigade. At Gettysburg, Lowrance was wounded on the first day of fighting, but he later took command of the brigade in place of Scales, who had been severely wounded. Lowrance found the brigade sadly depleted, but he led it in Pickett's Charge on July 3, 1863. According to his report, the brigade and that of Brigadier General James H. Lane numbered no more than 800 troops. They advanced following the division led by Brigadier General J. Johnston Pettigrew, but they retreated upon finding themselves nearly alone in front of the federal line on Cemetery Ridge.

Col. Lowrance returned to his regiment when Gen. Scales rejoined the Army of Northern Virginia. Lowrance led the regiment in the Bristoe Campaign and the Mine Run Campaign. He fought in the Battle of the Wilderness and subsequent actions, including the earlier stages of the Siege of Petersburg. Col. Lowrance led the brigade briefly when Scales was ill in late May 1864, including at the Battle of North Anna. He led the brigade again when Scales was absent ill in November 1864.

Col. Lowrance went on sick leave on February 2, 1865, and did not return to the Army.

After the War, Lowrance was a merchant in Oxford, Mississippi, and served in that state's legislature. In 1880, he moved to Texas and became a minister. He was the pastor of Oak Cliff Presbyterian Church in Dallas, Texas. Lowrance died in Forestville, Texas, on March 24, 1916. He married Sarah C. Stewart in Atlanta, Georgia. They had four sons and two daughters.
