= Carl Jacob Hammarsköld =

Member of the Swedish Hammarskjöld family

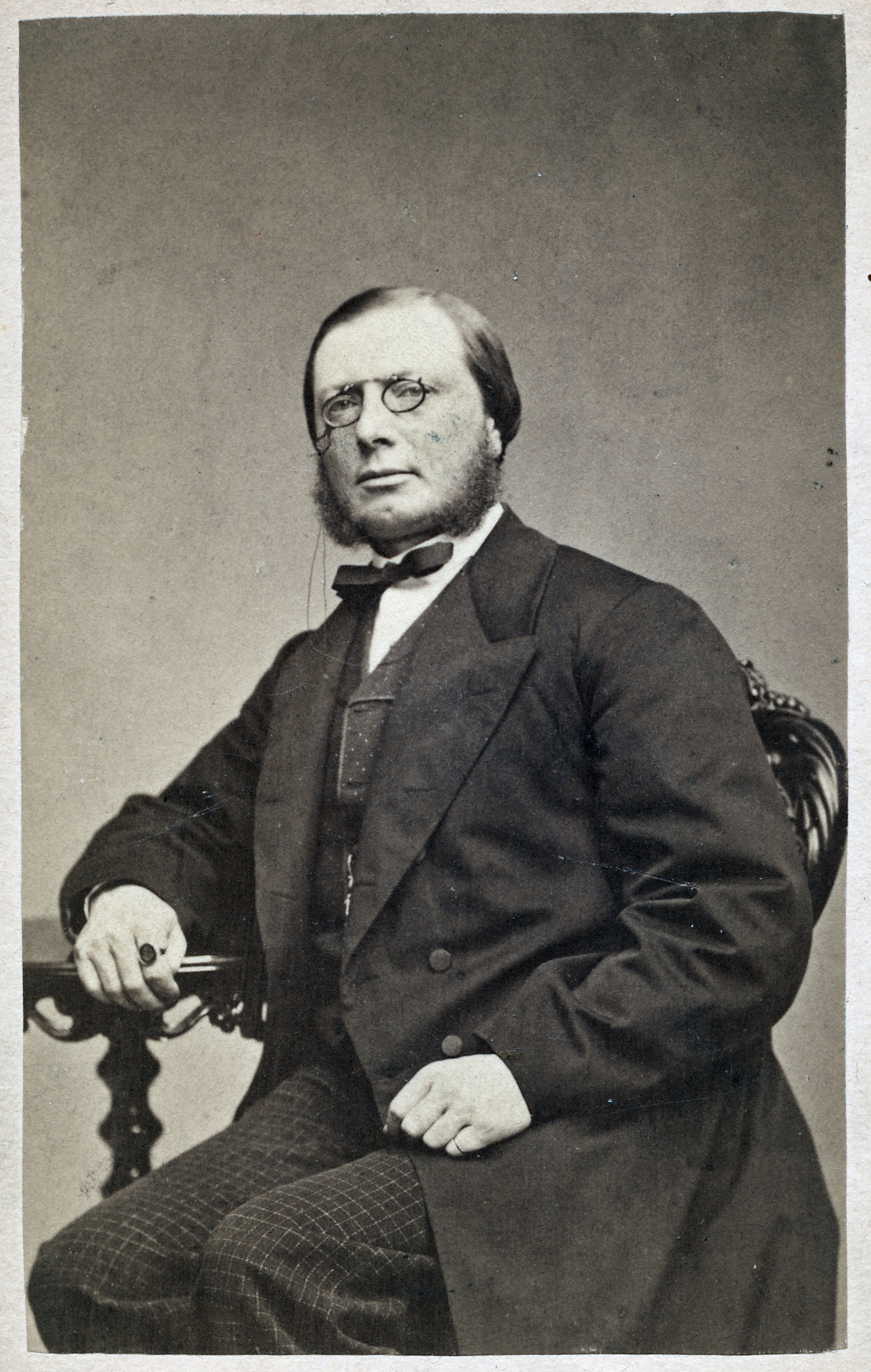
- Born: June 2, 1833; Skultuna, Sweden
- Died: February 25, 1884 (aged 50)
- Burial place: Uppsala old cemetery, Uppsala, Sweden
- Other names: Charles J. Hammarskold; Charles J. Hammerskold
- Occupations: Ironmaster; U.S. Postmaster; Confederate officer Railwayman
- Years active: 1853–1860; 1857–1861; 1861–1862; 1863–1884
- Employer(s): United States Post Office Department; Confederate States Army; Swedish State Railways
- Spouse(s): Agnes Margareta Dorotea, nee Hellman, 1870
- Awards: Knight 4th Class, Prussian Order of the Red Eagle, 1873; Knight, Royal Order of Vasa, 1874; Princely Order of Merit of Waldeck-Pyrmont, 2nd Class, 1875
- Military career
- Allegiance: Confederate States of America
- Branch: Confederate States Army
- Service years: 1861–1862
- Rank: Lieutenant Colonel
- Unit: 34th North Carolina Infantry
- Conflicts: American Civil War: Battle of Mechanicsville; Battle of Gaines's Mill; Battle of Frayser's Farm

Carl Jacob Hammarsköld (1833–1884), also known as Charles J. Hammarskold, was a member of the prominent Hammarskjöld family, who in 1850 followed his father to the United States. He became an ironmaster and U.S. Postmaster in North Carolina. When the American Civil War began, he was commissioned in the Confederate States Army, resigning as lieutenant colonel after the Seven Days Battles. Hammarsköld returned to his old homeland in 1863, where he made a successful, albeit short, career as a railwayman, dying at the age of 50.

== North Carolina ==
Carl Jacob Hammarsköld passed the studentexamen at Uppsala University in 1849, the same year his father Carl Wilhelm Carl Jacob Hammarsköld departed in all haste to the United States. The father had been manager and part owner of Skultuna mässingsbruk, but had overextended his liquidity in commodities speculations. Facing insolvency, he eluded his creditors by leaving with a large sum of money for South Carolina, where he had a cousin. There he became manager of the Coopersville Iron Works. A year later, Carl Jacob together with his mother, sister, and his mother's female companion, travelled from Stockholm to Savannah, Georgia in order to reunite with the father.

By now, the Coopersville Ironworks had been taken over by a new company with Hammarsköld senior as president. Skilled workers had been recruited in Sweden, and travelled over the Atlantic with the same ship as Carl Jacob. They all journeyed together, but after the arrival at Coopersville, the workers refused to accept the terms of employment and dispersed to other places in seek of a better future. This created a rupture between the president and the company, and the Hammarsköld family had to leave Coopersville, and move to North Carolina.

In North Carolina, the elder Hammarsköld bought the Spring Hill Forge in Lincoln County. It was an ironworks of the bloomery type, built at the beginning of the 19th century, and rebuilt after the purchase. It had three fires and two hammers, and made about 100 tons of bar iron per year. Carl Jacob Hammarsköld began his American life as a common workman at his father's forge, but soon advanced to company clerk and in 1853 to manager and part owner. He also ran a general store in Morgantown, and was U.S. Postmaster from 1857. He briefly visited Sweden in 1860, when he accompanied his sister who was sent to a music conservatory in the old homeland. After his father's death in 1860, he sold the company, after first having put up for sale some of its chattels, such as 15 mules and "Seven Likely Negroes".

== American Civil War ==
By now, "Hammarsköld had, with all his soul, become a Southerner." On May 10, 1861, Carl Jacob writes to Sweden from Raleigh, that he had left all that was dear to him, to participate in a war that will determine the destiny of the "glorious South," fully convinced that either win or die in the defense of "our country." Two weeks ago, he continues, he was ordered by Governor Ellis to report for active duty. Although it was difficult to leave his mother and his home, he took the first train to Raleigh. There he and three others were running the governor's military office; drilling, mustering, and parading the troops. Hammarsköld blamed the war on President Lincoln; "the wretched president".

Hammarsköld was commissioned second lieutenant, August 31, 1861. When the 34th North Carolina Infantry was organized in October 1861, he was commissioned as first lieutenant in Company E. When the regiment was reorganized in the spring of 1862, he became a major April 2, 1862, and was within a couple of weeks promoted to lieutenant colonel. The 34th North Carolina spent the winter of 1861/62 drilling at High Point and Raleigh. Come spring, the regiment was transferred to Fort Branch, near Hamilton, on duty against Union gunboats on the Roanoke River. At the beginning of the summer of 1862, it was transferred to Pender's Brigade, A. P. Hill's Light Division, Army of Northern Virginia. The regiment was soon engaged in the Seven Days Battles, fighting in the battles of Mechanicsville, Gaines's Mill, and Frayser's Farm.

Hammarsköld left the Confederate army after the Seven Days Battles. His business and his mother's and sister's concern made it necessary for him to go home to North Carolina, and an eye disease gave him reason to tender his resignation. He wrote to a relative in Sweden, explaining his decision, saying that he happened to come to a regiment where he had but few acquaintances, yet rose to become lieutenant colonel, and commanding four regiments as the generals and colonels became casualties. He did enjoy the military service, although being without dry clothes, or mess gear, for weeks on, or being in the middle of a battle with bullets flying and people falling every minute, was not a pleasure. However, military life had something that revived the soul, he insisted; "the concept of honor or death is satisfying."

== Railwayman in Sweden ==
After his resignation from the Confederate Army, Hammarskold made a living as a merchant. However, in 1863, he decided to return to Sweden with his mother and sister. The family traveled through the war torn country to New York, where the Swedish minister, Carl Piper, helped them to get passage over the Atlantic. Back in his homeland, Hammarsköld was employed by the Swedish State Railways as an accountant in 1863. Within the year, he was promoted to stationmaster, and in 1866 to assistant district traffic manager. Nine years later, he became traffic manager of the Stockholm district. His mother and sister settled in Uppsala, where his sister for a while taught classes in English, before she died from an internal disease. His mother became a housekeeper to the old Archbishop Henrik Reuterdahl; when he died, she moved in with her son, who just had married. Hammarsköld died in 1884, at the age of 50, but his mother lived for another six years.
