= Thomas Horan (Medal of Honor) =

American Civil War Medal of Honor recipient

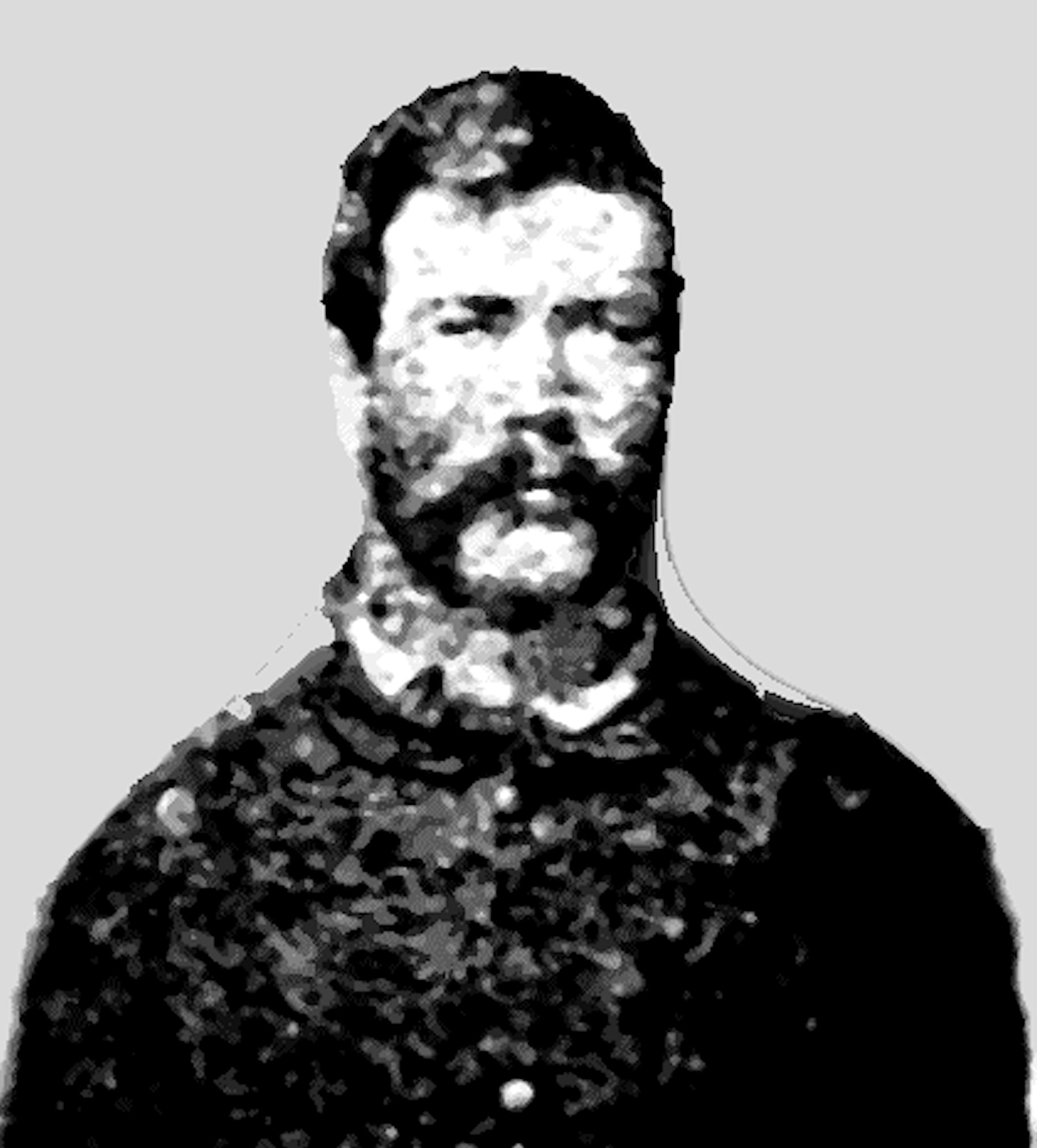
- Horan in c. 1865
- Born: c. 1839; Ireland
- Died: January 4, 1902 (aged 62–63); Madison, Illinois
- Burial place: St Mary's Cemetery, New York
- Military career
- Allegiance: United States of America
- Branch: Union Army
- Rank: Sergeant
- Units: (New York (state)) Company E, 72nd New York Volunteer Infantry Regiment
- Conflicts: American Civil War: Battle of Gettysburg
- Awards: Medal of Honor

Thomas Horan (c. 1839 – January 1, 1902) was an Irish-American soldier who fought with the Union Army in the American Civil War. Horan received his country's highest award for bravery during combat, the Medal of Honor, for actions taken on July 2, 1863, during the Battle of Gettysburg.

== Early years ==
Horan was born around 1839, the first of seven children to Michael and Mary Horan of Ireland. When Horan was around 8–10 years old, the family moved to America, likely to escape the Great Famine. They settled in Dunkirk, New York, where Thomas worked as a laborer alongside his father.

== Civil War service ==
Horan enlisted in the Union army on May 14, 1861, as a private. By November, he was promoted to corporal and again to sergeant in September 1862. In 1863, he fought at the Battle of Gettysburg, where he captured the flag of the 8th Florida Infantry. For this action, he was awarded the Medal of Honor on April 5, 1898.

Horan also fought in the Battle of the Wilderness, where he was wounded on May 7, 1864.
