= Nelson Taylor =

American politician (1821–1894)

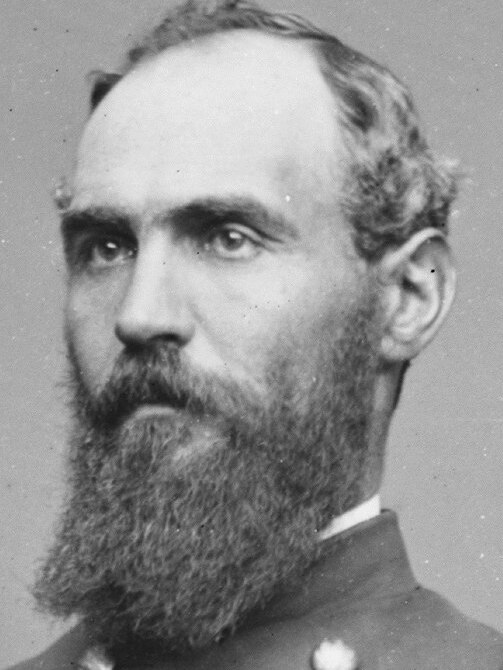

Member of the U.S. House of Representatives from New York's 5th district
- In office March 4, 1865 – March 3, 1867
- Preceded by: Fernando Wood
- Succeeded by: John Morrissey

Member of the California Senate from San Joaquin
- In office 1850–1856
- Succeeded by: William D. Fairhead

Personal details
- Born: June 8, 1821 South Norwalk, Connecticut
- Died: January 16, 1894 (aged 72) South Norwalk, Connecticut
- Resting place: Riverside Cemetery, Norwalk, Connecticut
- Party: Democratic
- Spouse: Mary Ann Taylor (1823 – 1908)
- Children: Nelson Taylor Jr. (1854 – 1912)

Military service
- Allegiance: United States of America; Union
- Branch/service: United States Army; Union Army
- Rank: Brigadier General
- Commands: 72nd New York Infantry; Excelsior Brigade
- Battles/wars: Mexican–American War; American Civil War

Nelson Taylor (June 8, 1821 – January 16, 1894) was an American lawyer who served as a U.S. representative from New York, a brigadier-general in the Union Army during the American Civil War, and a captain in the U.S. Army during the Mexican–American War.

== Biography ==
Born in South Norwalk, Connecticut, Taylor attended the common schools, an early precursor to the public education system.

== Mexican-American War ==
He enlisted for the Mexican–American War as a captain in the 1st New York Infantry Regiment, August 1, 1846, and was sent to California in 1846 just before the outbreak of the war.

=== California Senate ===
He was honorably mustered out on September 18, 1848. He remained in California and engaged in business at Stockton. He briefly served as a member of the first inaugural California Senate from San Joaquin from December 15, 1849, to February 13, 1850. He won a seat in the California Senate with 16.6% of the vote. While serving, he voted for the expansion of the California government and advocated for a transcontinental railroad that would connect California to the East Coast.

He was expelled from the California Senate on February 13, 1850, due to an excessive absence while attending to business concerns in New York City. He was expelled “without any reflection upon his character.”

Upon returning to California, he served as the president of the board of trustees for the State Insane Asylum from 1850 to 1856. Taylor was elected sheriff of San Joaquin County in 1855. Nelson resigned his positions in 1856 and moved back to New York City after having made many political connections in California.

=== Move to New York City ===
He moved to New York City in 1856, then attended Harvard University. He graduated from Harvard Law School in 1860. He was admitted to the bar and practiced law in New York City. He was an unsuccessful Democratic candidate for election in 1860 to the 37th Congress. He lost the election to Republican William Wall.

== Civil War ==
Taylor was commissioned colonel of the 72nd New York Volunteer Infantry Regiment, July 23, 1861. In March 1862, he replaced the infamous Danial Sickles as commander of the division. Sickles was a favorite of Lincoln and Joseph Hooker, though he was hardly liked in Congress. As commander of the Excelsior Brigade he saw action at the Battle of Williamsburg and Second Bull Run. He fought with the Army of the Potomac until September 1862, when he was promoted to Brigadier General at the recommendation of General McClellan. Taylor was transferred to the First Army Corps to replace Brigadier General George Hartsuff, who was injured in the Battle of Antietam.

Taylor commanded the Third Brigade of the First Army Corps during the Battle of Fredericksburg, where “he distinguished himself for his bravery and coolness during action.” At the start of the battle, he assisted in capturing the bridge at Rappahannock Station, an important crossing point for the Union Army. Taylor was given command of the front-line troops of General John Gibbon’s division during the initial assault on Confederate lines due to Taylor's “iron discipline” with his troops. Taylor's advance against General James Henry Lane, who held Stonewall Jackson's left, was repulsed. Taylor rallied his men long enough for support to arrive from General Lane in his rear. During the fighting, General Gibbon was injured, and Taylor took command of the division, where he promptly advanced reserves on the Confederate lines to reinforce the collapsing middle of the line. At one point, his troops begged him to retreat as they were out of ammunition, to which he replied, “Use the bayonet.” The position that Taylor had reinforced held for a period of time, until a Confederate line emerged from the nearby woods and he was forced to retreat. This retreat forced Taylor to surrender control of the RF&P Railroad which was vital to both sides. The collapse of the center of the Union Army's line ensured that the town would not be taken. Nelson's troops suffered heavy losses during the battle due to inferior firepower and being in an inferior position on the battlefield. Though he suffered defeat and was forced to retreat, Taylor's actions in the battle earned him high praise from both his troops and superiors.

Taylor resigned his commission on January 19, 1863. This is likely due to the events of the Mud March led by General Burnside. Taylor returned to New York City, where he reopened his law practice in the city.

== House of Representatives ==
Taylor was elected as a Democrat to the 39th Congress (March 4, 1865 – March 3, 1867). He defeated the Republican William B. McCay with 51% of the vote. Taylor replaced ex-Tammany Hall leader Fernando Wood, who was a key member of the Copperhead Democrats. Taylor was firmly seen as a War Democrat.

During his time in the House of Representatives, Taylor served on the Select Committee on Freedmen and voted on many bills related to Reconstruction. He was a staunch opponent of the Freedmen's Bureau and voted for it not to be continued in 1866. Taylor believed that the Freedmen's Bureau went beyond protecting the rights of African-Americans in the South and that the law would "overleap the mark... and before we are aware of it, not have the freedmen equal before the law, but superior.” Specifically he was opposed to the expansion of the Freedmen's Bureau throughout the United States, and claimed that reports from General Grant had never asked for an increase in the powers of the bureau. Though he often voted to protect the rights of African-Americans, Taylor was opposed to financial assistance to the South in any form. Taylor supported the President's plan to reincorporate the Southern States into the Union. He voted in favor of allowing elected members from designated districts in Arkansas to rejoin the House of Representatives, provided they had not participated in the government of the Confederacy.

Taylor was a strong supporter of expanding federal infrastructure into the West and supported federal aid to Native Americans who had been displaced due to the westward expansion. He often voted to raise the salary of soldiers in the army and voted in favor of back-payments to militia and irregular soldiers who had participated in the earlier phases of the war.

Taylor was an unsuccessful candidate for reelection in 1866 to the Fortieth Congress. Taylor lost his reelection campaign to John Morrissey, an infamous bare-knuckle boxer, in 1866. Morrissey had the financial backing of Tammany Hall, which Taylor could not compete with.

== Later life ==
Taylor moved to South Norwalk, Connecticut in 1869 and continued the practice of law. He served several times as the city attorney. He died in South Norwalk, Connecticut, on January 16, 1894. He was interred in Riverside Cemetery.

He was the father of Nelson Taylor Jr., the mayor of South Norwalk, Connecticut, in 1885, and Connecticut State Senator until 1888. In 1888, Taylor helped found the Lockwood Manufacturing Hardware Company with Henry S. Lockwood. Taylor was President of the company, focusing on builder's hardware, until his death in 1894.

== See also ==
- List of American Civil War generals (Union)

U.S. House of Representatives
Preceded by Fernando Wood	Member of the U.S. House of Representatives from New York's 5th congressional district 1865–1867	Succeeded by John Morrissey
