= Thomas Horan (cricketer, born 1886) =

Australian cricketer

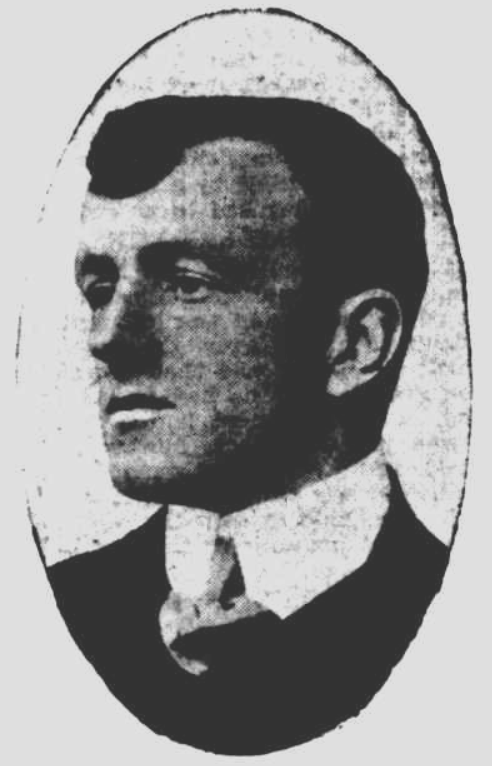

Personal information
- Born: 7 April 1886; Melbourne, Australia
- Died: 26 May 1952 (aged 66); East Camberwell, Australia

Domestic team information
- Years: Team
- 1906/07–1908/09: Victoria
- Source: Cricinfo, 15 November 2015

Thomas Horan (7 April 1886 – 26 May 1952) was an Australian cricketer. He played five first-class cricket matches for Victoria between 1906 and 1909.
