= Overland Campaign =

1864 series of battles in Virginia during the American Civil War

- Part of the American Civil War
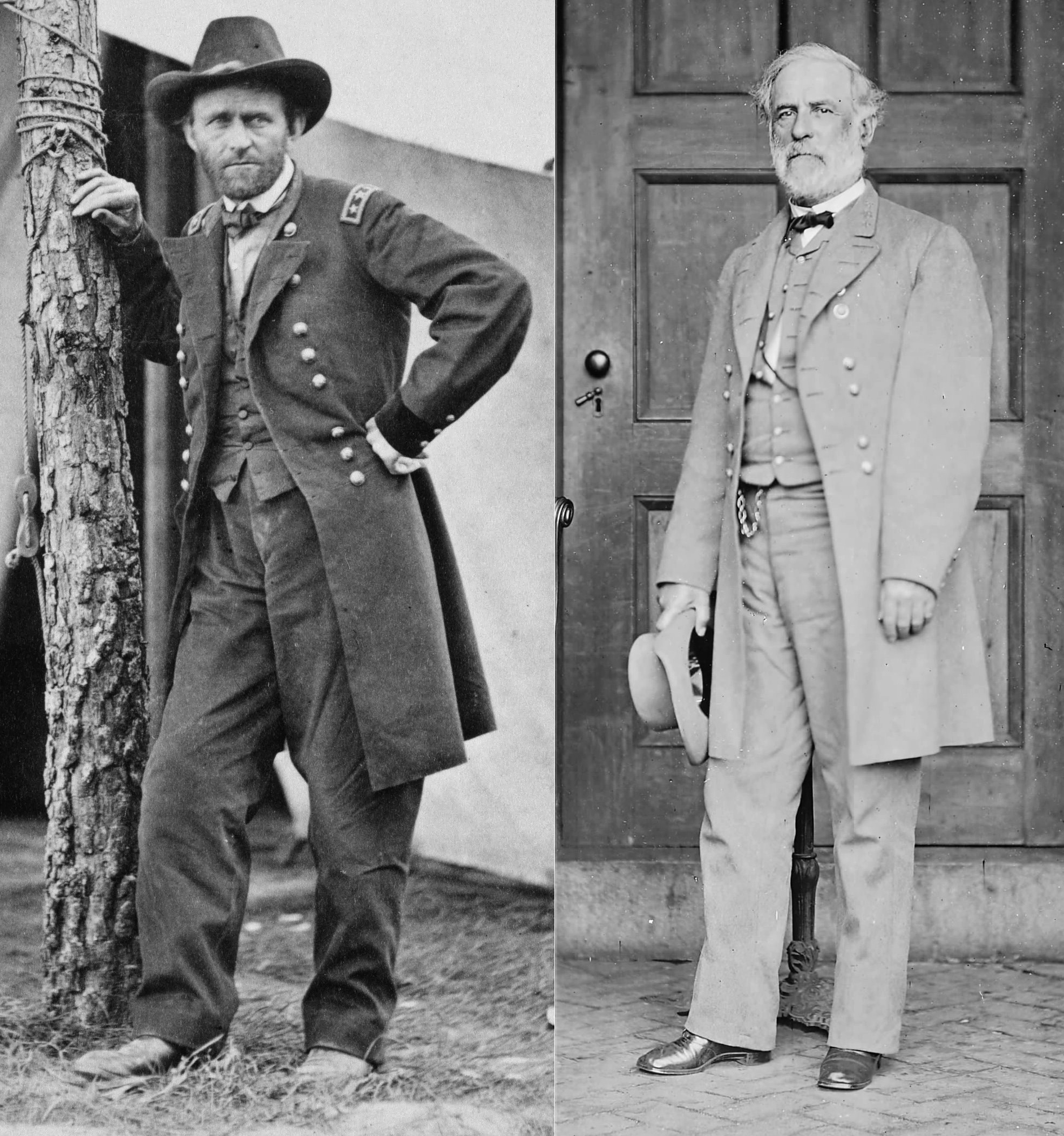
- Ulysses S. Grant and Robert E. Lee, respectively, opposing commanders in the Overland Campaign
| Date | May 4 – June 24, 1864 |
| Location | Virginia |
| Result | See § Aftermath |

Belligerents
| United States (Union) | Confederate States (Confederacy) |

Commanders and leaders
| Ulysses S. Grant; George G. Meade | Robert E. Lee |

Units involved
| Army of the Potomac; IX Corps; XVIII Corps (Army of the James) | Army of Northern Virginia |

Strength
| 103,875–124,232 ("present for duty") | 60,000–65,000 |

Casualties and losses
| 54,926 total (7,621 killed; 38,339 wounded; 8,966 captured/missing) | 30,000–35,000 (estimated); 4,206–4,352 killed; 18,564–19,130 wounded; 9,861–10,164 missing/captured |

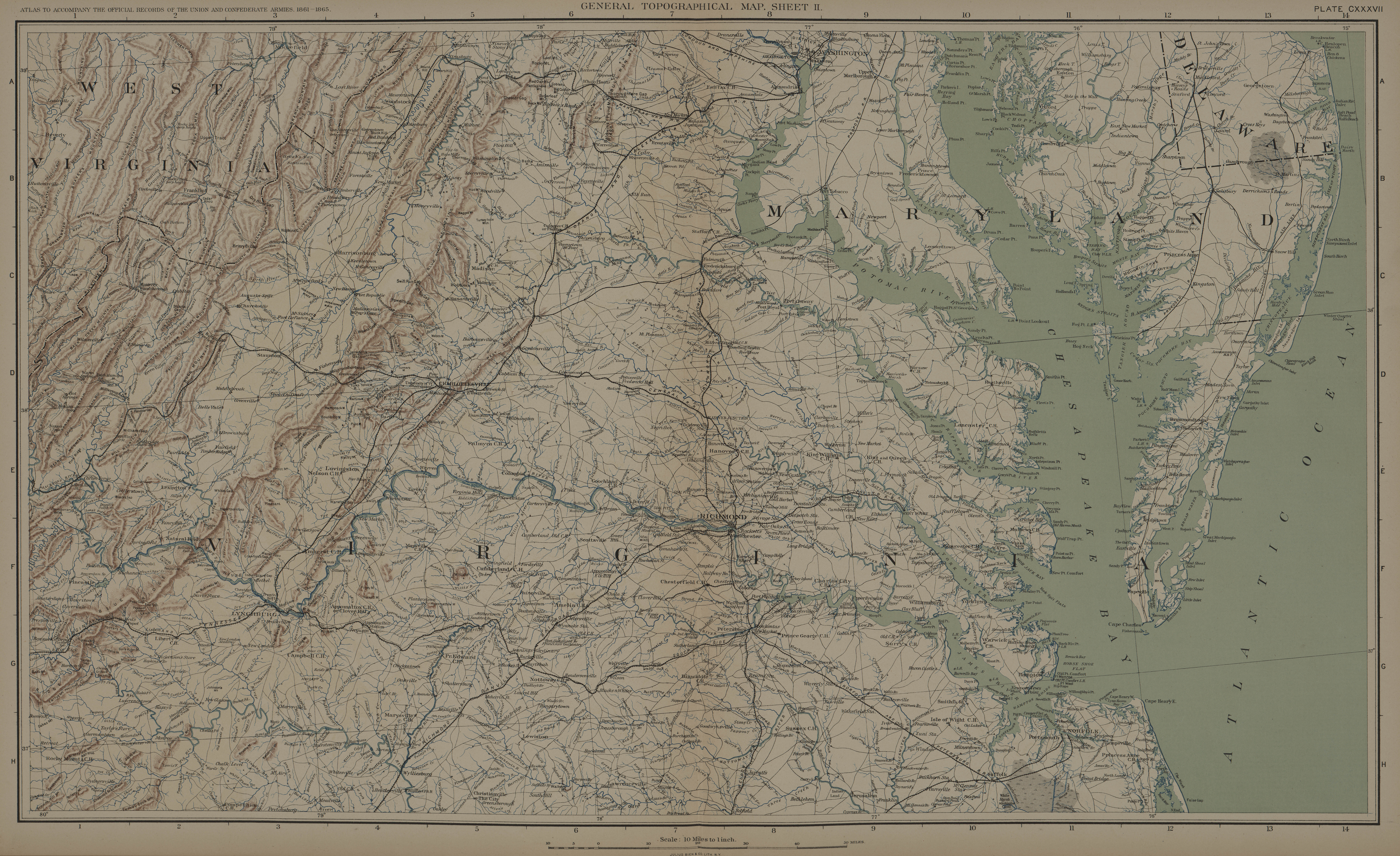
Virginia (1864)

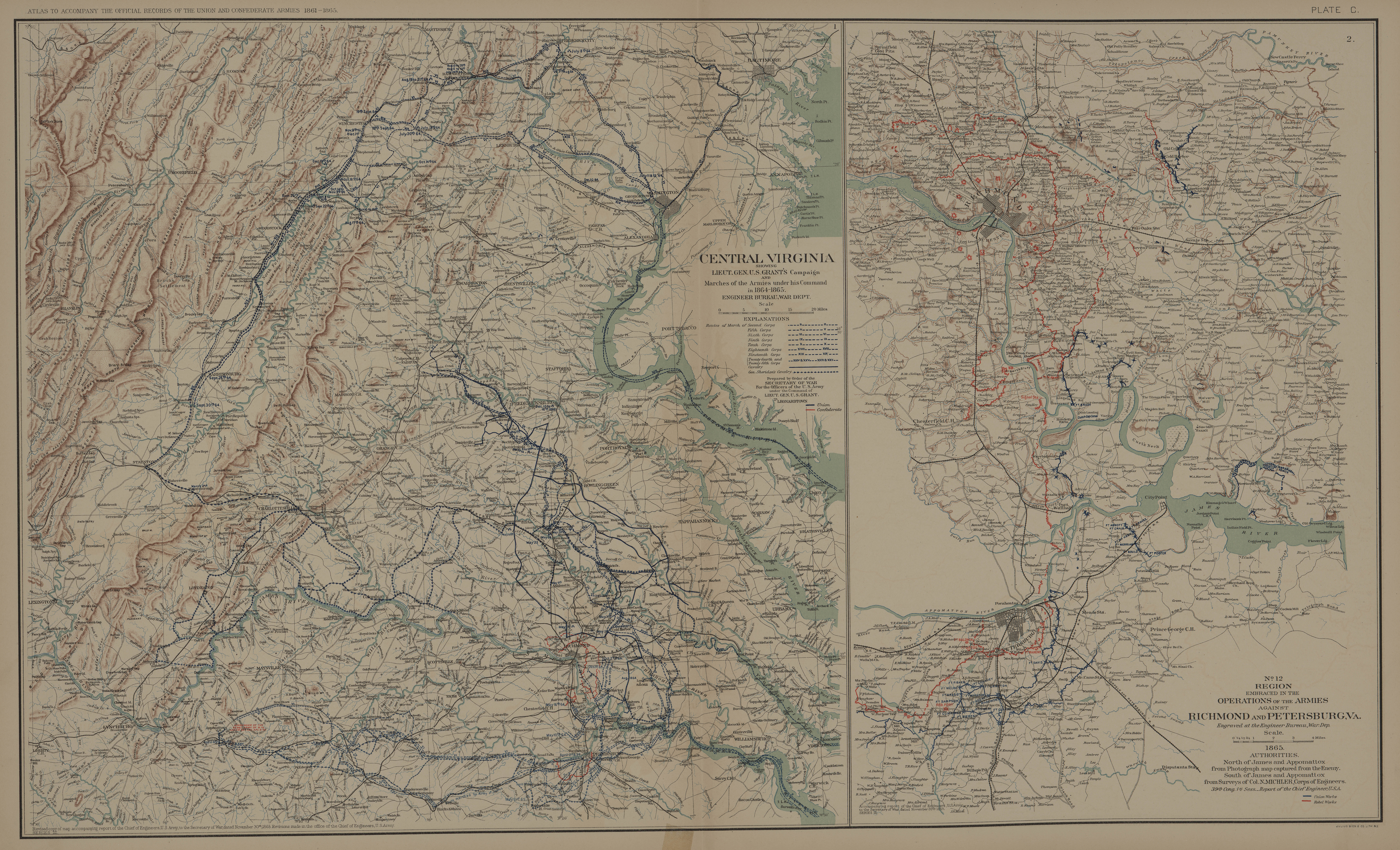
Detailed map of the Overland Campaign showing the march of the individual Union Army Corps.

The Overland Campaign, also known as Grant's Overland Campaign, the Virginia Campaign, and the Wilderness Campaign, was a series of battles fought in Virginia during May and June 1864, towards the end of the American Civil War. Lt. Gen. Ulysses S. Grant, general-in-chief of all Union armies, directed the actions of the Army of the Potomac, commanded by Maj. Gen. George G. Meade, and other forces against Confederate Gen. Robert E. Lee's Army of Northern Virginia. Although Grant suffered severe losses during the campaign, causing some to view it as inconclusive on its own, others have viewed it as a strategic Union victory. It inflicted proportionately higher losses on Lee's army and maneuvered it into a siege at Richmond and Petersburg, Virginia, in just over eight weeks.

Crossing the Rapidan River on May 4, 1864, Grant sought to defeat Lee's army by quickly placing his forces between Lee and Richmond and inviting an open battle. Lee surprised Grant by attacking the larger Union army in the Battle of the Wilderness (May 5–7), resulting in many casualties on both sides. Unlike his predecessors in the eastern theater, Grant did not withdraw his army following this setback but instead maneuvered to the southeast, resuming his attempt to interpose his forces between Lee and Richmond; Lee's army was able to get into position to block this maneuver. At the Battle of Spotsylvania Court House (May 8–21), Grant repeatedly attacked segments of the Confederate defensive line, hoping for a breakthrough but the only results were again many losses for both sides.

Grant maneuvered again, meeting Lee at the North Anna River (Battle of North Anna, May 23–26). Here, Lee held clever defensive positions to divide the Union army and attack them; however, the effectiveness of the plan is debatable. The final major battle of the campaign was waged at Cold Harbor (May 31 – June 12), in which Grant gambled that Lee's army was exhausted and ordered a massive assault against strong defensive positions, resulting in disproportionately heavy Union casualties. Resorting to maneuver a final time, Grant surprised Lee by stealthily crossing the James River, threatening to capture the city of Petersburg, the loss of which would doom the Confederate capital. The resulting siege of Petersburg (June 1864 – April 1865) then led to the eventual surrender of Lee's army in April 1865 and the end of the Civil War.

The campaign included two long-range raids by Union cavalry under Maj. Gen. Philip Sheridan. In a raid toward Richmond, Confederate cavalry commander Maj. Gen. J.E.B. Stuart was mortally wounded at the Battle of Yellow Tavern (May 11). In a raid attempting to destroy the Virginia Central Railroad to the west, Sheridan was thwarted by Maj. Gen. Wade Hampton at the Battle of Trevilian Station (June 11–12), the largest cavalry battle of the war.

== Background ==
=== Military situation ===
Overland Campaign, from the Wilderness to crossing the James River Confederate Union

In March 1864, Grant was summoned from the Western Theater, promoted to lieutenant general, and given command of all Union armies. He chose to make his headquarters with the Army of the Potomac, although Meade retained formal command of that army. Maj. Gen. William Tecumseh Sherman succeeded Grant in command of most of the western armies. Grant and President Abraham Lincoln devised a coordinated strategy that would strike at the heart of the Confederacy from multiple directions: Grant, Meade, and Benjamin Butler against Lee near Richmond, Virginia; Franz Sigel in the Shenandoah Valley; Sherman to invade Georgia, defeat Joseph E. Johnston, and capture Atlanta; George Crook and William W. Averell to operate against railroad supply lines in West Virginia; and Nathaniel Banks to capture Mobile, Alabama. This was the first time the Union armies would have a coordinated offensive strategy across a number of theaters.

Although previous Union campaigns in Virginia targeted the Confederate capital of Richmond as their primary objective, this time the goal was to capture Richmond by aiming for the destruction of Lee's army. Lincoln had long advocated this strategy for his generals, recognizing that the city would certainly fall after the loss of its principal defensive army. Grant ordered Meade, "Wherever Lee goes, there you will go also." Although he hoped for a quick, decisive battle, Grant was prepared to fight a war of attrition. He meant to "hammer continuously against the armed force of the enemy and his resources until by mere attrition, if in no other way, there should be nothing left to him but an equal submission with the loyal section of our common country to the constitution and laws of the land." Both Union and Confederate casualties could be high, but the Union had greater resources to replace lost soldiers and equipment.

== Opposing forces ==
Despite Grant's superior numbers, he had manpower challenges. Following their severe beating at the Battle of Gettysburg the previous year, the I Corps and the III Corps had been disbanded and their survivors reallocated to other corps, which damaged unit cohesion and morale. Because he was operating on the offensive in enemy territory, Grant had to defend his bases of supply and the lines extending from them to his army in the field; it was principally for this reason that Grant chose to maneuver repeatedly around Lee's right flank during the campaign, relying on waterborne supply lines instead of the railroads, such as the Orange and Alexandria, in Virginia's interior. Furthermore, since many of his soldiers' three-year enlistments were about to expire, they were naturally reluctant to participate in dangerous assaults. To deal with these challenges, Grant supplemented his forces by reassigning soldiers manning the heavy artillery batteries around Washington, D.C., to infantry regiments.

== Battles ==
=== The Wilderness (May 5–7, 1864) ===
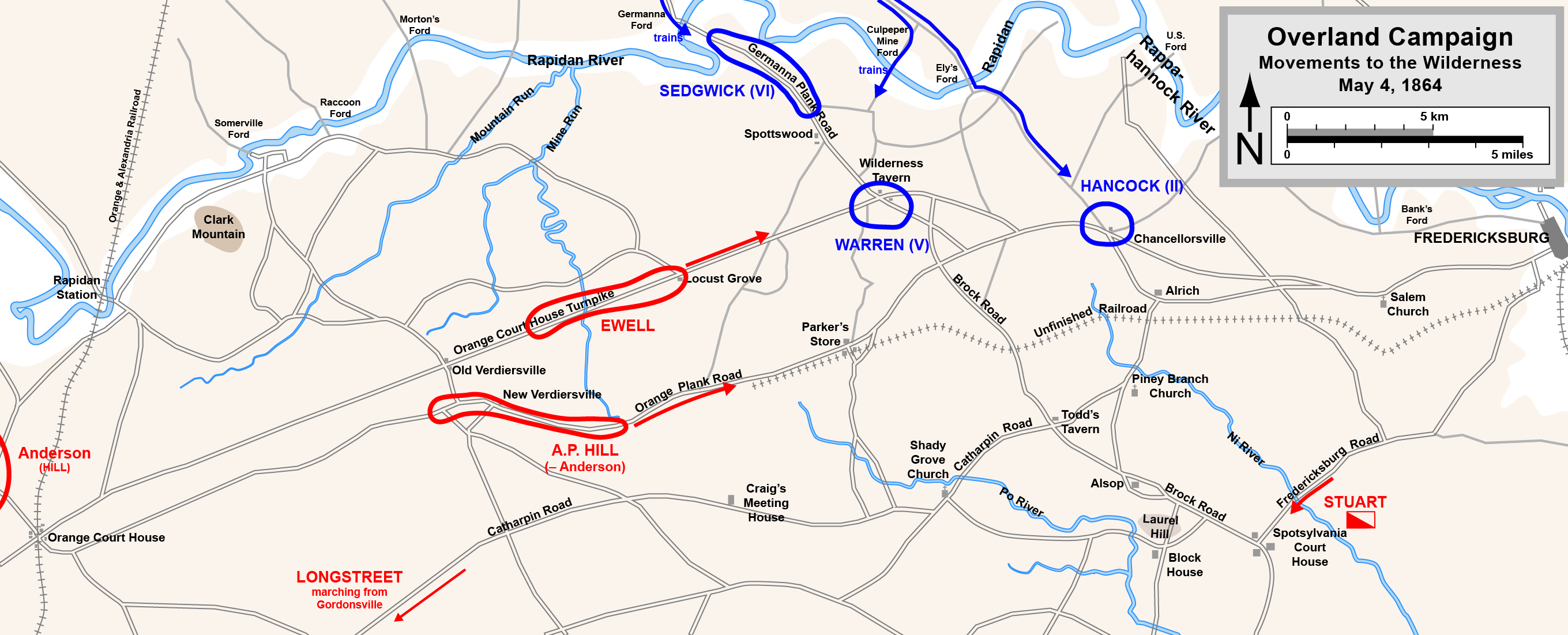
Start of the Overland Campaign, May 4, 1864: Movement into the Wilderness. Confederate Union

The Overland Campaign began as Grant's forces crossed the Rapidan River on May 4, 1864. Grant's objective was to force an engagement with Lee, outside of his Mine Run fortifications, by either drawing his forces out or turning them. Lee, displaying the audacity that characterized his generalship, moved out as Grant desired, but more quickly than Grant anticipated; Union forces had insufficient time to clear the area known as the Wilderness, a tangle of scrub brush and undergrowth in which part of the Battle of Chancellorsville had been fought the previous year. By forcing a fight here, Lee effectively neutralized the Union's advantage in artillery. He ordered Ewell's Corps to advance on the Orange Turnpike, A.P. Hill's in parallel on the Orange Plank Road, and James Longstreet's from the distant Gordonsville.

Early on May 5, Warren's V Corps was advancing south toward the Plank Road when Ewell's Corps appeared in the west on the Turnpike. Meade halted his army and directed Warren to attack if the Confederates were a small, isolated group. Ewell's men erected earthworks on the western end of the clearing known as Saunders Field. Warren requested a delay from Meade so that Sedgwick's VI Corps could be brought in on his right and extend his line. By 1 p.m., Meade was frustrated by the delay and ordered Warren to attack before Sedgwick could arrive. The brigade of Brig. Gen. Romeyn B. Ayres had to take cover in a gully to avoid enfilading fire. The brigade of Brig. Gen. Joseph J. Bartlett made better progress to Ayres's left and overran the position of Brig. Gen. John M. Jones, who was killed. However, since Ayres's men were unable to advance, Bartlett's right flank was now exposed to attack, and his brigade was forced to flee back across the clearing.

To the left of Bartlett, the Iron Brigade, commanded by Brig. Gen. Lysander Cutler, struck a brigade of Alabamians commanded by Brig. Gen. Cullen A. Battle. Although initially pushed back, the Confederates counterattacked with the brigade of Brig. Gen. John B. Gordon, tearing through the line and forcing the Iron Brigade to flee. Near the Higgerson farm, the brigades of Col. Roy Stone and Brig. Gen. James C. Rice attacked the brigades of Brig. Gen. George P. Doles's Georgians and Brig. Gen. Junius Daniel's North Carolinians. Both attacks failed under heavy fire, and Crawford ordered his men to pull back. Warren ordered an artillery section into Saunders Field to support his attack, but it was captured by Confederate soldiers, who were pinned down and prevented by rifle fire from moving the guns until darkness. In the midst of hand-to-hand combat at the guns, the field caught fire and men from both sides were shocked as their wounded comrades burned to death. The lead elements of Sedgwick's VI Corps reached Saunders Field at 3 p.m., by which time Warren's men had ceased fighting. Sedgwick attacked Ewell's line in the woods north of the Turnpike and both sides traded attacks and counterattacks that lasted about an hour before each disengaged to erect earthworks.

A.P. Hill's approach on the Plank Road that afternoon was detected, and Meade ordered the VI Corps division of Brig. Gen. George W. Getty to defend the important intersection with the Brock Road. Getty's men arrived just before Hill's and the two forces skirmished briefly, ending with Hill's men withdrawing a few hundred yards west of the intersection. Meade sent orders to Hancock directing him to move his II Corps north to come to Getty's assistance. As the Union men approached the position of Maj. Gen. Henry Heth, they were pinned down by fire from a shallow ridge to their front. As each II Corps division arrived, Hancock sent it forward to assist, bringing enough combat power to bear that Lee was forced to commit his reserves, the division commanded by Maj. Gen. Cadmus M. Wilcox. Fierce fighting continued until nightfall with neither side gaining an advantage.

On May 6, Hancock's II Corps attacked Hill at 5 a.m., overwhelming the Third Corps with the divisions of Wadsworth, Birney, and Mott; Getty and Gibbon were in support. Lee had assured Hill that Longstreet's Corps would arrive to reinforce Hill before dawn, but moving cross-country in the dark, they made slow progress and lost their way at times. Ewell's men on the Turnpike had attacked first, at 4:45 a.m., but continued to be pinned down by attacks from Sedgwick's and Warren's corps and could not be relied upon for assistance. Before a total collapse, however, reinforcements arrived at 6 a.m., Brig. Gen. John Gregg's 800-man Texas Brigade, the vanguard of Longstreet's column. General Lee, caught up in the excitement, began to move forward with the advancing brigade. As the Texans realized this, they halted, refusing to move forward unless Lee remained in the rear.

Longstreet counterattacked with the divisions of Maj. Gen. Charles W. Field and Brig. Gen. Joseph B. Kershaw. The Union troops fell a few hundred yards back from the Widow Tapp farm. At 10 a.m., Longstreet's chief engineer reported that he had explored an unfinished railroad bed south of the Plank Road and that it offered easy access to the Union left flank. Longstreet's aide, Lt. Col. Moxley Sorrel, and the senior brigade commander, Brig. Gen. William Mahone, struck at 11 a.m. with four brigades. At the same time, Longstreet resumed his main attack, driving Hancock's men back to the Brock Road, but the momentum was lost when Longstreet was wounded by his own men, putting him out of action until October.

At the Turnpike, inconclusive fighting continued for most of the day. Early in the morning, Brig. Gen. John B. Gordon scouted the Union line and recommended to his division commander, Jubal Early, that he conduct a flanking attack, but Early dismissed the venture as too risky and did not approve it until that evening. Gordon's attack made good progress against inexperienced New York troops, but eventually the darkness and the dense foliage took their toll as the Union flank received reinforcements and recovered.

On the morning of May 7, Grant chose maneuver instead of further attacks. By moving south on the Brock Road, he hoped to reach the crossroads at Spotsylvania Court House, which would interpose his army between Lee and Richmond, forcing Lee to fight on ground more advantageous to the Union army. He ordered preparations for a night march on May 7 that would reach Spotsylvania, 10 mi (16 km) to the southeast, by the morning of May 8. Unfortunately for Grant, inadequate cavalry screening allowed Lee's army to reach the crossroads before sufficient Union troops arrived to contest it.

Battle of the Wilderness

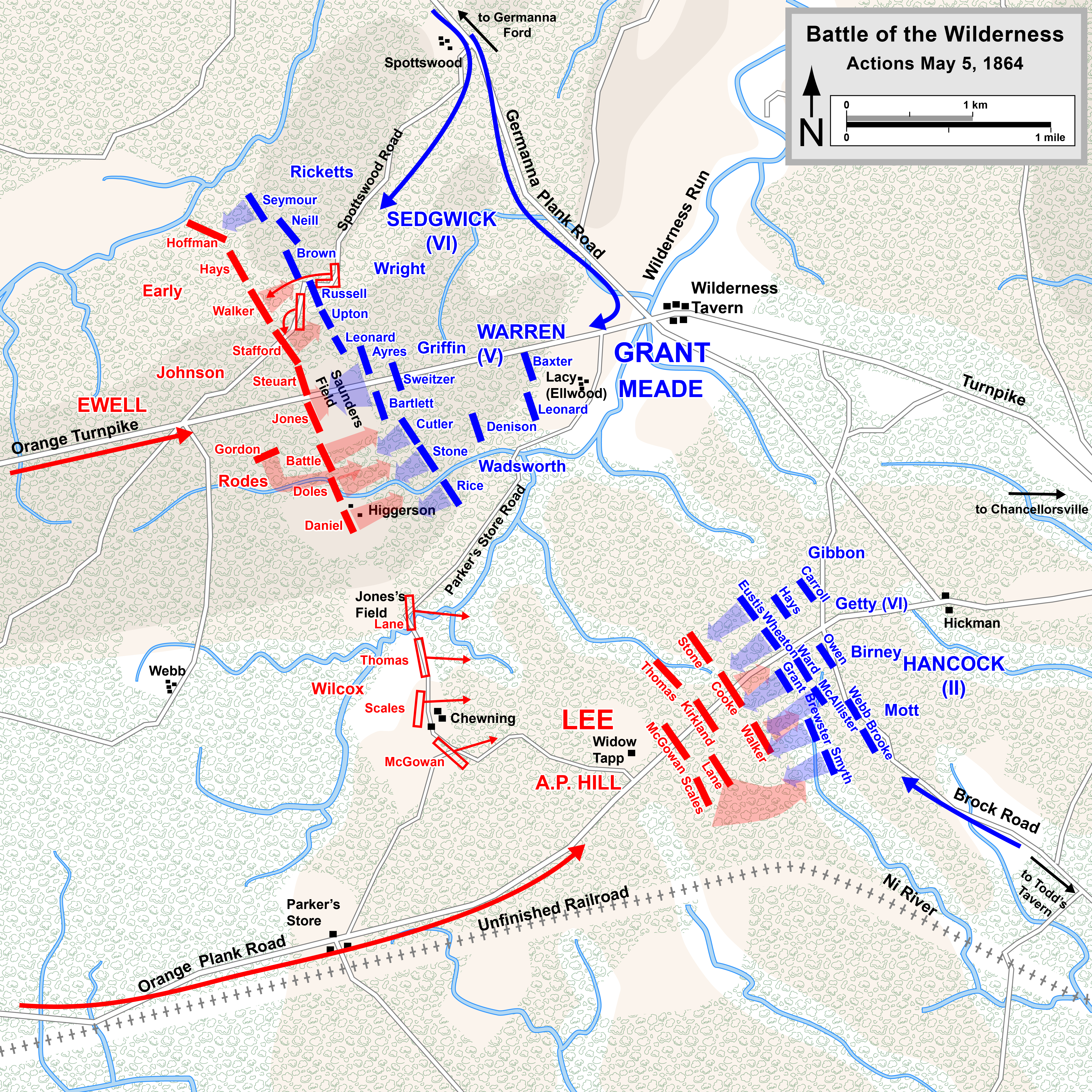
Actions in the Wilderness, May 5, 1864.

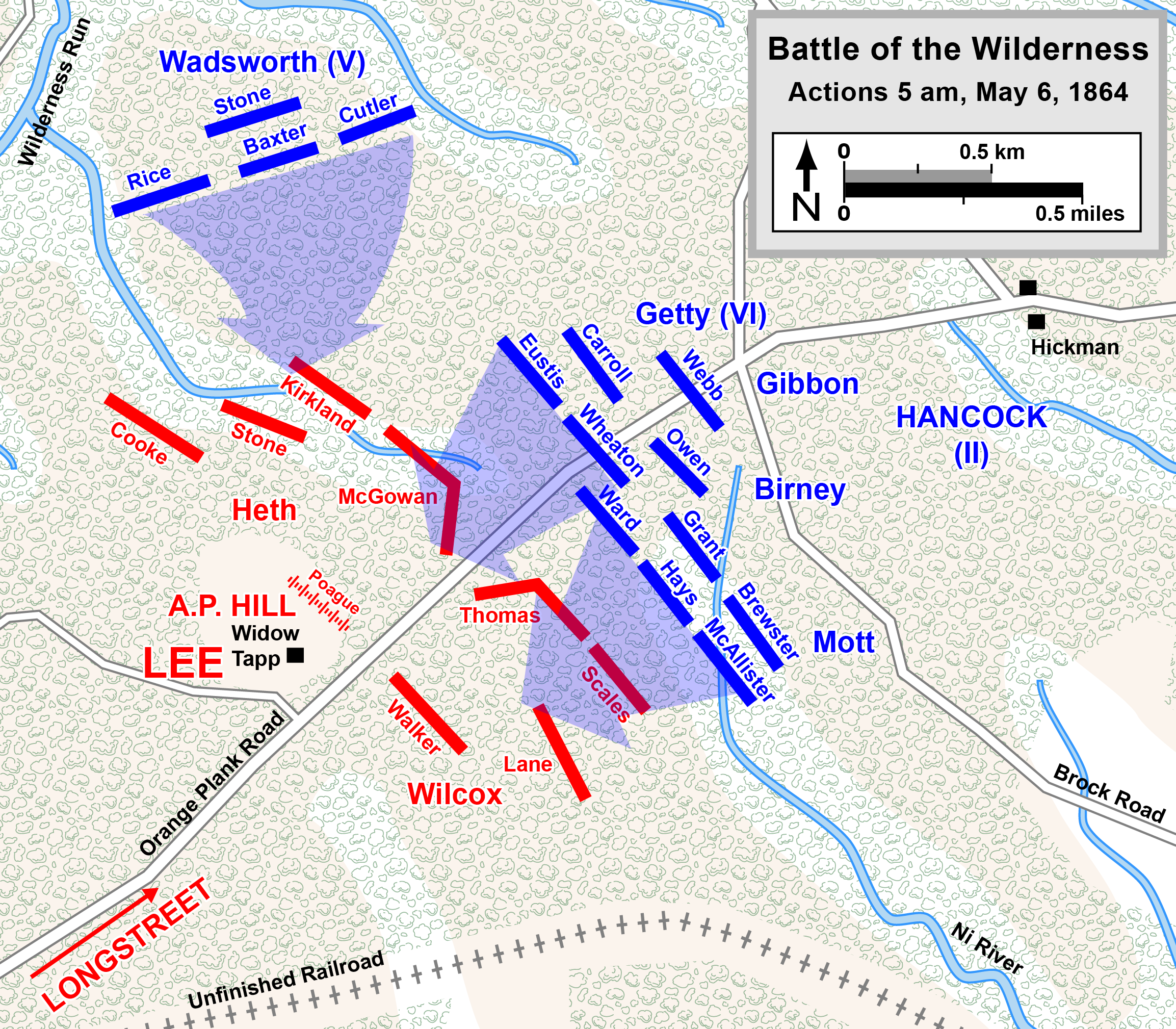
5 a.m., May 6. Hancock attacks Hill on the Plank Road

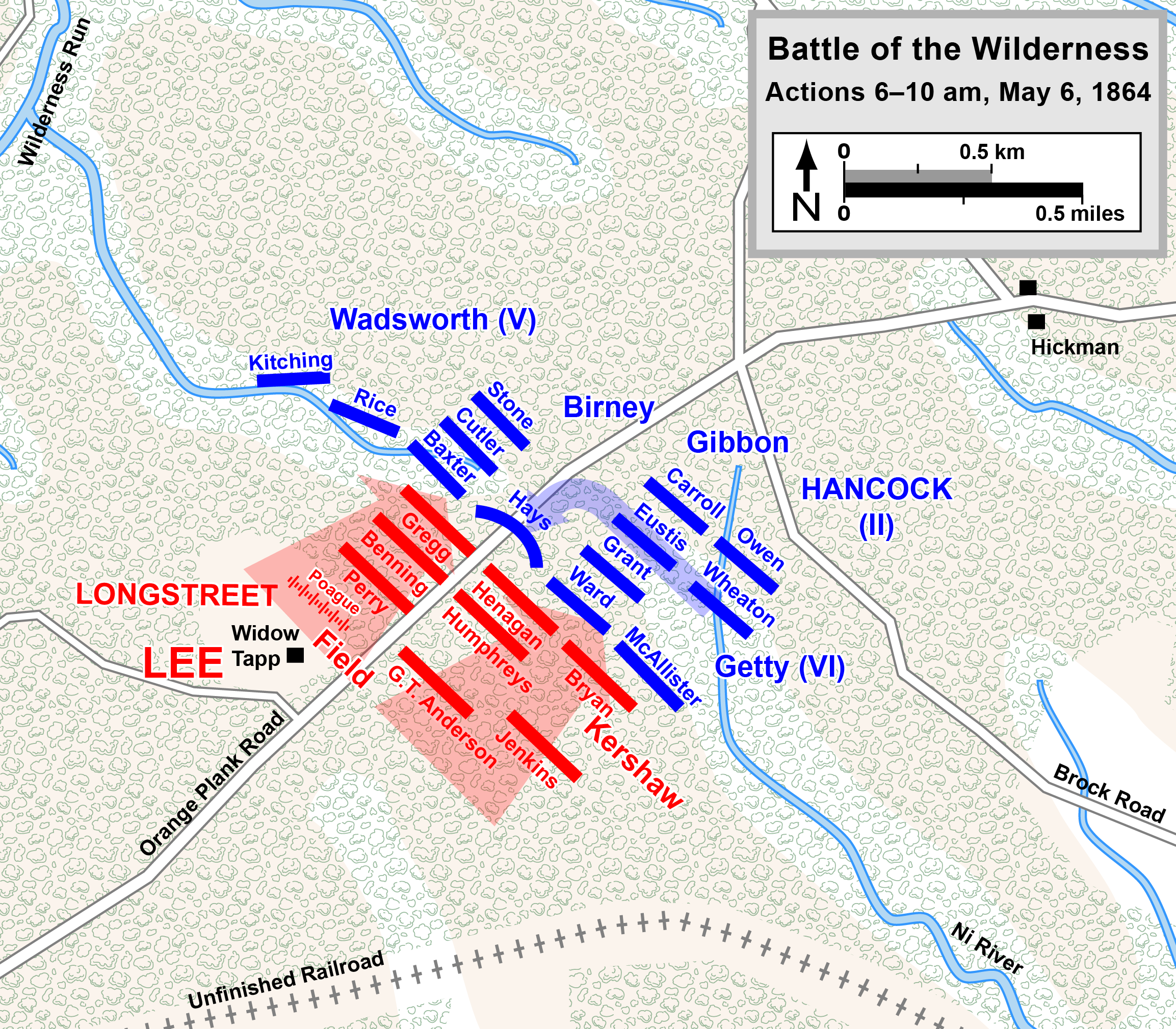
6–10 a.m., May 6. Longstreet counterattacks

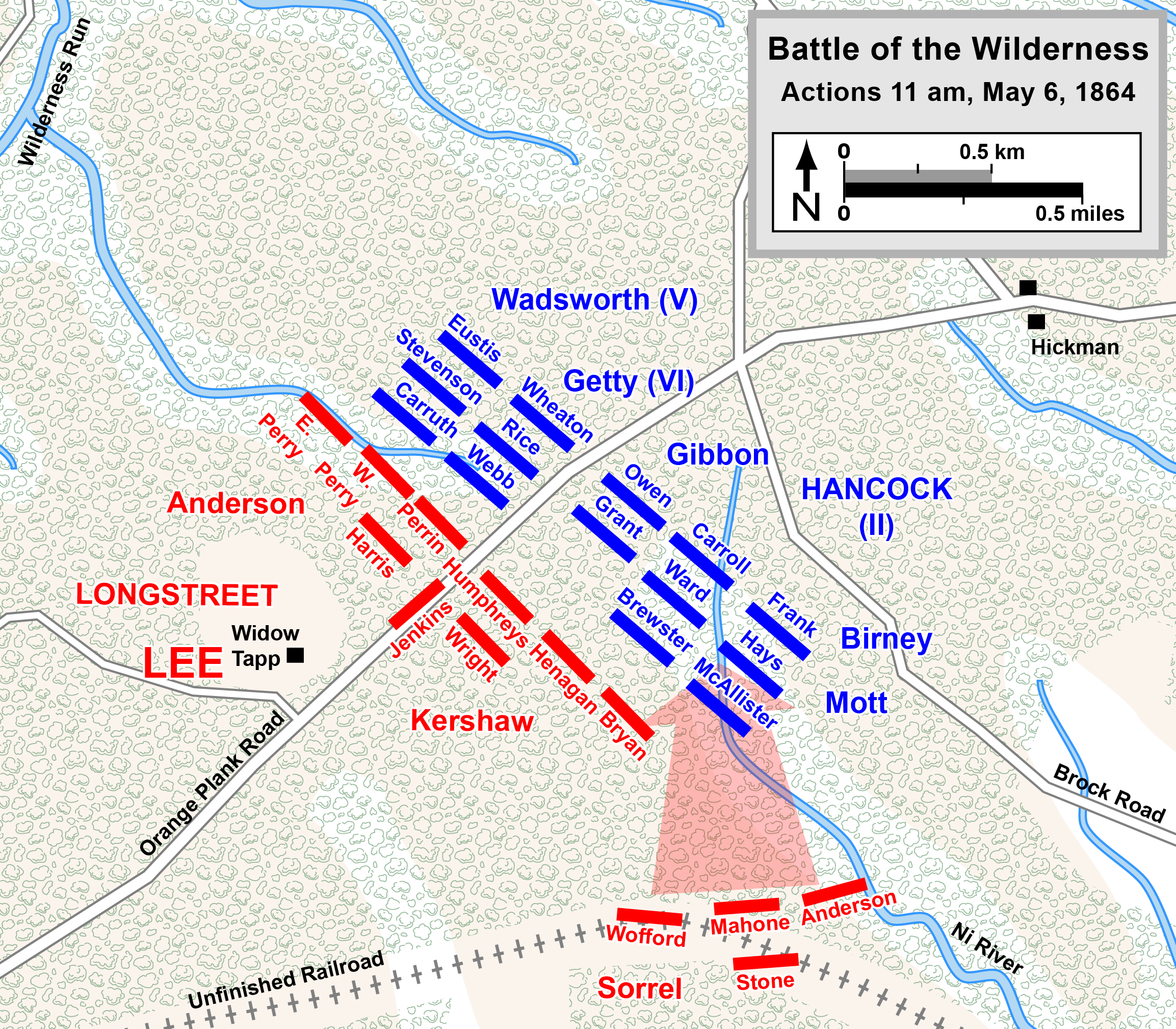
11 a.m., May 6. Longstreet attacks Hancock's flank from the railroad bed

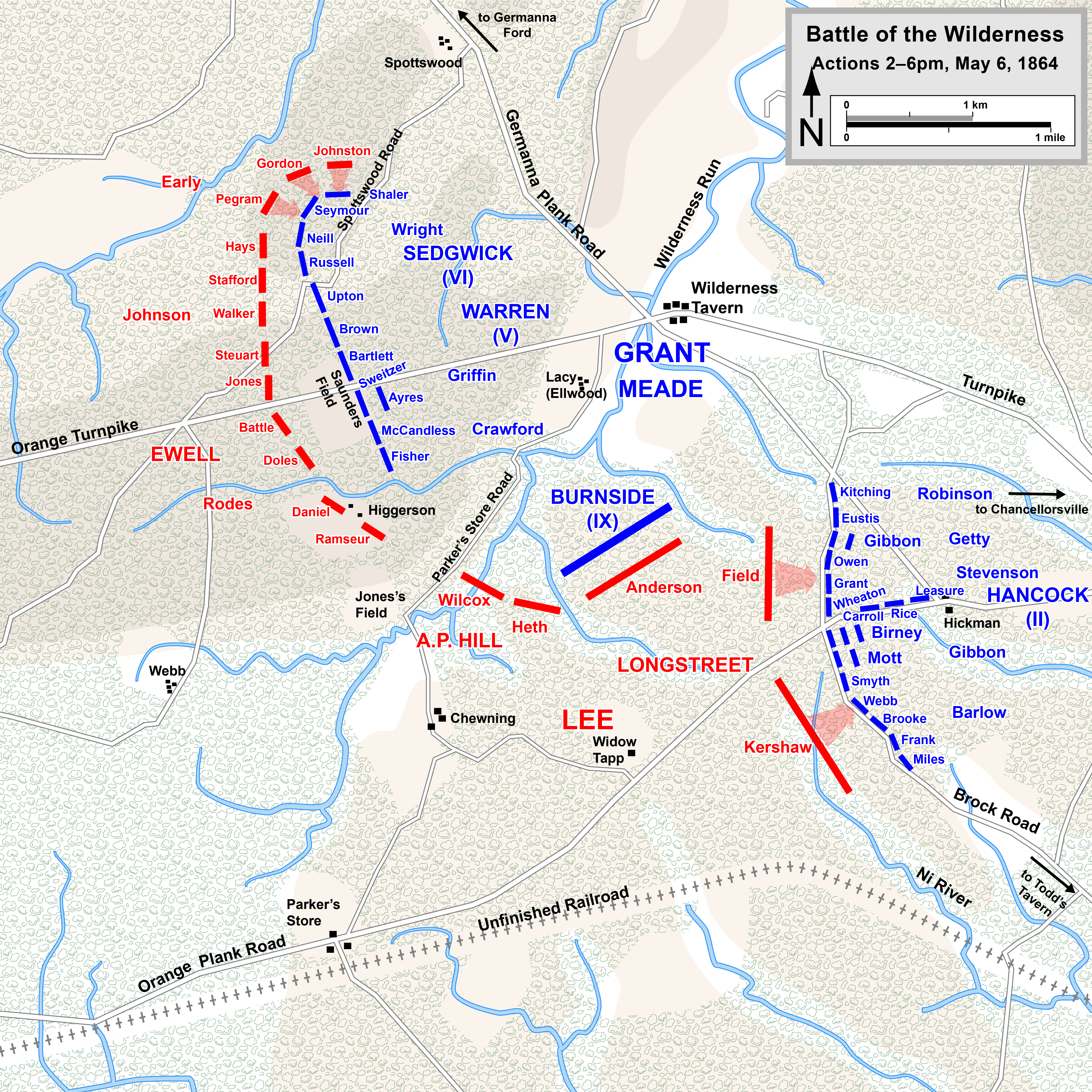
2 p.m. until dark, May 6.

=== Spotsylvania Court House (May 8–21) ===
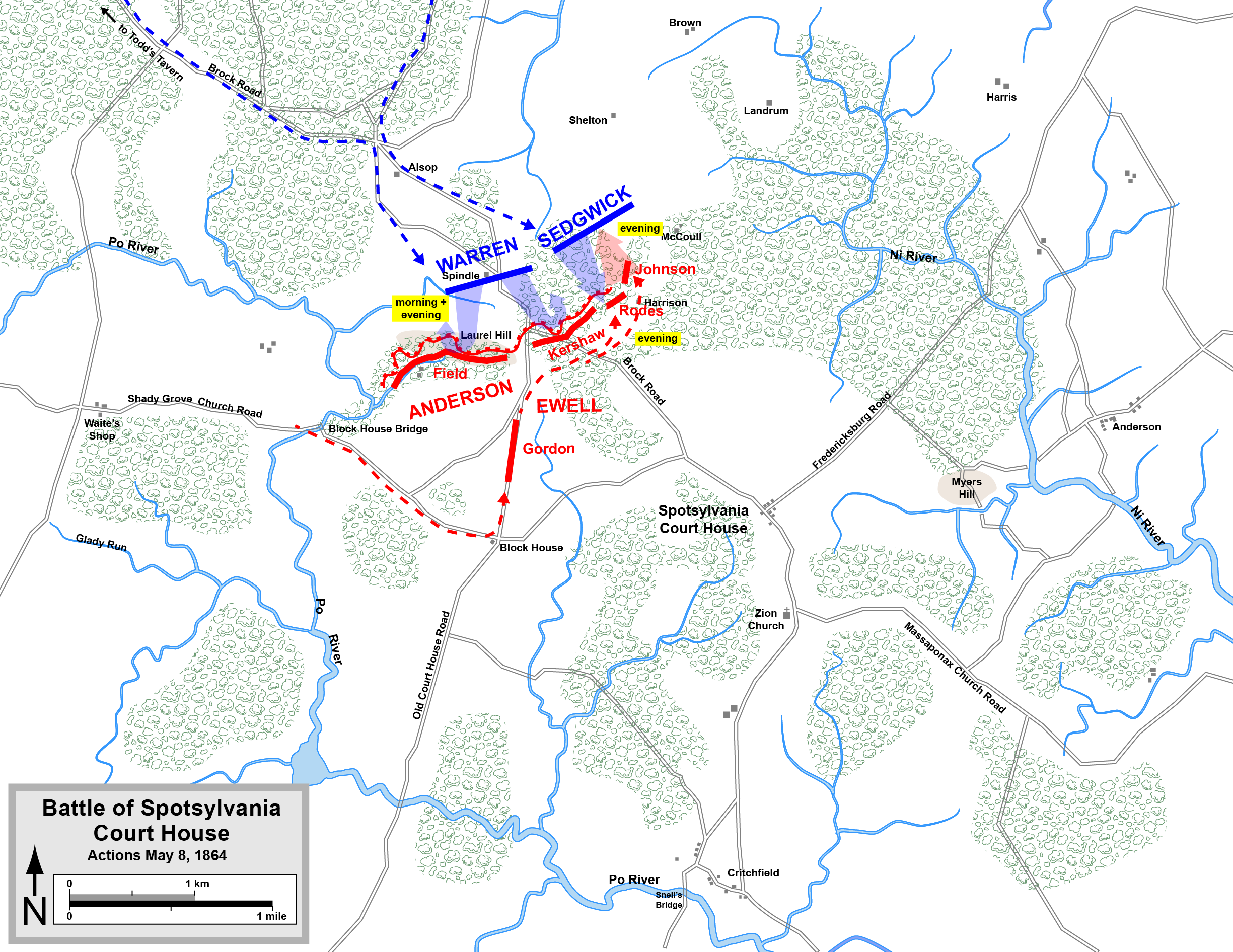
Attacks on the Laurel Hill line, May 8 Confederate Union

At dawn on May 8, Fitzhugh Lee's cavalrymen staked out a defensive line on a low ridge that they dubbed "Laurel Hill." Reinforcements from Anderson arrived just as Warren's men pulled up within 100 yards to the north. Assuming only cavalry blocked his path, Warren ordered an immediate attack. Multiple attacks by the divisions of the V Corps were repulsed with heavy casualties. In the afternoon, Sedgwick's VI Corps arrived near Laurel Hill and extended Warren's line to the east. By 7 p.m., both corps began a coordinated assault but were repulsed by heavy fire. They attempted to move around Anderson's right flank, but were surprised to find that divisions from Ewell's Second Corps had arrived in that sector to repulse them again.

Generals Meade and Sheridan had quarreled about the cavalry's performance throughout the campaign and their failures May 7–8 brought Meade's notorious temper to a boil. Sheridan told Meade that he could "whip Stuart" if Meade let him. Meade reported the conversation to Grant, who replied, "Well, he generally knows what he is talking about. Let him start right out and do it." Meade deferred to Grant's judgment and issued orders to Sheridan to "proceed against the enemy's cavalry." Sheridan's entire command of 10,000 cavalrymen departed the following day. They engaged with (and mortally wounded) Stuart at the Battle of Yellow Tavern on May 11, threatened the outskirts of Richmond, refitted near the James River, and did not return to the army until May 24. Grant and Meade were left without cavalry resources during the critical days of the battle to come.

Over the night of May 8–9, the Confederates erected a series of earthworks more than four miles (6.4 km) long, highlighted by an exposed salient known as the "Mule Shoe" extending more than a mile (1.6 km) in front of the main trench line. At about 9 a.m., Maj. Gen. John Sedgwick was inspecting his VI Corps line when he was shot through the head by a Confederate sharpshooter's bullet, dying instantly. He was replaced by Maj. Gen. Horatio G. Wright.

Grant ordered Hancock to cross the Po River and attack the Confederates' left flank, driving them back toward Burnside's position near the Ni River, while the rest of his command, in the center, watched for an opening to attack there as well. Hancock's II Corps advanced across the Po, but he delayed his attack until the morning. This error was fatal to Grant's plan. That night, Lee moved two divisions of Jubal Early's corps from Spotsylvania Court House into position against Hancock. On the morning of May 10, Grant ordered Hancock to withdraw north of the Po, leaving a single division in place to occupy the Confederates in that sector, while the rest of his army was to attack at 5 p.m. across the entire Confederate line. At 2 p.m., Jubal Early decided to attack the division, which retreated across the Po without being captured, destroying the bridges behind them.

While Hancock was in the Po sector, Warren requested permission from Meade to attack Laurel Hill at 4 p.m., uncoordinated with the rest of Grant's attack. Again the Laurel Hill line repulsed the Union troops with heavy losses. Grant was forced to postpone his 5 p.m. coordinated assault until Warren could get his troops reformed. Not informed of the delay, Brig. Gen. Gershom Mott of the II Corps moved his division forward at 5 p.m. toward the tip of the Mule Shoe. When his men reached the open field, Confederate artillery ripped them to shreds, and they retreated. At around 6 p.m., Col. Emory Upton led a group of 12 hand-picked regiments, about 5,000 men in four battle lines, against an identified weak point on the west side of the Mule Shoe. The plan was for Upton's men to rush across the open field without pausing to fire and reload, reaching the earthworks before the Confederates could fire more than a couple of shots. The plan worked well initially, but Generals Lee and Ewell were quick to organize a vigorous counterattack with brigades from all sectors of the Mule Shoe. No Union supporting units arrived. Upton's men were driven out of the Confederate works, and he reluctantly ordered them to retreat.

Despite his reverses on May 10, Grant had reason for optimism because of the partial success of Upton's innovative assault. He planned to use the same tactics with Hancock's entire corps. On the Confederate side, Lee received some intelligence reports that made him believe Grant was planning to withdraw toward Fredericksburg. If this happened, he wanted to follow up with an immediate attack. Concerned about the mobility of his artillery to support the potential attack, he ordered that the guns be withdrawn from Allegheny Johnson's division in the Mule Shoe to be ready for a movement to the right. He was completely unaware, of course, that this was exactly the place Grant intended to attack. Johnson requested to Ewell that his artillery be returned, but somehow the order did not reach the artillery units until 3:30 a.m. on May 12, 30 minutes before Hancock's assault was planned to start.

Hancock's assault started at 4:35 a.m. on May 12 and easily crashed through the Confederate works. Despite the initial success at obliterating much of the Mule Shoe salient, there was a flaw in the Union plan—no one had considered how to capitalize on the breakthrough. The 15,000 infantrymen of Hancock's II Corps had crowded into a narrow front about a half mile wide and soon lost all unit cohesion, becoming little more than an armed mob. Following the initial shock, the Confederate leadership at all levels began to react well to the Union onslaught and reinforcements were rushed in to stem the tide.

As Hancock bogged down, Grant sent in reinforcements, ordering both Wright and Warren to move forward. The VI Corps division of Brig. Gen. Thomas H. Neill headed for the western leg of the Mule Shoe, at the point where it turned to the south. This sector of the line, where the heaviest fighting of the day would occur, became known as the "Bloody Angle." Heavy rain began to fall, and both sides fought on the earthworks slippery with both water and blood. The opposing troops gunpowder became wet and unusable, forcing them into a massive close-quarters, hand to hand struggle similar to ancient battles. Warren's attack at Laurel Hill began on a small scale around 8:15 a.m. For some of his men, this was their fourth or fifth attack against the same objective and few fought with enthusiasm. They were repulsed again. Burnside advanced against the eastern leg of the Mule Shoe before dawn, materially aiding Hancock's breakthrough. At 2 p.m., Grant and Lee coincidentally ordered simultaneous attacks in this stalemated sector. The advance by Union Brig. Gen. Orlando B. Willcox's division was stopped as Brig. Gen. James H. Lane's brigade moved forward and hit them in the flank.

Throughout the afternoon, Confederate engineers scrambled to create a new defensive line 500 yards further south at the base of the Mule Shoe, while fighting at the Bloody Angle continued day and night with neither side achieving an advantage. At 4 a.m. on May 13, the exhausted Confederate infantrymen were notified that the new line was ready, and they withdrew from the original earthworks unit by unit. The combat they had endured for almost 24 hours was characterized by an intensity of firepower never previously seen in Civil War battles, as the entire landscape was flattened, all the foliage destroyed. May 12 was the most intensive day of fighting during the battle, with Union casualties of about 9,000, Confederate 8,000; the Confederate loss includes about 3,000 prisoners captured in the Mule Shoe.

Despite the significant casualties of May 12, Grant was undeterred. He planned to reorient his lines and shift the center of potential action to the east of Spotsylvania, where he could renew the battle. He ordered the V and VI Corps to move behind the II Corps and take positions past the left flank of the IX Corps. On the night of May 13–14, the corps began a difficult march in heavy rain. Grant notified Washington that, having endured five days of almost continuous rain, his army could not resume offensive operations until they had 24 hours of dry weather. The weather finally cleared on May 17. Grant ordered the II Corps and the VI Corps to attack against the Mule Shoe area again at sunrise, May 18. Unfortunately for the Union plan, the former Confederate works were still occupied by Ewell's Second Corps and they had used the intervening time to improve the earthworks and the obstacles laid out in front of them. Unlike on May 12, they were not caught by surprise. As Hancock's men advanced, they were caught up in abatis and subjected to artillery fire so devastating that infantry rifle fire was not necessary to repulse the attack. Wright and Burnside had no better luck in supporting attacks.

Grant decided to abandon the Spotsylvania area. He ordered Hancock's II Corps to march to the railroad line between Fredericksburg and Richmond, and then turn south. With luck, Lee might take the bait and follow, seeking to overwhelm and destroy the isolated corps. In that case, Grant would chase Lee with his remaining corps and strike him before the Confederates could entrench again. Before Hancock began to move, Lee ordered Ewell to conduct a reconnaissance in force to locate the northern flank of the Union army. Ewell fought near the Harris farm with several units of Union heavy artillery soldiers who had recently been converted to infantry duty before he was recalled by Lee. Grant's intended advance of Hancock's corps was delayed by the Harris farm engagement, so the troops did not begin their movement south until the night of May 20–21. Lee did not fall into Grant's trap of attacking Hancock, but traveled on a parallel path to the North Anna River.

Battle of Spotsylvania Court House

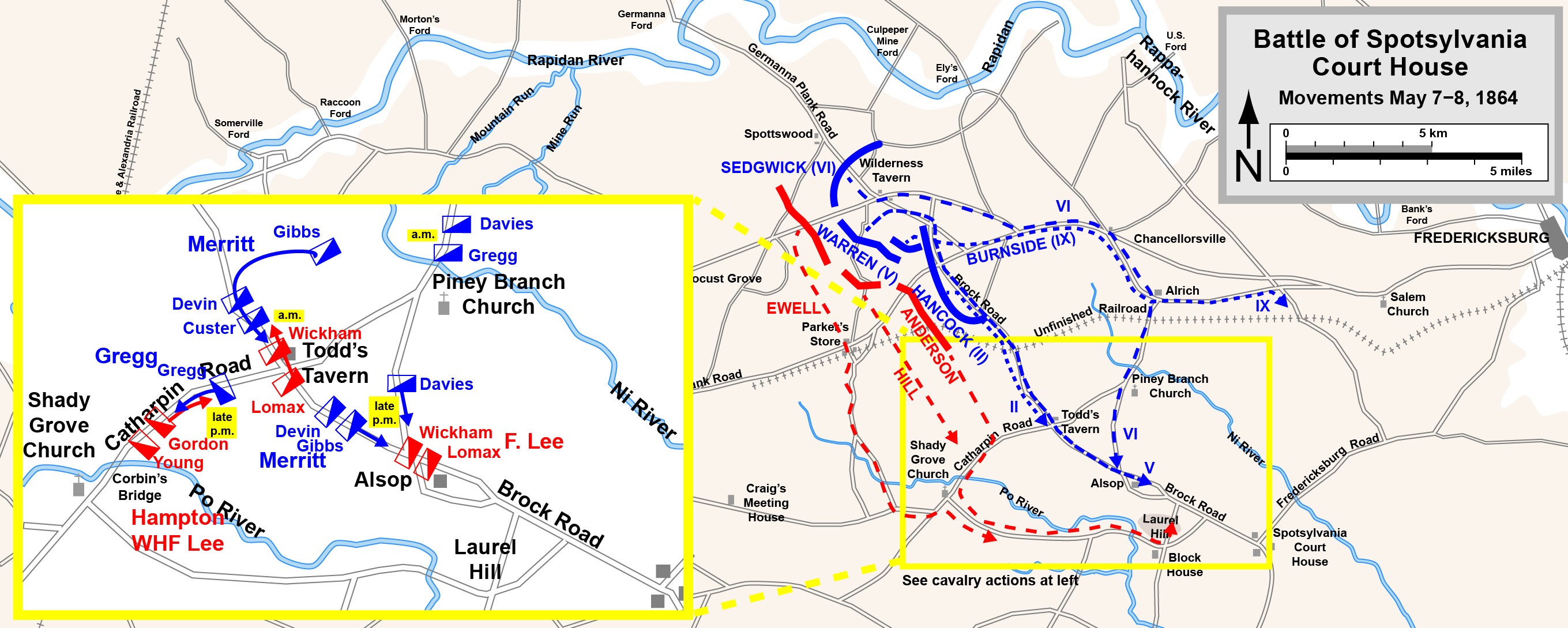
Movements on May 7, 1864; cavalry actions inset

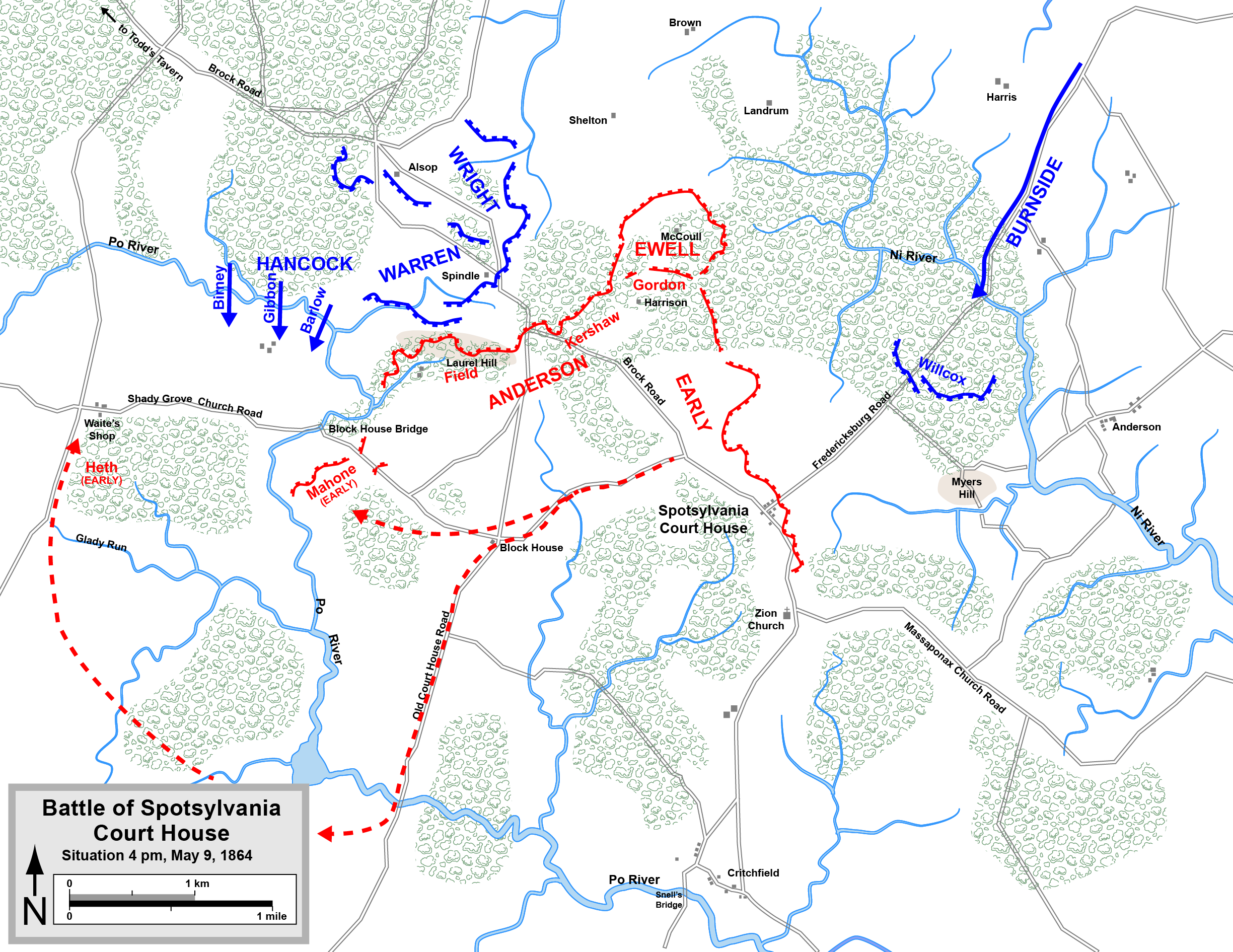
Positions and movements on the Union flanks, May 9

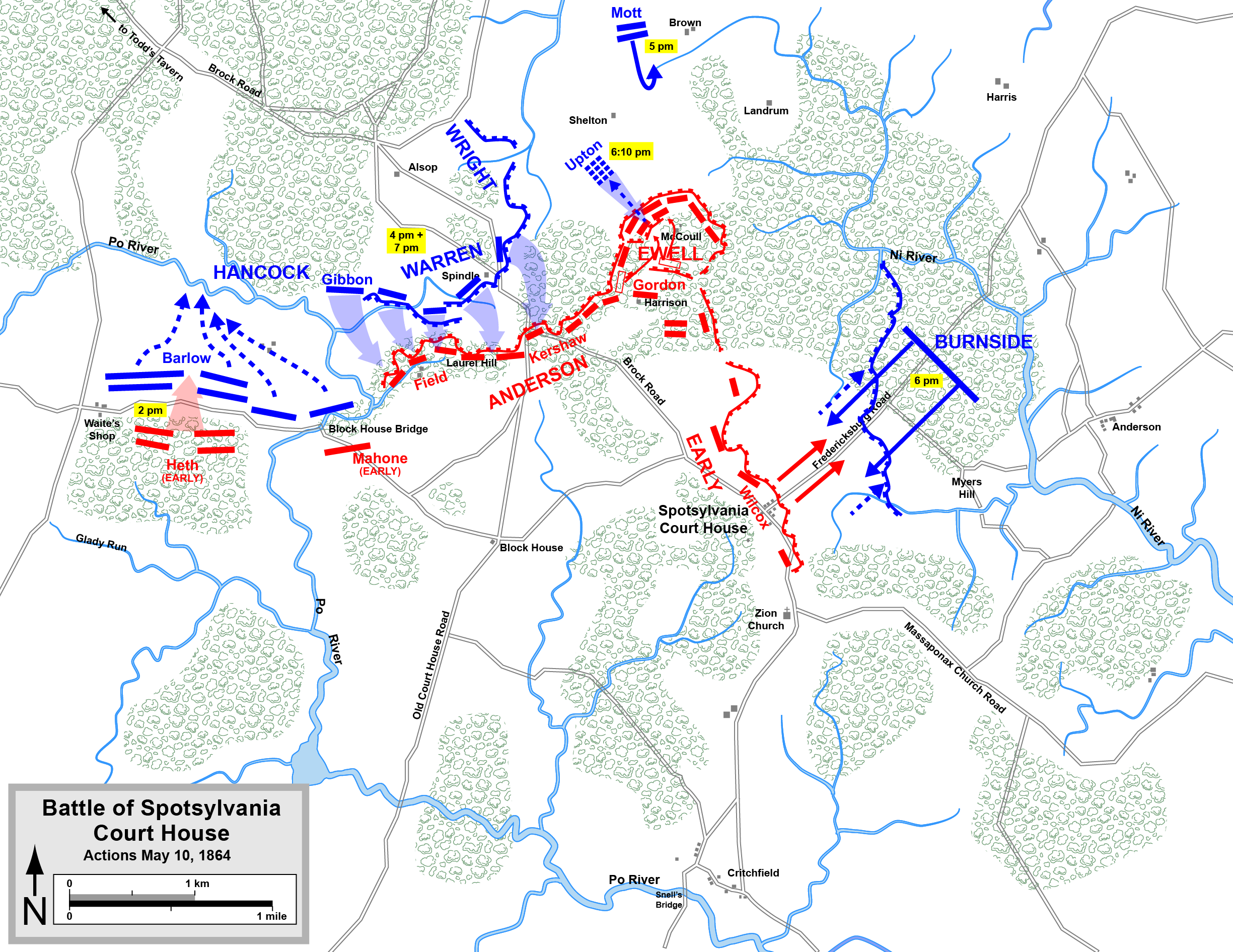
Grant attacks, May 10

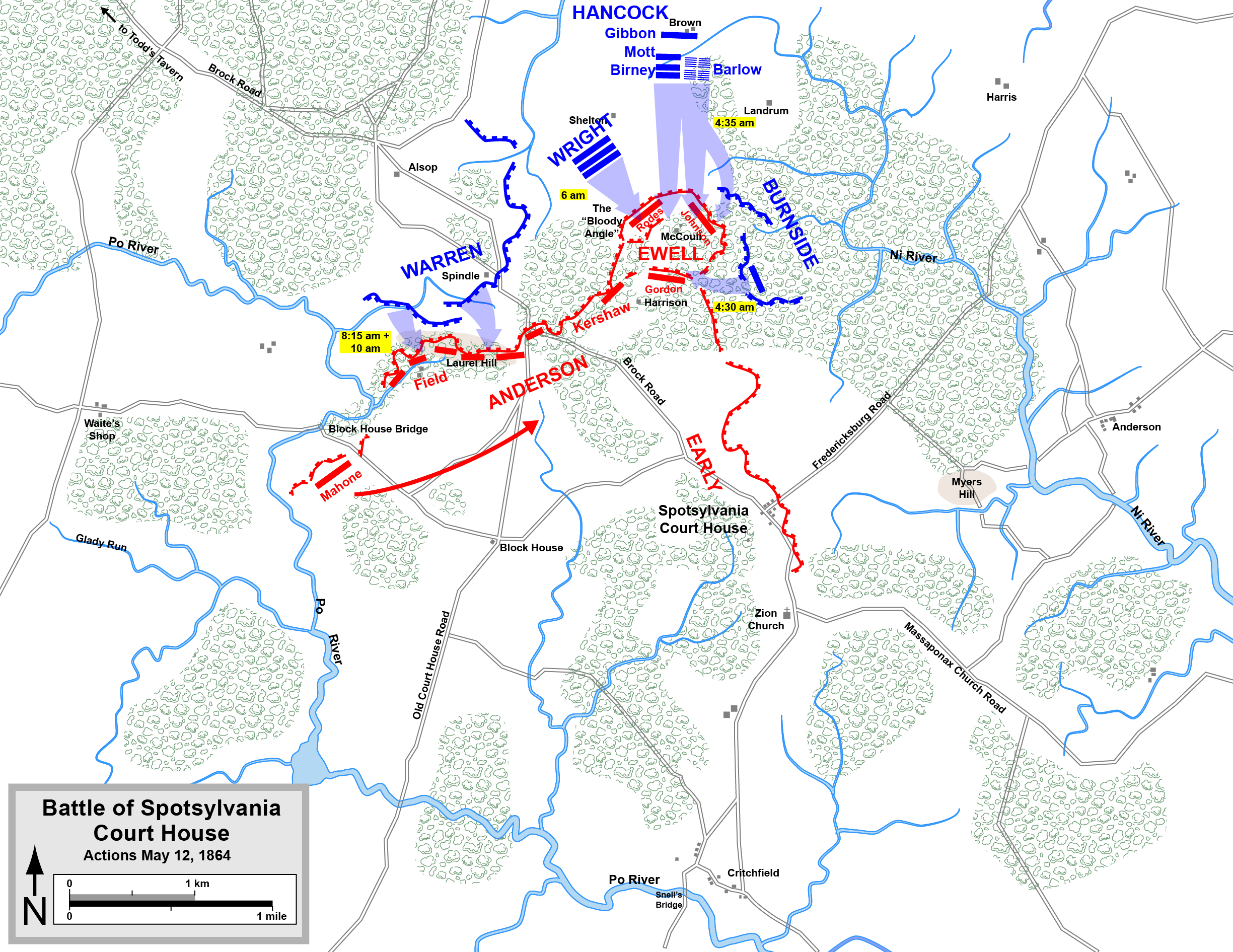
Grant's grand assault, May 12

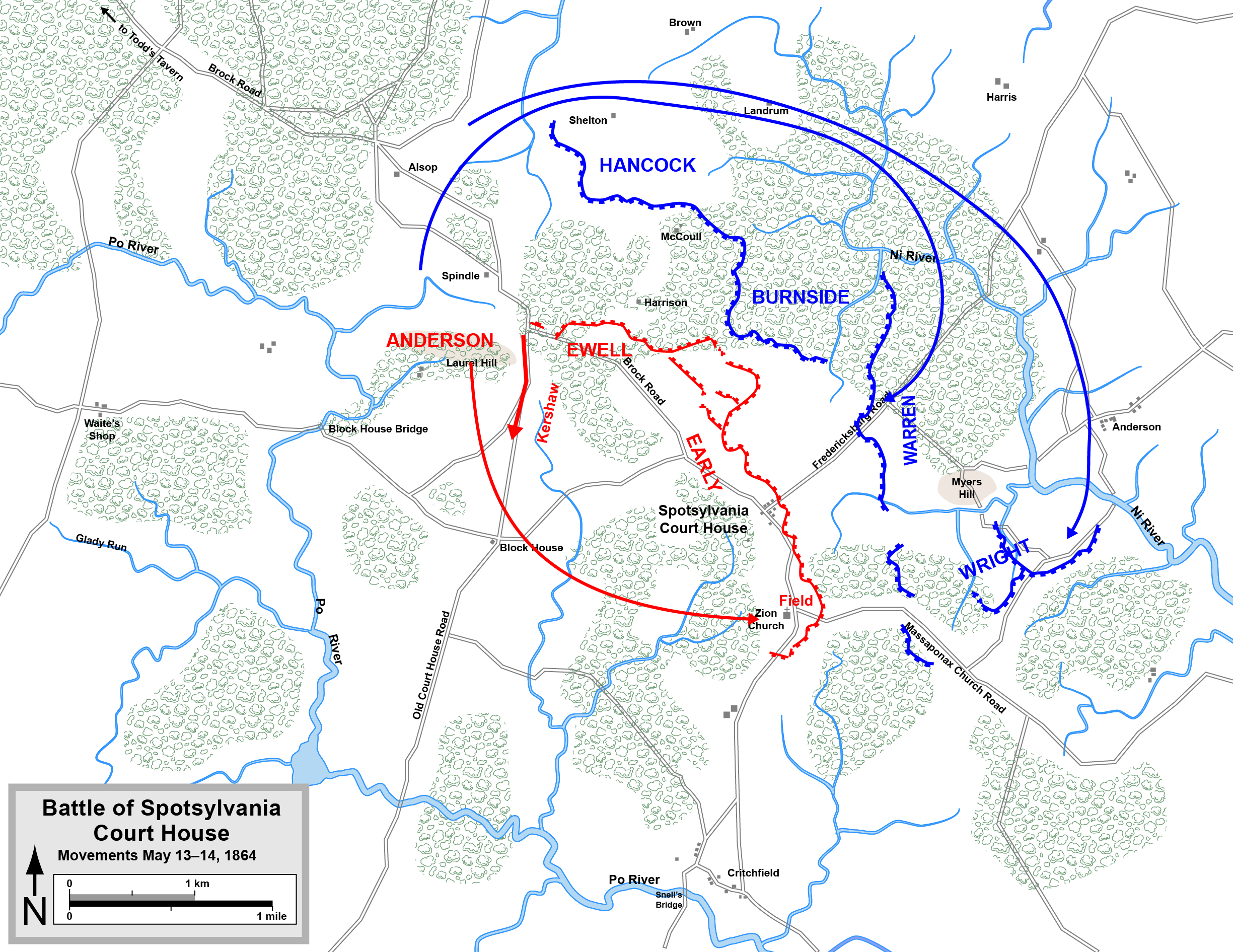
Reorienting the lines, May 13–16

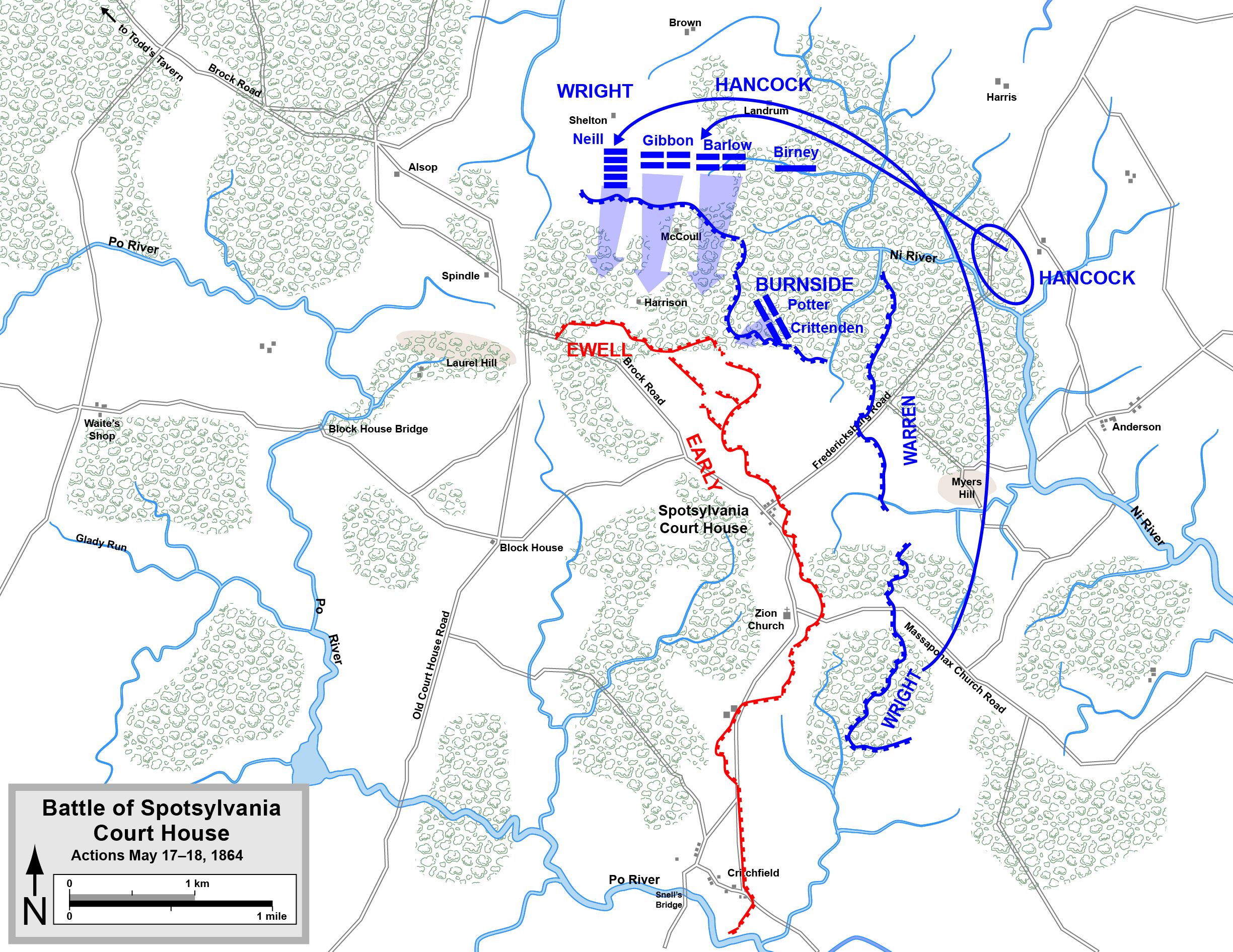
Movements, May 17, final Union attacks, May 18

=== Yellow Tavern (May 11) ===
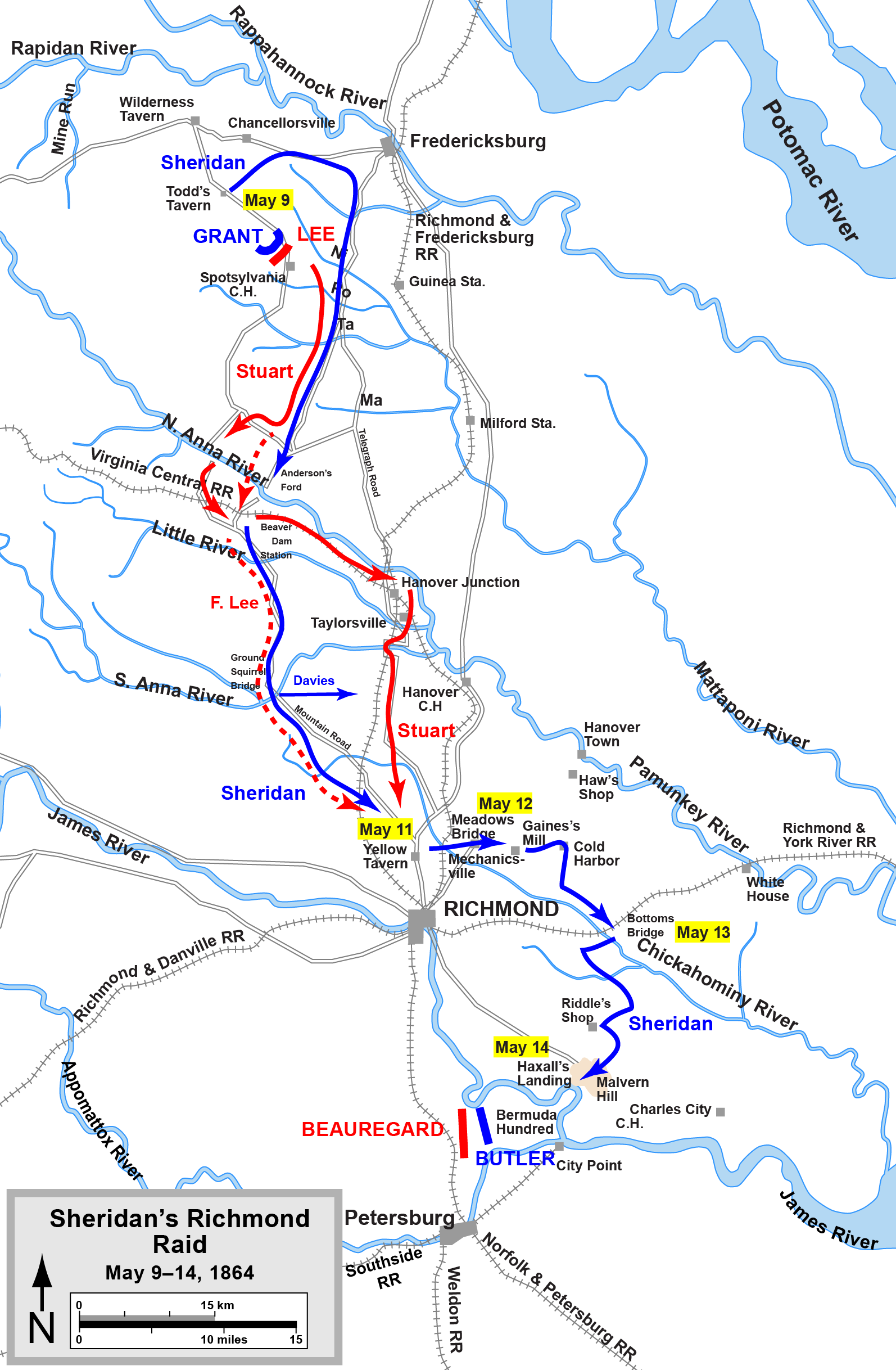
Sheridan's Richmond Raid, including the Battles of Yellow Tavern and Meadow Bridge

For the early days of the campaign—the Wilderness and the approach to Spotsylvania Court House—Meade had employed Sheridan's Cavalry Corps primarily in the traditional role of screening and reconnaissance, whereas Sheridan saw the value of wielding his force as an independently operating offensive weapon for wide-ranging raids into the rear areas of the enemy. On May 8, Sheridan told Meade that if his command were freed to operate as an independent unit, he could defeat "Jeb" Stuart. Grant was intrigued and convinced Meade of the value of Sheridan's request.

On May 9, over 10,000 of Sheridan's troopers rode to the southeast with 32 artillery pieces to move behind Lee's army. The column, which at times stretched for over 13 miles (21 km), reached the Confederate forward supply base at Beaver Dam Station that evening. Sheridan's men destroyed numerous railroad cars and six locomotives of the Virginia Central Railroad, destroyed telegraph wires, and rescued almost 400 Union soldiers who had been captured in the Wilderness.

Stuart moved his 4,500 troopers to get between Sheridan and Richmond. The two forces met at noon on May 11 at Yellow Tavern, an abandoned inn located six miles (9.7 km) north of Richmond. Not only did the Union outnumber the Confederates by three divisions to two brigades, it had superior firepower—all were armed with rapid-firing Spencer carbines. The Confederate troopers tenaciously resisted from the low ridgeline bordering the road to Richmond, fighting for over three hours. A countercharge by the 1st Virginia Cavalry pushed the advancing Union troopers back from the hilltop as Stuart, mounted on horseback, shouted encouragement. As the 5th Michigan Cavalry streamed in retreat past Stuart, he was shot, and he died in Richmond the following day. The fighting kept up for an hour after Stuart was wounded, Maj. Gen. Fitzhugh Lee taking temporary command.

=== Meadow Bridge (May 12) ===
After Yellow Tavern, Sheridan led his troops southward towards Richmond on May 11, carefully feeling his way through the abandoned outer defensive works. He kept up his movement down the Brook Pike, not realizing that he was boxing himself into a potential trap. Sheridan found himself only two and half miles from his objective, but saw that the intermediate defenses in his front swarmed with enemy troops. His left flank was against the swollen Chickahominy, and Confederate cavalry threatened his rear, hoping to capture the Union force.

Sheridan decided to force a crossing of the river at Meadow Bridge, where the Virginia Central Railroad crossed the river. He assigned the Michigan brigade of Brig. Gen. George A. Custer, part of Brig. Gen. Wesley Merritt's division, to seize the span and the high bluffs beyond. The rest of Sheridan's command had to hold the Confederates at bay while Custer executed his orders. The rearguard of Brig. Gen. David McM. Gregg's division was assailed on three sides when it was light enough for a brigade of Confederate infantry to sally forth from the fortifications and attack. Soon, other Confederates, including Richmond citizens hastily pressed into military service, joined in the efforts to break through the rear lines. James H. Wilson's men were initially pushed back in some confusion, but Gregg had concealed a heavy line of skirmishers armed with repeating carbines in a brushy ravine. His men poured forth a destructive fire, halting the final Confederate advances, assisted by some of Wilson's men who turned the flank of the attacking column. Federal horse artillery made sure that the Confederate infantry no longer was a threat, and three mounted cavalry regiments skirmished with approaching enemy cavalry, turning them aside and protecting the rear.

In the meantime, Custer's 5th Michigan Cavalry used snipers to suppress Confederate rifle fire while several daring dismounted troopers crossed the damaged railroad bridge, hopping from railroad tie to tie while menaced by persistent enemy artillery fire. Followed by the 6th Michigan, they succeeded in the early afternoon in clearing the north bank of the Chickahominy and gaining a foothold on the Confederate side of the river. Custer's men pinned down remaining threatening enemy units and captured two artillery pieces, while pioneers energetically planked the bridge to provide safe passage for large numbers of men and horses. By mid-afternoon, Merritt's entire division had crossed and engaged the Confederate hasty works on Richmond Heights, driving the defenders back to Gaines's Mill. By 4 p.m., the rest of Sheridan's cavalry had crossed the river.

Sheridan destroyed the Virginia Central Bridge in his wake to prevent further pursuit. After his men had rested, Sheridan brushed aside the remaining Confederate resistance in the area and marched his column to Mechanicsville. They bivouacked that night at Gaines's Mill, which was burned the following morning by some of the stragglers; Sheridan ordered a bucket brigade to douse the flames. Upon reaching Bottom's Bridge over the Chickahominy, they found it had also been damaged and rested there for the night while it was repaired. By this time, Sheridan's men were suffering from hunger and it was becoming urgent that they reach Union lines. On May 14, he led his men to Haxall's Landing on the James River, linking up with Maj. Gen. Benjamin Butler's force, ending his raid. After resupplying with Butler, Sheridan's men returned to join Grant at Chesterfield Station on May 24.

Sheridan's raid was an overall tactical success, having killed Jeb Stuart at Yellow Tavern and beaten Fitzhugh Lee at Meadow Bridge, all with relatively minimal casualties—about 625 men for the entire raid, compared to 800 Confederate. From a strategic standpoint, however, the raid deprived General Grant of the cavalry resources that would have been helpful at Spotsylvania Court House and his subsequent advance to the North Anna River, and there are lingering questions about whether Sheridan should have attempted to assault the city of Richmond. In the latter case, Sheridan believed it would not have been worth the risk in casualties and he recognized that the chances of holding the city for more than a brief time would be minimal; any advantages would primarily result from damage to Confederate morale.

=== North Anna (May 23–26) ===
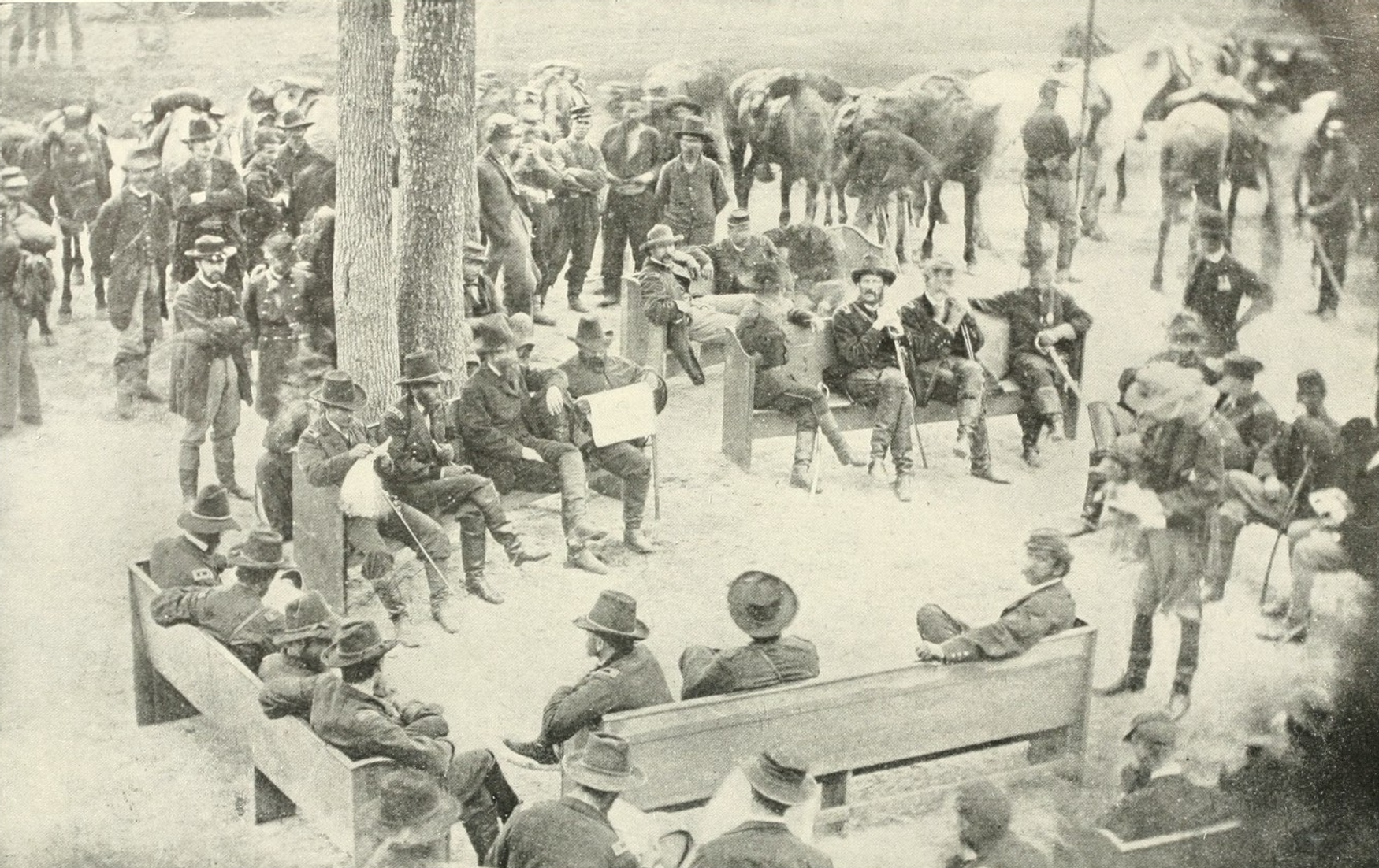
Union staff meeting at Massaponax Baptist Church on May 21, 1864. Grant has his back to the smaller tree with Charles Anderson Dana to his left, while Meade is seated at the far left.

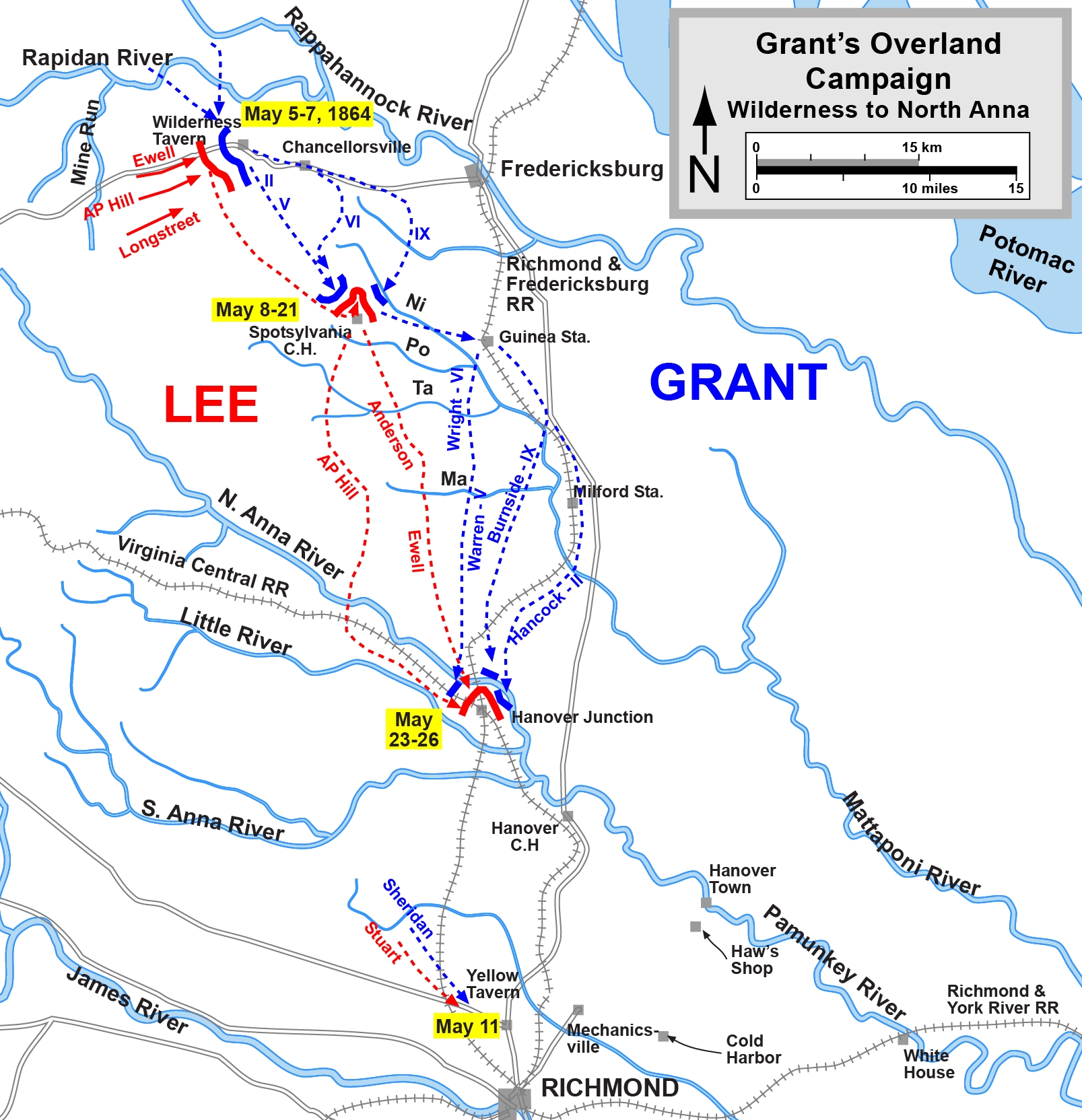
The Overland Campaign from the Wilderness to the North Anna River, May 5–26, 1864 Confederate Union

As the armies started their movements from Spotsylvania, the odds between them had become closer. Grant's army totaled approximately 68,000 men, depleted from the start of the campaign by battle losses, illnesses, and expired enlistments. Lee's was about 53,000. For the first time in the campaign he received sizable reinforcements, including three of the four brigades in Maj. Gen. George E. Pickett's division (about 6,000 men) from the James River defenses and two brigades (2,500 men) of Maj. Gen. John C. Breckinridge's command from the Shenandoah Valley.

Grant's objective following Spotsylvania was the North Anna River, about 25 miles (40 km) south, and the important railroad intersection just south of it, Hanover Junction. Grant knew that Lee could probably beat him in a straight race to the North Anna, so he devised a stratagem that might be a successful alternative. He designated Hancock's II Corps to head southeast from Spotsylvania to Milford Station, hoping that Lee would take the bait and attack this isolated corps. If he did, Grant would attack him with his three remaining corps; if he did not, Grant would have lost nothing and his advance element might reach the North Anna before Lee could.

Hancock's corps of 20,000 men started marching the night of May 20–21. He was surprised to encounter some of Pickett's men at Milford Station on May 21, from which he inferred correctly that Lee was being reinforced. Rather than risk his corps in a fight in an isolated location, he decided to terminate his maneuver. Lee was still in the dark about Grant's intentions and was reluctant to disengage prematurely from the Spotsylvania Court House line. He cautiously extended Ewell's Corps to the Telegraph Road and notified Breckinridge, who was en route to join Lee, to stop at Hanover Junction and defend the North Anna River line until Lee could join him. Meanwhile, Grant started the rest of his corps on their marches. Lee ordered Ewell to march south on the Telegraph Road, followed by Anderson's Corps, and A.P. Hill's Corps on parallel roads to the west. Lee's orders were not urgent; he knew that Ewell had 25 miles (40 km) to march over relatively good roads, versus Hancock's 34 miles (55 km) over inferior roads.

On the morning of May 23, Warren and Hancock approached the North Anna. There were no significant fortifications to their front. Lee had misjudged Grant's plan, assuming any advance against the North Anna would be a mere diversion, while the main body of Grant's army continued its flanking march to the east. At the Chesterfield Bridge crossing the Telegraph Road, a small South Carolina brigade under Col. John W. Henagan had created a dirt redoubt, and there was a small party guarding the railroad bridge downstream, but all the other river crossings were left undefended. Grant had been presented with a golden opportunity if he moved quickly enough to take advantage of it.

Hancock's men, led by the division of Maj. Gen. David B. Birney, overwhelmed Henagan's small force, which fled across the bridge. Union sharpshooters discouraged Confederate attempts to burn the bridge. Hancock's men did not cross the bridge and seize ground to the south because Confederate artillery was laying down heavy fire against them. At Jericho Mills, Warren found the river ford unprotected and established a beachhead south of the river. General Lee convinced his Third Corps commander, A.P. Hill, that Warren's movement was simply a feint, so Hill sent only a single division, commanded by Maj. Gen. Cadmus M. Wilcox, to deal with Warren's supposedly minor threat. The Union troops were taken by surprise and their right flank was beaten back, but they were supported by three batteries of artillery, which slowed the Confederate advance until Union reinforcements arrived to end the brief battle. The next morning, Lee expressed his displeasure at Hill's performance: "General Hill, why did you let those people cross here? Why didn't you throw your whole force on them and drive them back as Jackson would have done?"

By the evening of May 23, Lee finally understood that a major battle was developing in this location and began to plan his defensive position. He and his chief engineer devised a solution: a five-mile (8 km) line that formed an inverted "V" shape with its apex on the river at Ox Ford, the only defensible crossing in the area. On the western line of the V, reaching southwest to anchor on Little River, was the corps of A.P. Hill; on the east were Anderson and Ewell, extending through Hanover Junction and ending behind a swamp. Lee's men worked nonstop overnight to complete the fortifications. The new position represented a significant potential threat to Grant. By moving south of the river, Lee hoped that Grant would assume that he was retreating, leaving only a token force to prevent a crossing at Ox Ford. If Grant pursued, then Lee hoped the pointed wedge of the inverted V would split Grant's army and Lee could concentrate on interior lines to defeat one wing; the other Union wing would have to cross the North Anna twice to support the attacked wing.

On the morning of May 24, Hancock's II Corps crossed the Chesterfield Bridge with Maj. Gen. John Gibbon's division in the lead. Grant had begun to fall into Lee's trap. Seeing the ease of crossing the river, he assumed the Confederates were retreating. He wired to Washington: "The enemy have fallen back from North Anna. We are in pursuit."

The only visible opposition to the Union crossing was at Ox Ford, which Grant interpreted to be a rear guard action, and ordered Burnside's IX Corps to deal with it. Burnside's division under Brig. Gen. Samuel W. Crawford marched downriver to Quarles Mill and seized the ford there. Burnside ordered Maj. Gen. Thomas L. Crittenden's division to cross over at the ford and follow the river's southern bank to Ox Ford and attack the Confederate position from the west. Crittenden's lead brigade was under Brig. Gen. James H. Ledlie, who was known for excessive drinking of alcohol in the field. Intoxicated and ambitious, Ledlie decided to attack the Confederate position with his brigade alone. Encountering the Confederate earthworks manned by Brig. Gen. William Mahone's division, Ledlie's men were immediately repulsed. Crittenden sent word to Ledlie not to attack until the full division had crossed the river, but Ledlie, by now completely drunk, ordered a charge. The Confederates waited to open fire until they were at close range, and the effect was to drive Ledlie's leading men into ditches for protection. Two Massachusetts regiments rallied, but Mahone's Mississippi troops stepped out of their works and shot them down. Despite his miserable performance, Ledlie received praise from his division commander that his brigade "behaved gallantly." He was promoted to division command after the battle and his drunkenness in the field continued to plague his men, culminating in his humiliating failure at the Battle of the Crater in July, after which he was relieved of command, never to receive another assignment. Hancock's II Corps began pushing south from Chesterfield Bridge at about the same time that Ledlie was initially crossing the river, but the combined divisions of Maj. Gens. John Gibbon and David B. Birney could not break the Confederate line.

Although the Union army had done precisely what Lee had hoped it would do, Lee's plan came to naught. The morning of the river crossing, Lee suddenly suffered a debilitating attack of diarrhea and was forced to remain in his tent, bedridden. Unfortunately, he had not sufficiently empowered a subordinate commander to take over during his illness. Lee lamented in his tent, "We must strike them a blow—we must never let them pass again—we must strike them a blow." But Lee lacked the means to execute his plan. Grant identified the situation he faced with a divided army and ordered his men to stop advancing and to build earthworks of their own.

A significant command change occurred on the evening of May 24. Grant and Meade had had numerous quarrels during the campaign about strategy and tactics and tempers were reaching the boiling point. Grant mollified Meade somewhat by ordering that Maj. Gen. Ambrose Burnside and his IX Corps would henceforth report to Meade's Army of the Potomac, rather than to Grant directly. Although Burnside was a more senior major general than Meade, he accepted the new subordinate position without protest.

On May 25, light skirmishing occurred between the lines and Union soldiers occupied themselves by tearing up 5 miles of the Virginia Central Railroad, a key supply line from the Shenandoah Valley to Richmond. Grant's options were limited. The slaughter at Spotsylvania Court House ruled out the option of frontal attacks against the Confederate line and getting around either Confederate flank was infeasible. However, the Union general remained optimistic. He was convinced that Lee had demonstrated the weakness of his army by not attacking when he had the upper hand. He wrote to the Army's chief of staff, Maj. Gen. Henry W. Halleck: "Lee's army is really whipped. ... I may be mistaken but I feel that our success over Lee's army is already assured."

Battle of North Anna

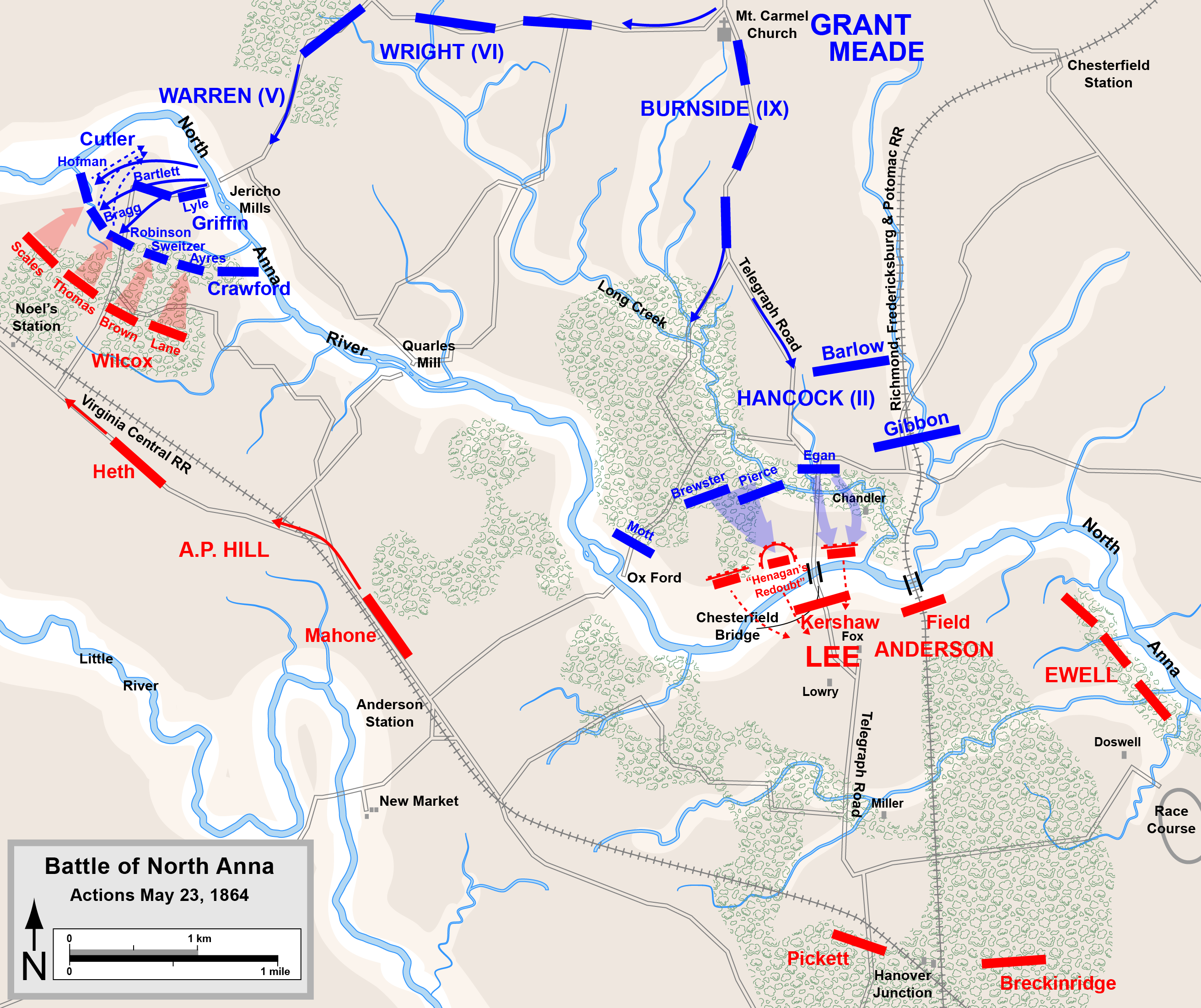
Actions on May 23: Hancock attacks "Henagan's Redoubt", A.P. Hill attempts to repulse Warren's beachhead

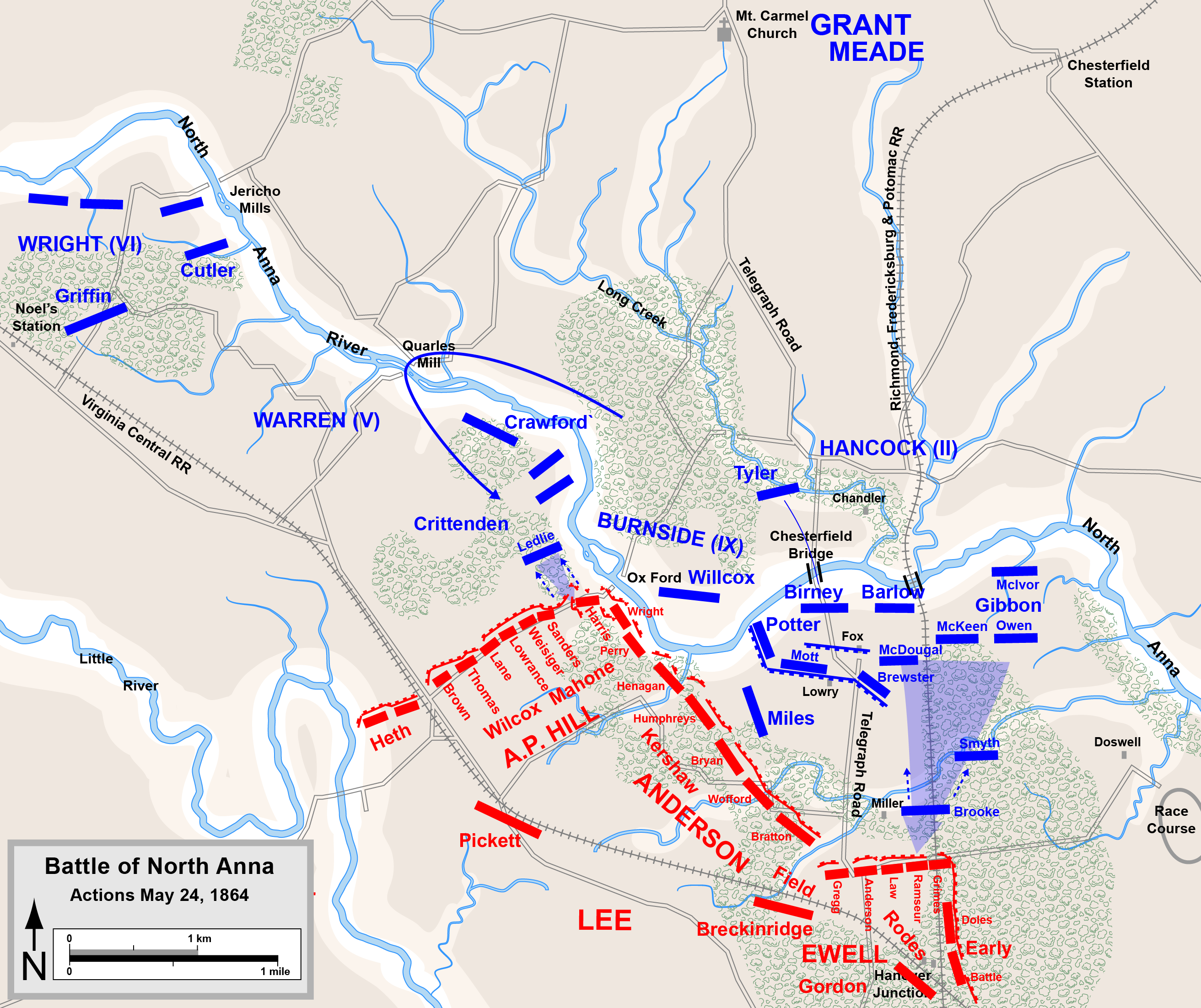
Actions on May 24: Ledlie attacks Ox Ford, Hancock attempts to advance against the eastern leg of the inverted "V"

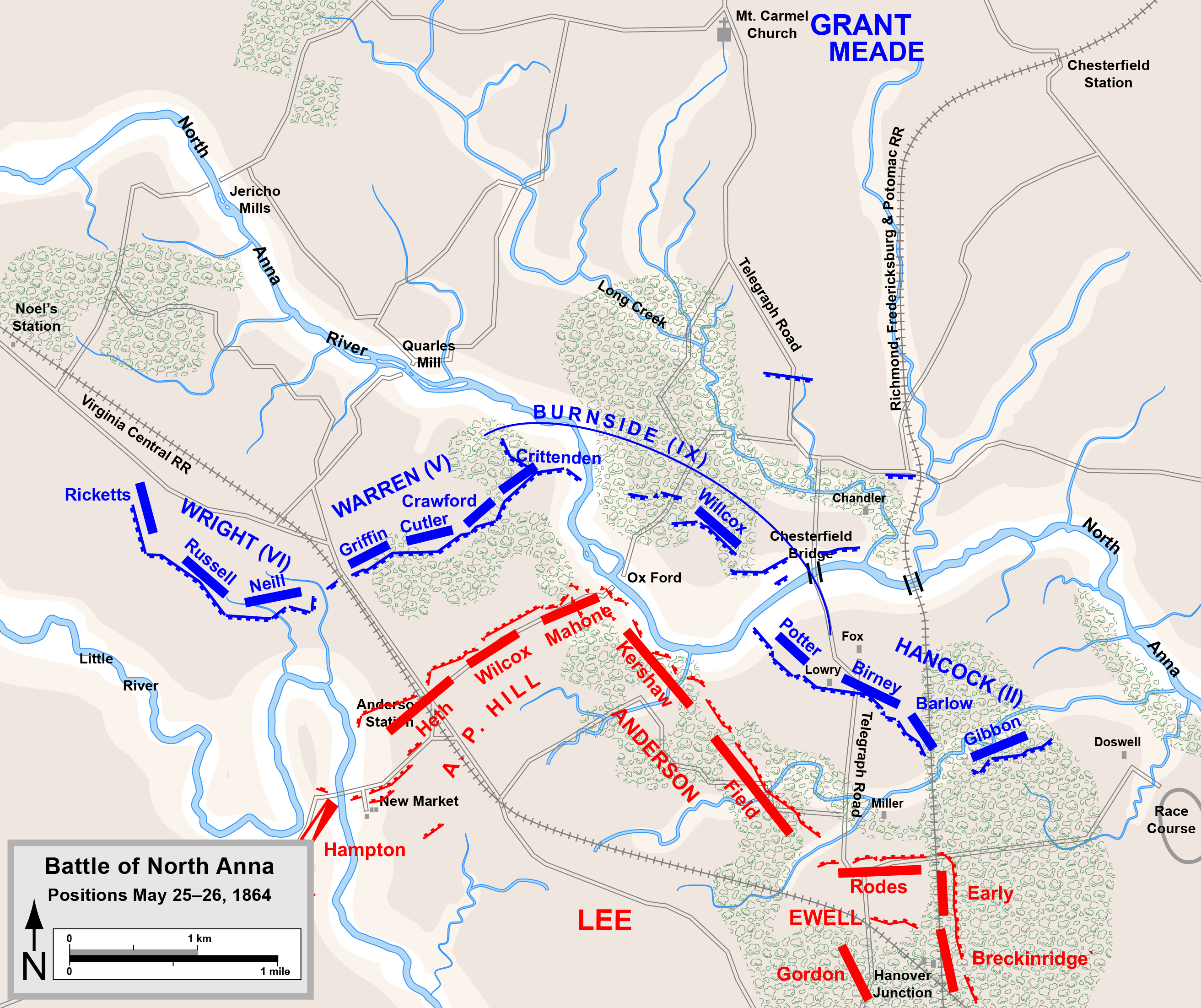
Stalemate: Union and Confederate positions May 25–26

=== Wilson's Wharf (May 24) ===
One of a series of protective outposts guarding supply lines for Union Maj. Gen. Benjamin Butler's Bermuda Hundred Campaign was a fort at Wilson's Wharf, at a strategic bend in the James River in eastern Charles City, overlooked by high bluffs. Its garrison of predominantly United States Colored Troops (USCT) under Brig. Gen. Edward A. Wild had a frightening reputation among Southerners. His soldiers freed and recruited slaves and in one case whipped a plantation owner who had a reputation for harshness to his slaves. The Richmond newspapers denounced these activities and put intense pressure on the government of Jefferson Davis to put a stop to Wild's depredations. Fitzhugh Lee's cavalry division was ordered to "break up this nest and stop their uncivilized proceedings." Lee took 2,500 men and one cannon on a 40-mile march from Atlee's Station to reach Wilson's Wharf.

At 1:30 p.m. on May 24 Lee demanded the surrender of the garrison. He promised that the black soldiers would be taken to Richmond and treated as prisoners of war, but if they did not surrender, he would not be "answerable for the consequences." Wild and his men interpreted this to mean that some of the men would be returned to their former masters and others would be tried by state authorities for inciting insurrection. Wild sent back a written reply that said "We will try it" and told the two officers sent by Lee, "Take the fort if you can."

Brig. Gen. Williams C. Wickham's Confederate brigade moved east of the fort, while Col. John Dunovant of the 5th South Carolina Cavalry demonstrated on the western end of the fort. Dunovant's men advanced as far as the ditch and abatis, but were driven back by heavy fire. Wickham's men rushed forward across an open field and were met by interlocking fields of musket fire, canister rounds from two 10-pound Parrott rifles, and naval gunfire from the gunboat USS Dawn. Lee ordered his men to withdraw to Charles City Court House and the next morning they rode back to Atlee's Station.

Casualties were relatively light and the action had little effect on the outcome of the war, but the North scored a propaganda victory. It was the first significant combat encounter between the Army of Northern Virginia and black soldiers, who had fought well in a defensive battle against a larger attacking force. Southerners, unwilling to acknowledge their defeat against a predominantly African-American force, claimed that six gunboats and substantial numbers of white Union soldiers were involved in the action.

=== Across the Pamunkey (May 27–29) ===
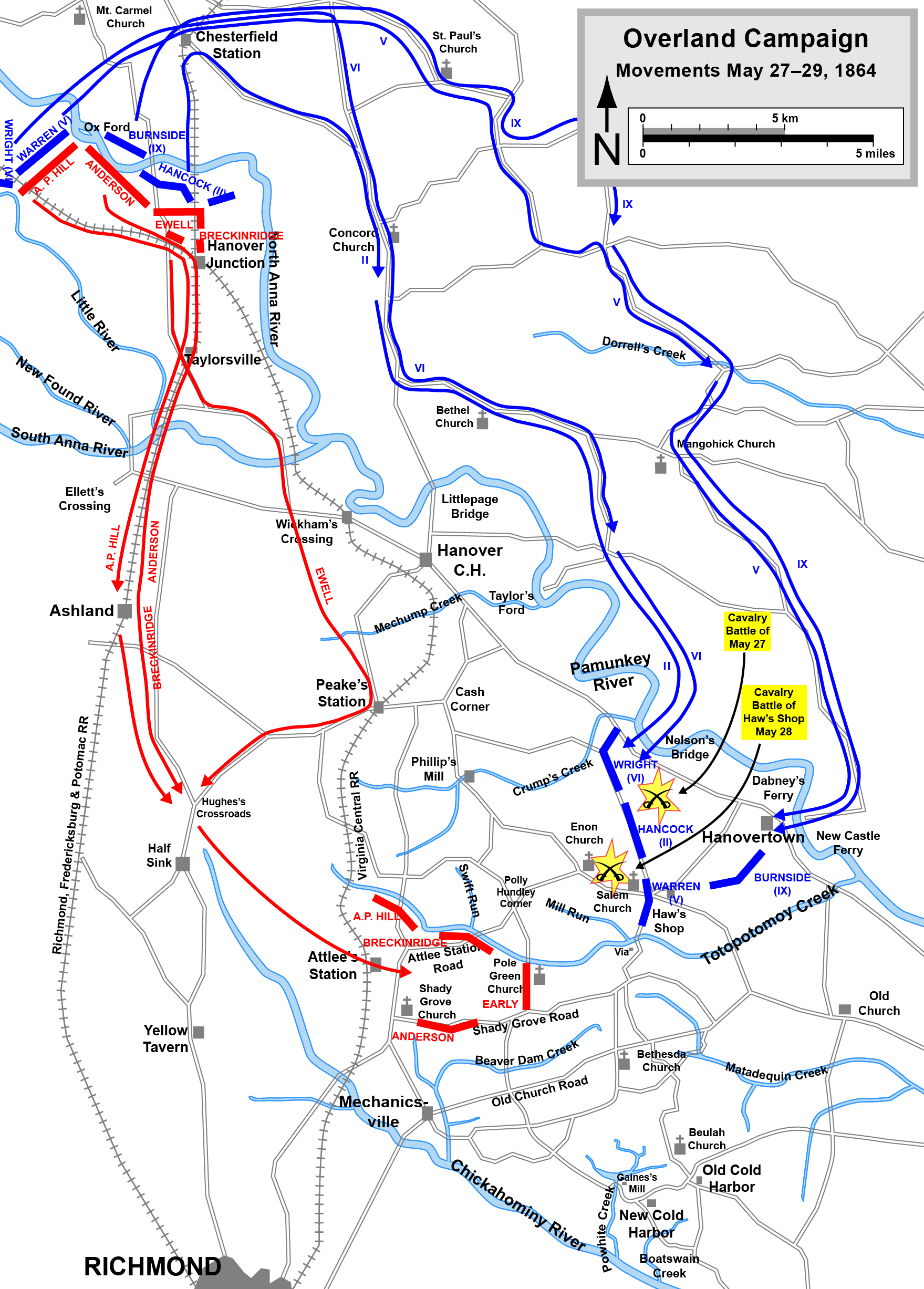
Movements in the Overland Campaign, May 27–29, 1864, following the Battle of North Anna

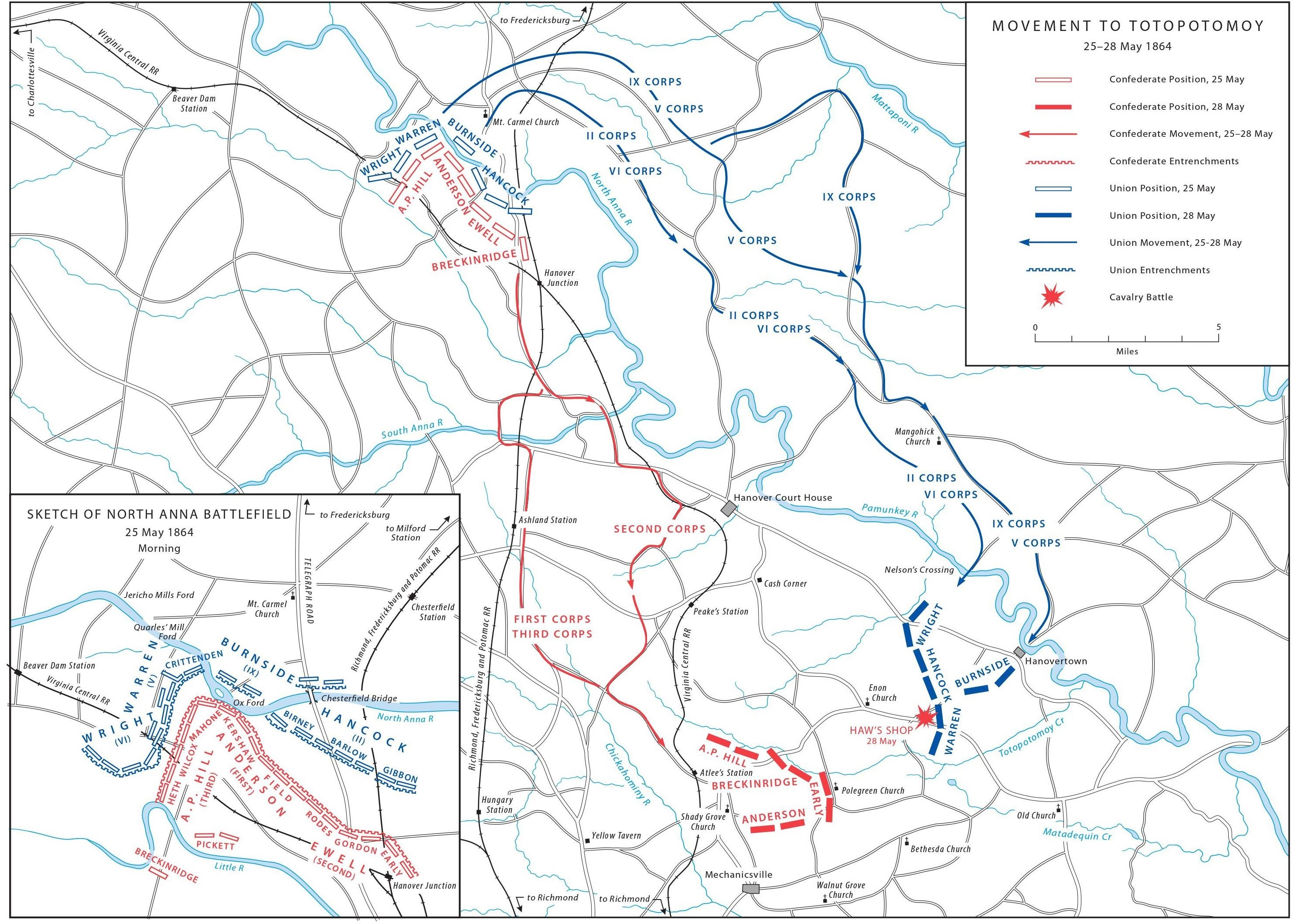
Movement to Totopotomoy, May 25–28, 1864, following the Battle of North Anna

As he did after the Wilderness and Spotsylvania, Grant now planned to leave the North Anna in another wide swing around Lee's flank, marching east of the Pamunkey River to screen his movements from the Confederates. He ordered (on May 22) that his supply depots at Belle Plain, Aquia Landing, and Fredericksburg be moved to a new base at Port Royal, Virginia, on the Rappahannock River. (Six days later the supply base was moved again, from Port Royal to White House on the Pamunkey.) If Grant had decided to move directly south, he would have been forced to cross three rivers, the Little River, the New Found, and the South Anna, minor obstacles that Lee would have to navigate instead.

Before he could move, however, Grant was faced with the problem of disengaging from Lee's army. Not only were the armies closely situated, Grant's first had to withdraw north over the North Anna, during which it would be very vulnerable to attack. Grant decided on a series of deceptive measures to disguise his intentions. On May 26, he sent a cavalry division under Brig. Gen. James H. Wilson to Little River, probing the western end of the Confederate line, while at the same time men from the cavalry divisions of Brig. Gens. Alfred T. A. Torbert and David McM. Gregg were sent to the Little Page Bridge and Taylor's Ford on the Pamunkey, 10 miles upriver from Grant's intended crossing points. Lee, who was still in his tent suffering from the diarrhea that had incapacitated him during the North Anna battle, was fooled by Grant's actions and assumed that the Union general would be moving west for the first time in the campaign.

The Union infantry withdrew stealthily after dark on May 26 and by the morning of May 27 all were safely north of the North Anna. Burnside's IX Corps and Hancock's II Corps stayed in place to guard the river crossings while Warren's V Corps and Wright's VI Corps, led by Sheridan's cavalry, began their march toward crossings near Hanovertown, about 34 miles to the southeast. Once Lee recognized that his opponent had departed, he moved his army swiftly in response. His three corps marched south along the Richmond, Fredericksburg, and Potomac Railroad, and then overland, heading for Atlee's Station on the Virginia Central Railroad, a point only 9 miles north of Richmond. There, his men would be well-positioned behind a stream known as Totopotomoy Creek to defend against Grant if he moved against the railroads or Richmond. He also sent a small brigade of North Carolina cavalry down the southern bank of the Pamunkey to scout and harass the Union advance wherever possible. During the march, Lee's illness forced him to ride in a carriage. Ewell was also laid up with a similar illness and rode in an ambulance. His condition was serious enough that he was temporarily replaced in command by Maj. Gen. Jubal Early.

On May 27, Union cavalry established a bridgehead over Dabney's Ford on the south side of the Pamunkey River. Brig. Gen. George A. Custer's Michigan cavalry brigade scattered the mounted Confederate pickets guarding the ford and an engineer regiment constructed a pontoon bridge. Custer's men fought a brisk engagement north of Salem Church against Confederate cavalry under Maj. Gen. Fitzhugh Lee, the 1st Maryland under Col. Bradley T. Johnson and the brigade of North Carolinians under Col. John A. Baker. The Confederates withdrew under the pressure of superior numbers. The rest of Torbert's division then crossed the river, followed by Gregg's cavalry division and a division of Union infantry.

Lee knew that his best defensive position against Grant would be the low ridge on the southern bank of Totopotomoy Creek, but he was not certain of Grant's specific plans. If Grant was not intending to cross the Pamunkey in force at Hanovertown, the Union army could outflank him and head directly to Richmond. Lee ordered cavalry under Maj. Gen. Wade Hampton to make a reconnaissance in force, break through the Union cavalry screen, and find the Union infantry.

=== Haw's Shop (May 28) ===
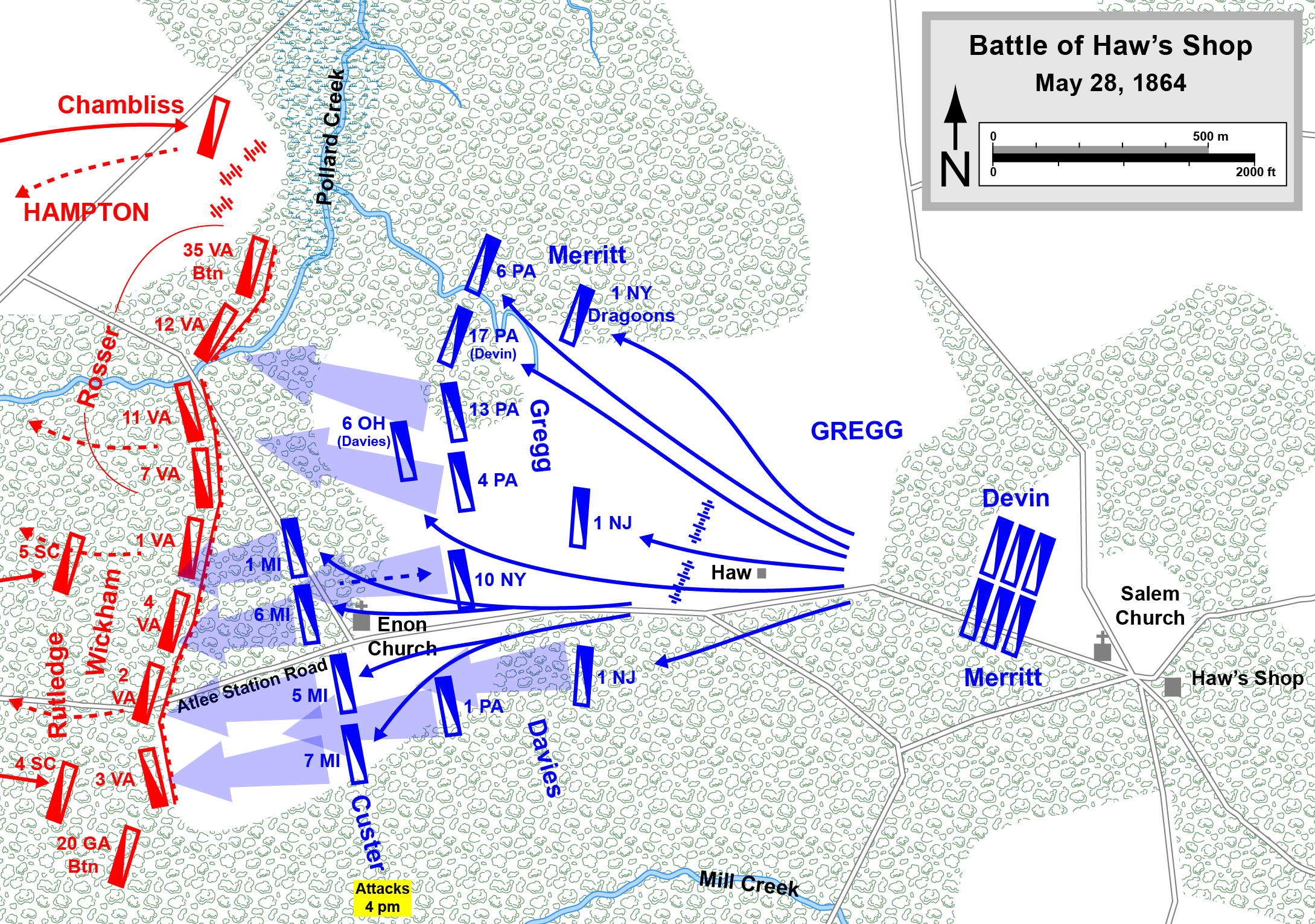
Battle of Haw's Shop

At 8 a.m. on May 28, Hampton rode off from Atlee's Station. As more of Grant's infantry crossed the pontoon bridge over the Pamunkey, Brig. Gen. David McM. Gregg led his cavalry division probing west from Hanovertown, searching for Lee, while Brig. Gen. Alfred T. A. Torbert's division began to picket along Crump's Creek in the direction of Hanover Court House. Three miles west of Hanovertown, and a mile beyond a large blacksmith shop called Haw's Shop, Gregg's troopers ran into Hampton at Enon Church, finding the Confederate cavalrymen dismounted in a wooded area, hurriedly erecting breastworks made of logs and rails, and well covered by artillery. Brig. Gen. Henry E. Davies Jr., deployed pickets from the 10th New York Cavalry to Hampton's front, but they were driven back. The Confederates deployed in line in shallow rifle pits faced with log and fence-rail breastworks. Before Hampton could attack the approaching Union cavalry, Col. J. Irvin Gregg's brigade arrived and moved to the right of Davies's men, extending his flank. A Confederate mounted charge, followed by dismounted troopers, was repulsed. Hampton fed in the green troops of the 4th South Carolina on his right and they met Davies's next charge with their longer range Enfield rifles, killing or wounding 256 men. Union return fire was heavy as well, because the troopers were armed with seven-shot Spencer repeating carbines.

As Davies's first attack ground to a halt and the attack of Irvin Gregg's brigade failed to dislodge the Confederates, David Gregg sent for reinforcements from Sheridan, who released two brigades from Torbert's division. Torbert's reserve brigade under Brig. Gen. Wesley Merritt extended Gregg's line to the right, thwarting a flanking maneuver attempted by Hampton with Chambliss's newly arrived brigade. There was plenty of infantry nearby that could have been called for reinforcements, with Hancock's II Corps dug in about one mile to the north, and there are disagreements between Sheridan's memoirs and historians about whether he asked for such reinforcements.

Torbert's other brigade, under Brig. Gen. George A. Custer, dismounted and deployed in a long, double-ranked line of battle, as if they were infantrymen. Custer inspired his men by staying mounted as he led them forward. Receiving heavy rifle and artillery fire, 41 of the Union cavalrymen fell in the attack. Meanwhile, a mistaken identification of some dismounted Union cavalrymen as infantry concerned Hampton and he gave the order to begin withdrawing. (Hampton had also just received intelligence from prisoners on the location of two Union corps that had crossed the Pamunkey, which meant that his reconnaissance mission had been successfully completed.) As the Confederate brigades withdrew, Custer took advantage of the situation by charging forward for a final attack. Davies's brigade joined the attack and the remaining Confederate line fell apart into a rout, but by nightfall Hampton's cavalry was safely west of Totopotomoy Creek.

The Battle of Haw's Shop lasted for over seven hours and was the bloodiest cavalry battle since Brandy Station in 1863. It was an unusual battle in comparison to previous cavalry engagements in the Eastern Theater because it was fought predominantly by dismounted cavalry, many of which were protected by earthworks. Both sides claimed victory. Sheridan bragged that his men had driven Hampton from the field and had again demonstrated their superiority over the Confederate cavalry. Hampton, however, had prevented Sheridan from learning the disposition of Lee's army while delaying the Union advance for seven hours, and General Lee received the valuable intelligence he had sought. He now knew that Grant had crossed the Pamunkey in force, although he was still unclear on the next steps that Grant might take and therefore waited for further developments.

=== Totopotomoy Creek/Bethesda Church (May 28–30) ===
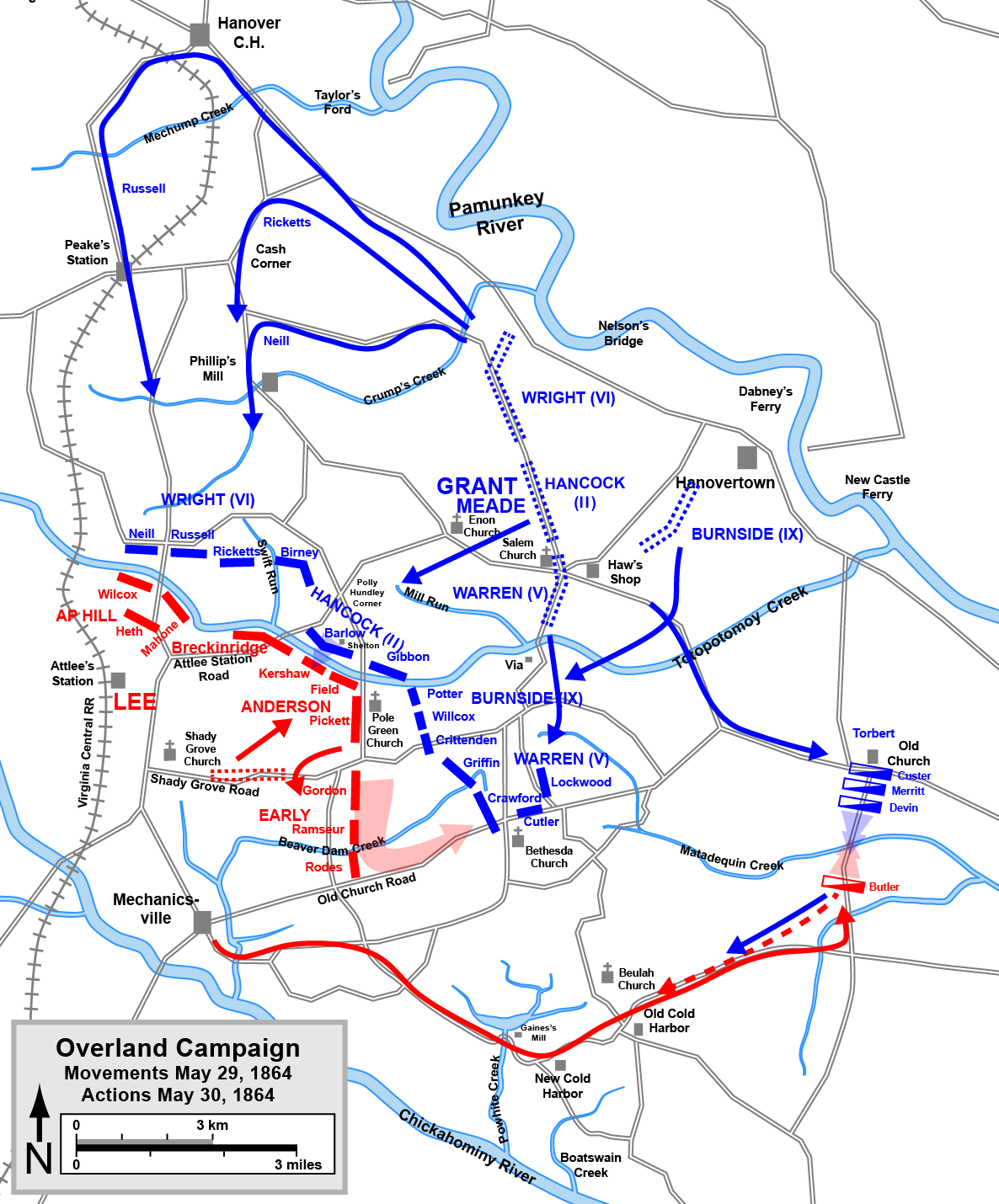
Movements in the Overland Campaign, May 29, and actions May 30, 1864

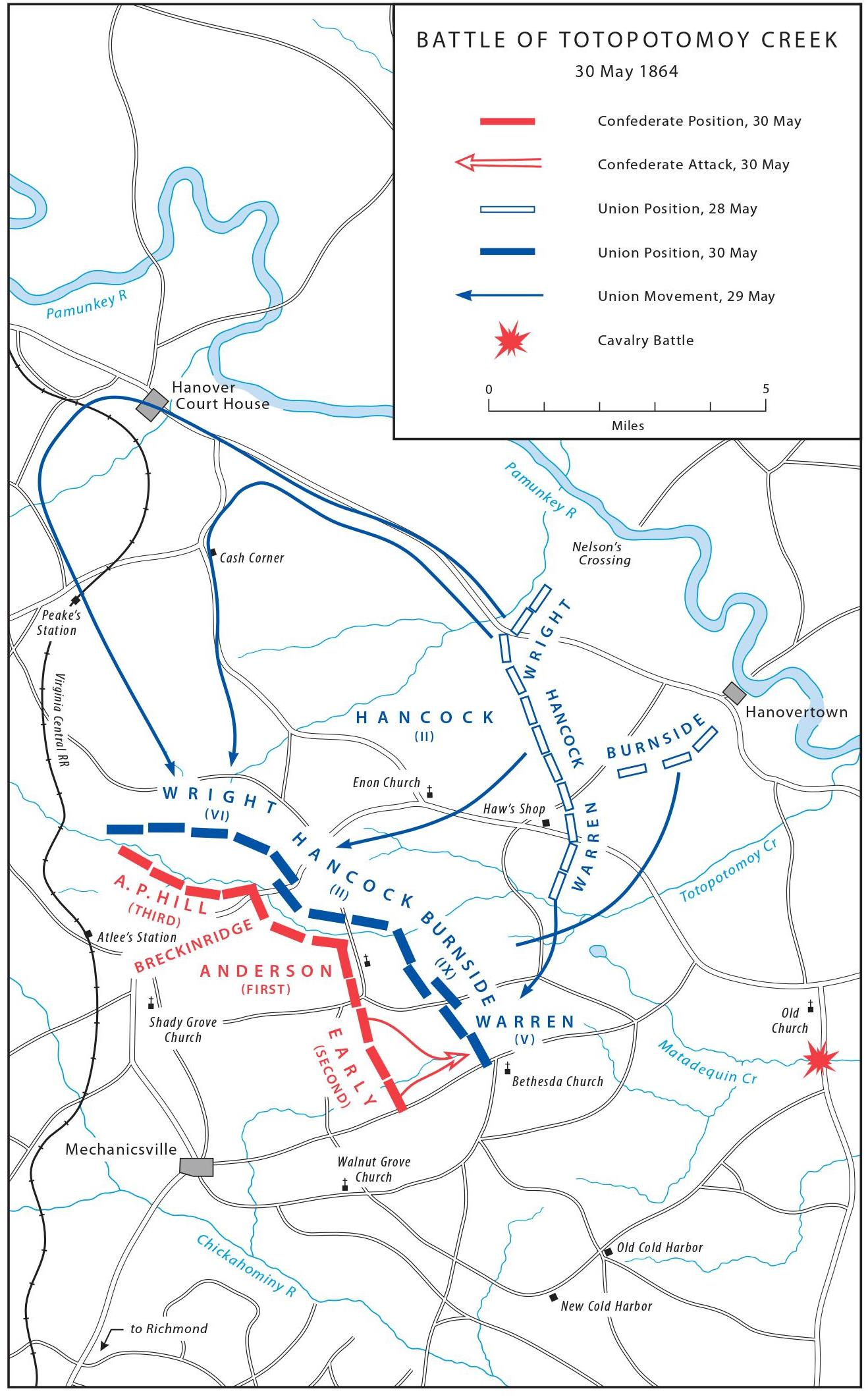
Battle of Totopotomoy Creek, May 30, 1864

As Lee's army stood in entrenchments behind Totopotomoy Creek, they were short on men. Lee requested that General P.G.T. Beauregard send him reinforcements from his 12,000-man army, sitting relatively idle as they bottled up Maj. Gen. Benjamin Butler's army at Bermuda Hundred. Beauregard initially refused Lee's request, citing the potential threat from Butler. Lee was determined despite this disappointment. He wrote to President Davis, "If General Grant advances tomorrow I will engage him with my present force."

On May 29, Grant's army advanced southwest to confront Lee. Since most of his cavalry was occupied elsewhere, he decided to use infantry for a reconnaissance in force. Hancock's II Corps followed the Richmond–Hanovertown Road (also known as Atlee Station Road) to Totopotomoy Creek. Finding that Lee was firmly entrenched on the far bank, Hancock's men began digging in. Warren's V Corps extended the II Corps line to the left. Wright's VI Corps was sent northwest from Hanovertown toward Hanover Court House. Burnside's IX Corps was in reserve near Haw's Shop and Sheridan's Cavalry Corps was far to the Union left, near Old Church. The Confederate line, from left to right, consisted of the corps of A.P. Hill, Breckinridge's independent division, and the corps of Anderson and Early. No action beyond minor skirmishing occurred during the day.

Grant began a general advance on May 30. Wright's corps was to move south against A.P. Hill on the Confederate left, while Hancock attacked across the creek against Breckinridge in the center, and Warren moved west toward Early along Shady Grove Road. Wright's advance became bogged down in the swampy land near Crump's Creek, delaying his VI Corps until late in the day. Hancock's skirmishers captured some of Breckinridge's rifle pits, but made little progress against the main Confederate line. Meade ordered Burnside's reserve corps to assist Hancock, but they arrived too late in the day to affect the battle. On the Union left, Warren moved the rest of his V Corps across the creek and began probing west. Lee ordered Early's corps, which was entrenched across Warren's path, to attack the V corps with the assistance of Anderson's corps. Early planned to send the division of Maj. Gen. Robert E. Rodes on a flanking march along Old Church Road, turning north at Bethesda Church, and following paths that his cavalry had precut through the underbrush to smash into Warren's rear areas.

As the V corps moved forward slowly, Warren became concerned about the safety of his left flank. He directed Crawford's division to move south along a farm track to Old Church Road, where they erected simple breastworks. Crawford sent forward the brigade of Col. Martin Davis Hardin, men of the Pennsylvania Reserves whose enlistments were due to expire that day. Rodes's men marched directly into Hardin's brigade at about noon and routed them. Crawford's entire division formation collapsed, exposing the V Corps' left flank. Unfortunately for the Confederates, Rodes lost control of his men, who ran beyond their objectives and descended into confusion. Warren began shifting his corps to face south toward Early.

Battle of Bethesda Church

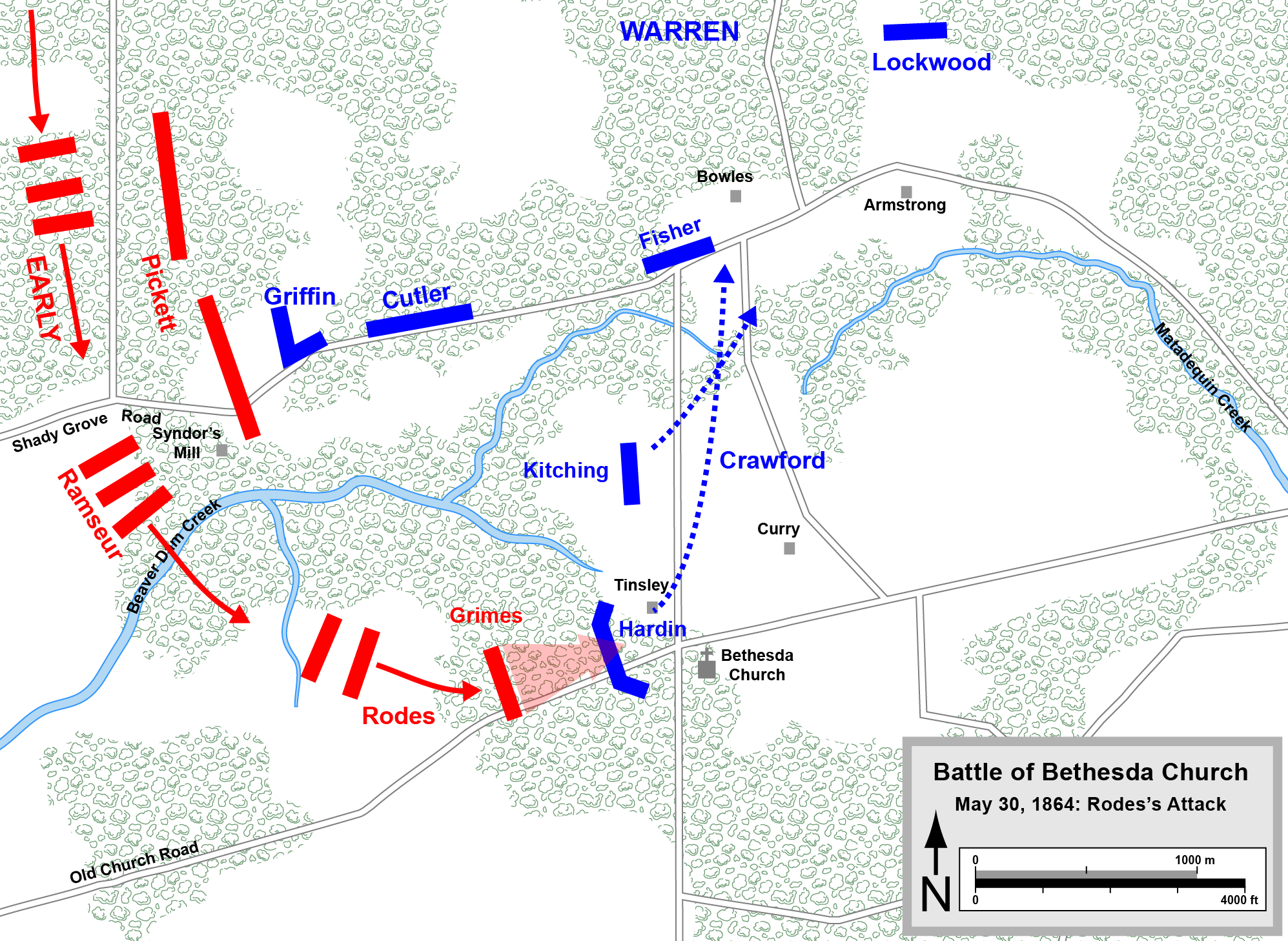
Rodes's attack

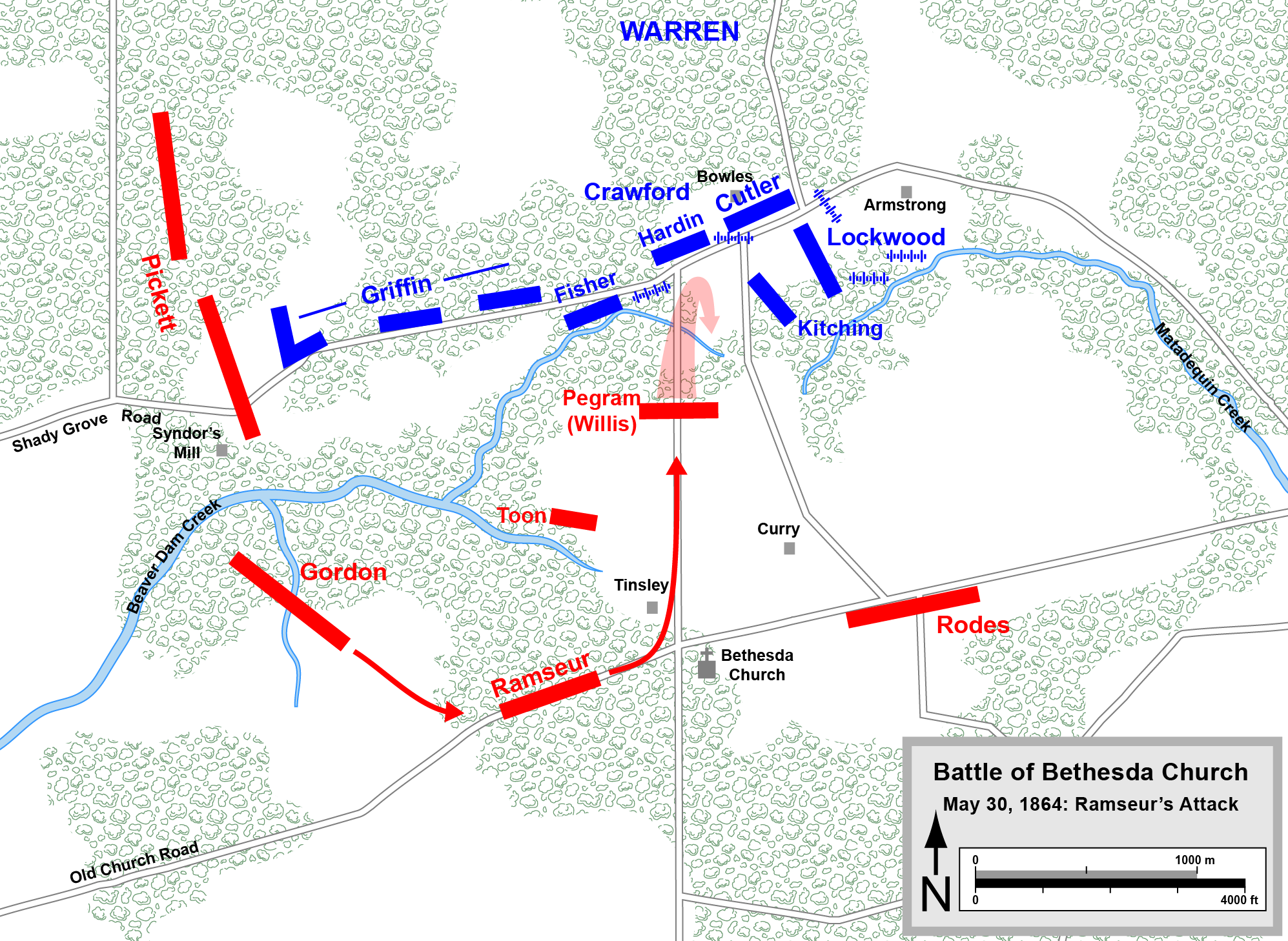
Ramseur's attack

Maj. Gen. Stephen Dodson Ramseur of Early's corps, newly promoted to division command, recklessly charged the Union artillery at 6:30 p.m. Gordon's division was still deploying and could not support the attack. Rodes's men were too occupied with protecting the Confederate right to assist. The only brigade that attacked was Pegram's, commanded by Col. Edward Willis. They advanced through a severe crossfire of rifle and cannon fire and were able to close within 50 yards of the Union position before Willis was mortally wounded and the brigade fell back to its starting point.

Meade ordered a general assault across the line to relieve pressure on Warren, but none of his corps commanders were in positions to comply immediately. However, Warren's men had extricated themselves from their predicament without additional assistance. The repulse of Ramseur's division discouraged Early and he ordered his corps to withdraw a short distance to the west. He blamed Anderson for not arriving in time to assist, but the soldiers blamed Ramseur, who had ordered the charge without sufficient reconnaissance.

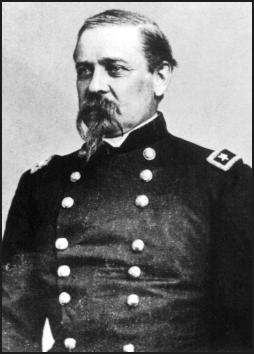
Maj. Gen. William F. "Baldy" Smith

Of more concern to Lee than Early's failed attack was intelligence he received that reinforcements were heading Grant's way. Just as Hoke's division was leaving Bermuda Hundred, the 16,000 men of Maj. Gen. William F. "Baldy" Smith's XVIII Corps were withdrawn from Butler's Army of the James at Grant's request and they were moving down the James River and up the York to the Pamunkey. If Smith moved due west from White House Landing to Cold Harbor, 3 miles southeast of Bethesda Church and Grant's left flank, the extended Federal line would be too far south for the Confederate right to contain it. Lee sent his cavalry under Fitzhugh Lee to secure the crossroads at Cold Harbor.

On May 31 Hancock's II Corps again crossed Totopotomoy Creek, but found that the Confederate defense line stood well behind the actual creek bed. Grant realized that the strength of the Confederate position meant another stalemate was at hand. He began shifting his army southward toward Cold Harbor on the night of May 31.

=== Old Church/Matadequin Creek (May 30) ===
As the infantry of the two armies fought at Bethesda Church on May 30, Sheridan began to receive requests for assistance from Warren, who was concerned that his isolated advanced position on the left flank of the Union army put him at risk. Sheridan initially paid little attention to Warren's requests because he still harbored ill feelings from arguments the two generals had had at Spotsylvania, but as Warren's requests became more urgent, Sheridan agreed to screen roads leading to Warren's left flank, assigning the task to his division under Brig. Gen. Alfred T. A. Torbert, who delegated the responsibility to the brigade of Col. Thomas C. Devin, which was encamped at the Old Church crossroads. He placed his brigade in a good defensible position on the north bank of Matadequin Creek and sent a squadron to a forward position at the Barker farm, south of the creek.

Meanwhile, unbeknownst to Sheridan, Lee was concerned about the critical road intersection at Old Cold Harbor, only six miles from Richmond. He dispatched Brig. Gen. Matthew C. Butler's brigade of 2,000 troopers from Mechanicsville to determine whether the intersection was threatened. At 3 p.m., an attack by Butler overwhelmed the Union pickets, who fought a vigorous delaying action to prevent the South Carolinians from crossing over the creek. Devin deployed three regiments in line, Butler two, with one in reserve.

Torbert ordered the rest of his division to move up. Brig. Gen. Wesley Merritt's reserve brigade was the first to arrive, and fought dismounted with the Confederates into a temporary stalemate. The stalemate was broken by the arrival of the Union brigade under Brig. Gen. George A. Custer. His attack flanked the Confederates on both ends of the line. As Butler's men fled to the rear, his reserve regiment, the 7th South Carolina, counterattacked in an attempt to maintain the line. The superior Union numbers and firepower—the Michiganders were armed with Spencer repeating rifles—carried the day. The Union troopers pursued the retreating Confederates with enthusiasm. Butler eventually rallied his men at Old Cold Harbor and Torbert's men bivouacked about 1.5 miles northeast of the intersection.

Although Butler had successfully gathered the information that Robert E. Lee needed, for the second time in three days—Haw's Shop and Matadequin Creek—the Confederate cavalry had been driven back by their Union counterparts, and in both cases Custer's brigade had provided the crucial force needed to prevail. The door was open for Sheridan's capture of the important Old Cold Harbor crossroads the next day.

=== Cold Harbor (May 31 – June 12) ===
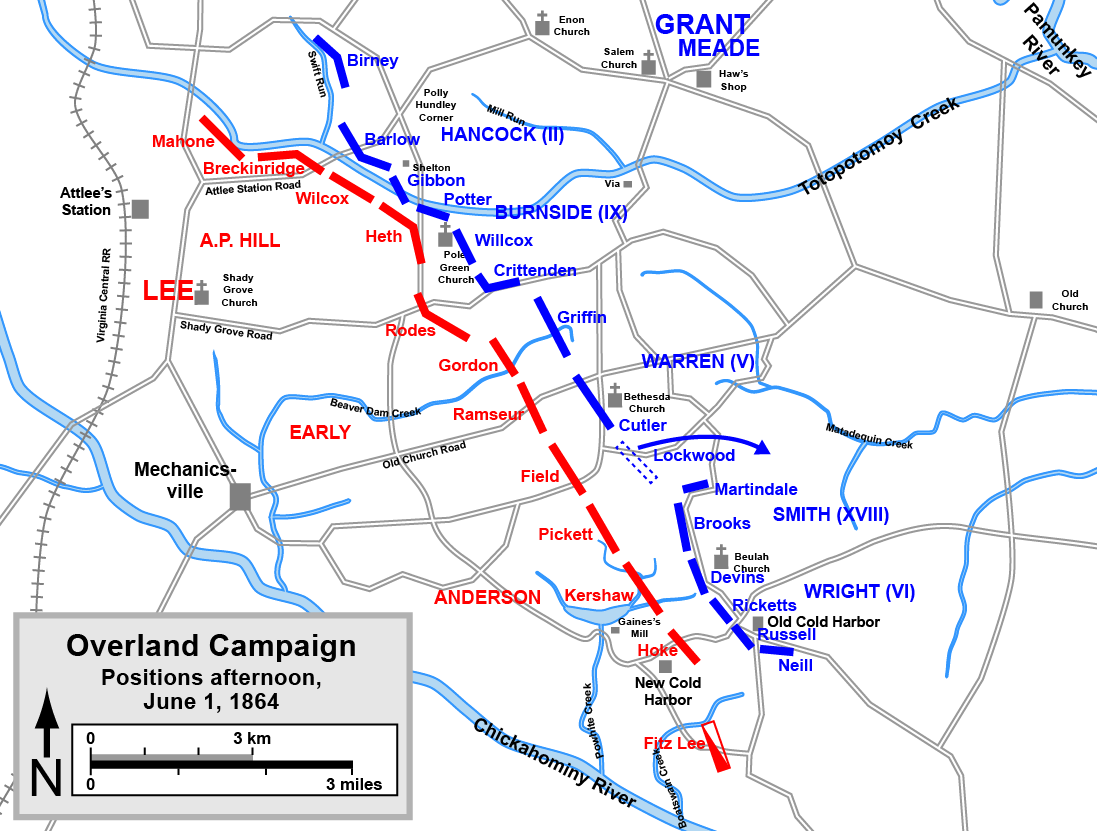
Positions of the armies on the afternoon of June 1, 1864

The cavalry forces that had fought at Old Church continued to face each other on May 31. Lee sent a cavalry division under Maj. Gen. Fitzhugh Lee to reinforce Butler and secure the crossroads at Old Cold Harbor and ordered Anderson's First Corps to shift right from Totopotomoy Creek to support the cavalry. The lead brigade of Hoke's division also reached the crossroads to join Butler and Fitzhugh Lee. At 4 p.m. Torbert and elements of Brig. Gen. David McM. Gregg's cavalry division drove the Confederates from the Old Cold Harbor crossroads and began to dig in. As more of Hoke's and Anderson's men streamed in, Union cavalry commander Maj. Gen. Philip Sheridan became concerned and ordered Torbert to pull back toward Old Church. Grant continued his interest in Old Cold Harbor as an avenue for Smith's arrival and ordered Wright's VI Corps to move in that direction from his right flank on Totopotomoy Creek, and he ordered Sheridan to return to the crossroads and secure it "at all hazards". Torbert returned at 1 a.m. and was relieved to find that the Confederates had failed to notice his previous withdrawal.

Robert E. Lee's plan for June 1 was to use his newly concentrated infantry against the small cavalry forces at Old Cold Harbor, but his subordinates did not coordinate correctly. Anderson did not integrate Hoke's division with his attack plan and left him with the understanding that he was not to assault until the First Corps' attack was well underway, because the Union defenders were disorganized as well. Wright's VI Corps had not moved out until after midnight and was on a 15-mile (24 km) march. Smith's XVIII Corps had mistakenly been sent to New Castle Ferry on the Pamunkey River, several miles away, and did not reach Old Cold Harbor in time to assist Torbert.

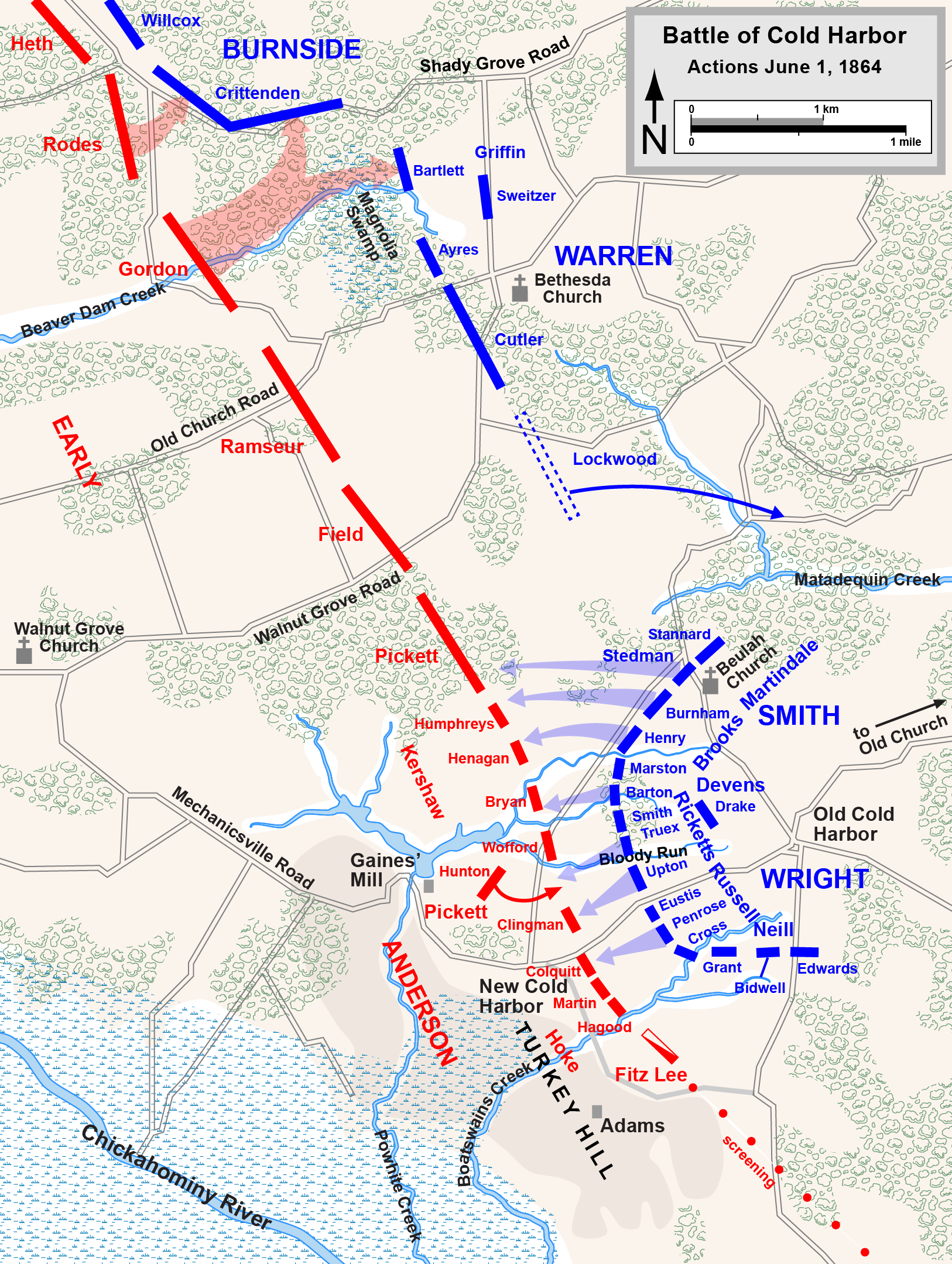
Cold Harbor, June 1

Anderson's attack was poorly coordinated and driven back by the heavy firepower of the Union cavalry's Spencer repeating carbines. By 9 a.m. Wright's lead elements arrived at the crossroads, but Wright decided to delay Grant's intended attack until after Smith arrived, which occurred in the afternoon, and the XVIII Corps men began to entrench on the right of the VI Corps. At 6:30 p.m. the attack that Grant had ordered for the morning finally began. Both Wright's and Smith's corps moved forward. Wright's men made little progress south of the Mechanicsville Road, recoiling from heavy fire. North of the road, Brig. Gen. Emory Upton's brigade also met with heavy fire from Brig. Gen. Thomas L. Clingman's brigade and fell back to its starting point. To Upton's right, the brigade of Col. William S. Truex found a gap in the Confederate line through a swampy, brush-filled ravine. As Truex's men charged through the gap, Clingman swung two regiments around to face them, and Anderson sent in Brig. Gen. Eppa Hunton's brigade from his corps reserve. Truex became surrounded on three sides and was forced to withdraw.

While action continued on the southern end of the battlefield, the three corps of Hancock, Burnside, and Warren were occupying a 5-mile line that stretched southeast to Bethesda Church, facing the Confederates under A.P. Hill, Breckinridge, and Early. At the border between the IX and V Corps, two divisions of Early's Corps—Maj. Gen. Robert E. Rodes on the left, Maj. Gen. John B. Gordon on the right—attacked at 7 p.m. Warren later described this attack as a "feeler", and despite some initial successes, both Confederate probes were repulsed.

Although the June 1 attacks had been unsuccessful, Meade believed that an attack early on June 2 could succeed if he was able to mass sufficient forces against an appropriate location. He and Grant decided to target Lee's right flank. Meade ordered Hancock's II Corps to shift southeast from Totopotomoy Creek and assume a position to the left of Wright's VI Corps. Once Hancock was in position, Meade would attack on his left from Old Cold Harbor with three Union corps in line, totaling 31,000 men: Hancock's II Corps, Wright's VI Corps, and Baldy Smith's XVIII Corps. Meade also ordered Warren and Burnside to attack Lee's left flank in the morning "at all hazards," convinced that Lee was moving troops from his left to fortify his right.

Hancock's men marched almost all night and arrived too worn-out for an immediate attack that morning. Grant agreed to let the men rest and postponed the attack until 5 p.m., and then again until 4:30 a.m. on June 3. But Grant and Meade did not give specific orders for the attack, leaving it up to the corps commanders to decide where they would hit the Confederate lines and how they would coordinate with each other. No senior commander had reconnoitered the enemy position. Robert E. Lee took advantage of the Union delays to bolster his defenses. When Hancock departed Totopotomoy Creek, Lee was free to shift Breckinridge's division to his far right flank. He also moved troops from A. P. Hill's Third Corps, the divisions of Brig. Gens. William Mahone and Cadmus M. Wilcox, to support Breckinridge, and stationed cavalry under Fitzhugh Lee to guard the army's right flank. The result was a curving line on low ridges, 7 miles (11 km) long, with the left flank anchored on Totopotomoy Creek, the right on the Chickahominy River, making any flanking moves impossible. Lee's engineers used their time effectively and constructed the "most ingenious defensive configuration the war had yet witnessed."

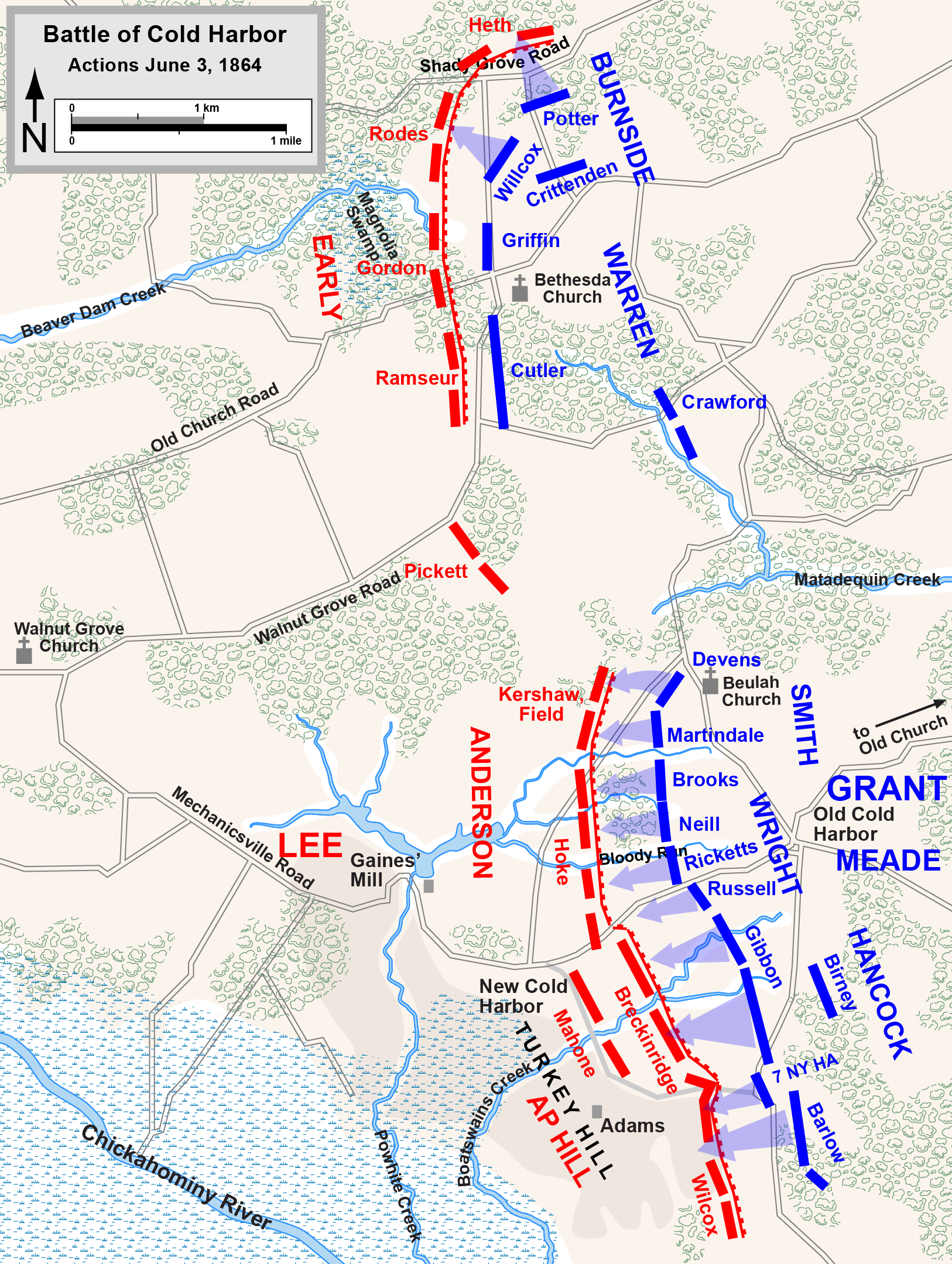
Cold Harbor, June 3

At 4:30 a.m. on June 3, the three Union corps began to advance through a thick ground fog. Massive fire from the Confederate lines quickly caused heavy casualties, and the survivors were pinned down. The most effective performance of the day was on the Union left flank, where Hancock's corps was able to break through a portion of Breckinridge's front line and drive those defenders out of their entrenchments in hand-to-hand fighting. However, nearby Confederate artillery turned the entrenchments into a death trap for the Federals. Breckinridge's reserves counterattacked these men from the division of Brig. Gen. Francis C. Barlow and drove them off. Hancock's other advanced division, under Brig. Gen. John Gibbon, became disordered in swampy ground and could not advance through the heavy Confederate fire. One of Gibbon's men, complaining of a lack of reconnaissance, wrote, "We felt it was murder, not war, or at best a very serious mistake had been made."

In the center, Wright's corps was pinned down by the heavy fire and made little effort to advance further, still recovering from their costly charge on June 1. On the Union right, Smith's men advanced through unfavorable terrain and were channeled into two ravines. When they emerged in front of the Confederate line, rifle and artillery fire mowed them down. The artillery fire against Smith's corps was heavier than might have been expected because Warren's V Corps to his right was reluctant to advance and the Confederate gunners in Warren's sector concentrated on Smith's men instead. The only activity on the northern end of the field was by Burnside's IX Corps, facing Jubal Early. He launched a powerful assault at 6 a.m. that overran the Confederate skirmishers but mistakenly thought he had pierced the first line of earthworks and halted his corps to regroup before moving on, which he planned for that afternoon.

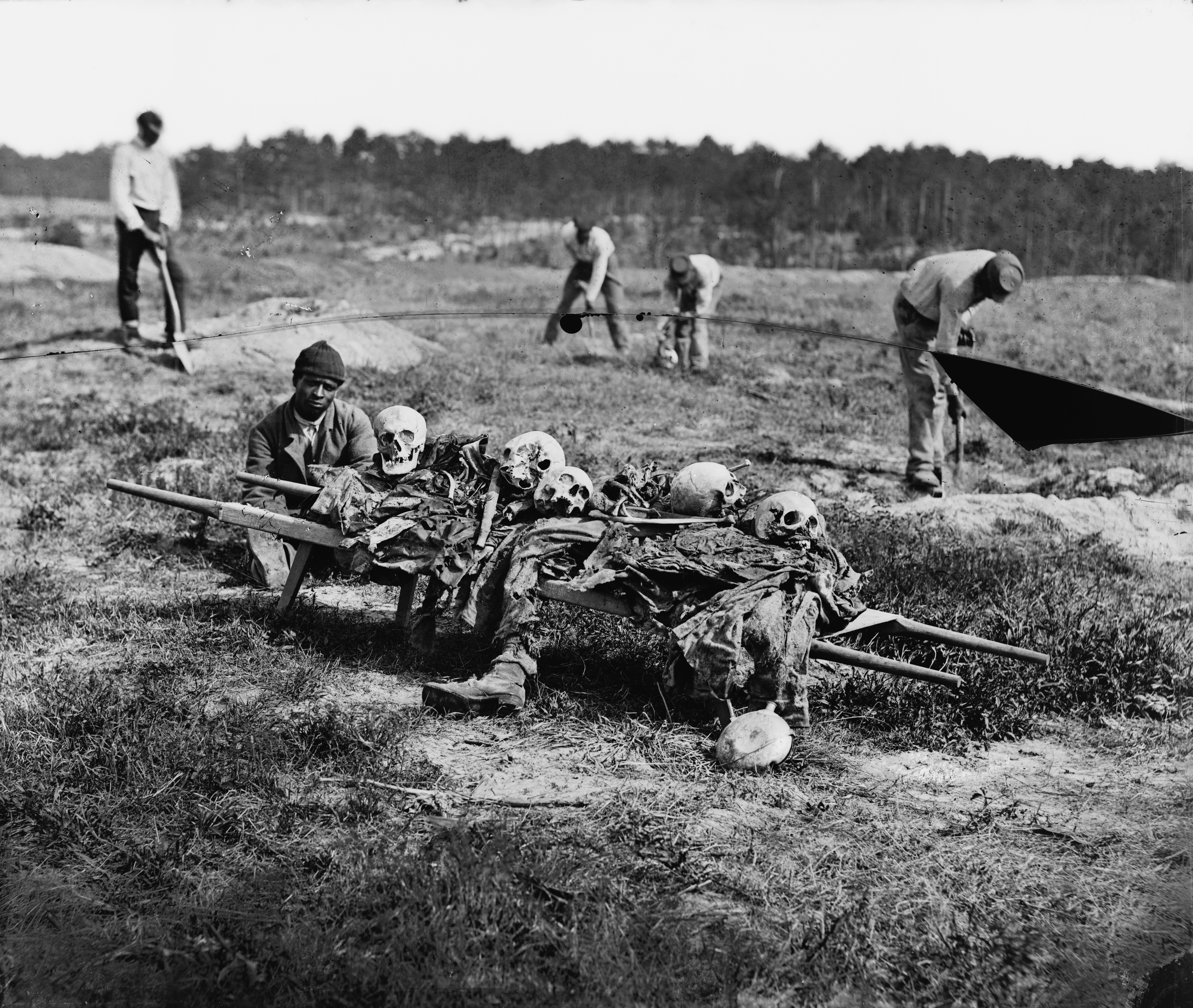
Cold Harbor, Virginia. African Americans collecting bones of soldiers killed in the battle. Photo by John Reekie, April 1865.

At 7 a.m. Grant advised Meade to vigorously exploit any successful part of the assault. Meade ordered his three corps commanders on the left to assault at once, without regard to the movements of their neighboring corps. But all had had enough. Hancock advised against the move. Smith, calling a repetition of the attack a "wanton waste of life," refused to advance again. Wright's men increased their rifle fire but stayed in place. By 12:30 p.m. Grant conceded that his army was done. He wrote to Meade, "The opinion of the corps commanders not being sanguine of success in case an assault is ordered, you may direct a suspension of further advance for the present." Estimates of casualties that morning are from 3,000 to 7,000 on the Union side, no more than 1,500 on the Confederate.

Grant and Meade launched no more attacks on the Confederate defenses at Cold Harbor. Although Grant wired Washington that he had "gained no decisive advantage" and that his "losses were not severe," he wrote in his Personal Memoirs that he regretted for the rest of his life the decision to send in his men. The two opposing armies faced each other for nine days of trench warfare, in some places only yards apart. The trenches were hot, dusty, and miserable, but conditions were worse between the lines, where thousands of wounded Federal soldiers suffered horribly without food, water, or medical assistance. Grant was reluctant to ask for a formal truce that would allow him to recover his wounded because that would be an acknowledgment he had lost the battle. He and Lee traded notes across the lines from June 5 to June 7 without coming to an agreement, and when Grant formally requested a two-hour cessation of hostilities, it was too late for most of the unfortunate wounded, who were now bloated corpses. Grant was widely criticized in the Northern press for this lapse of judgment.

=== Crossing the James (June 12–18) ===
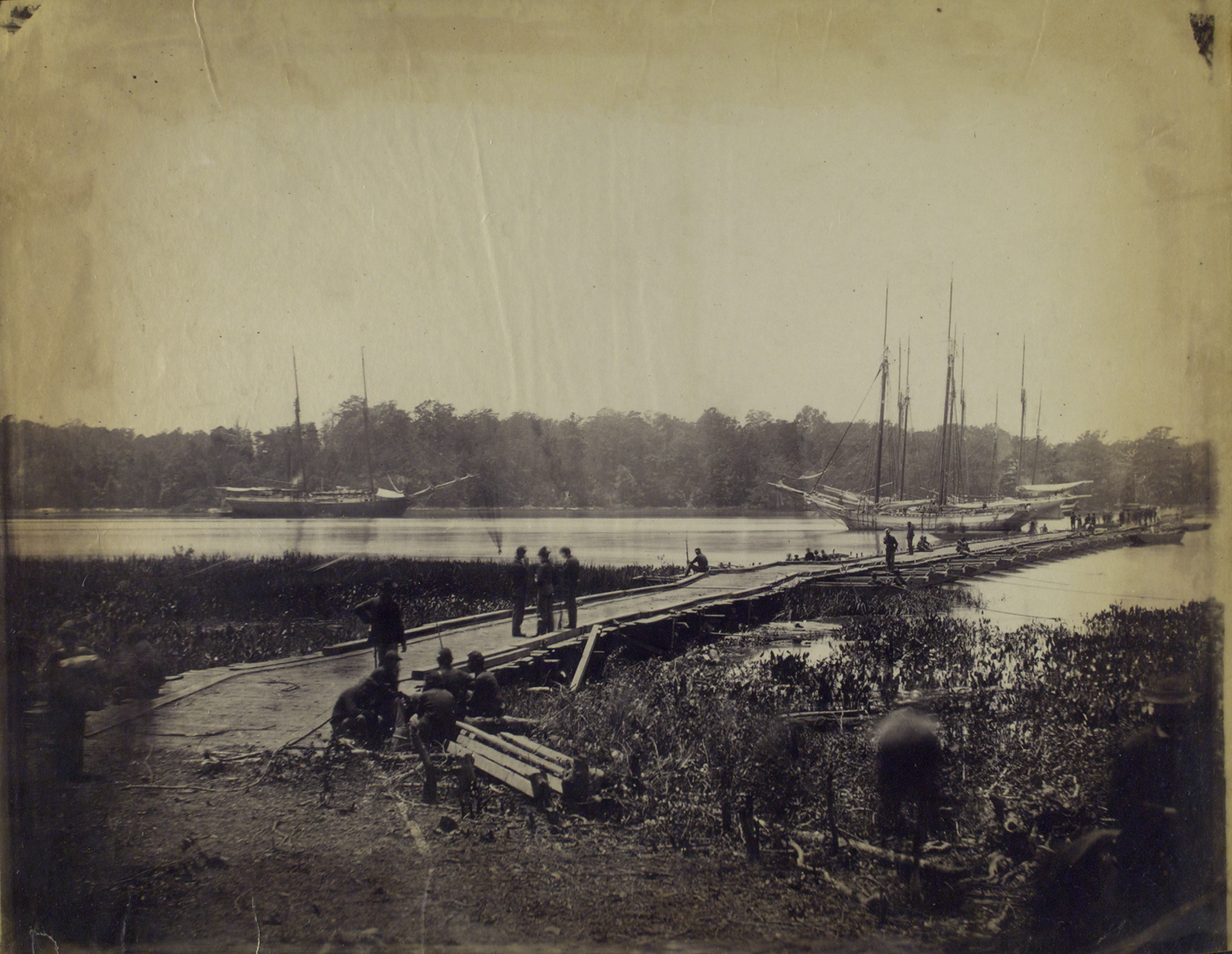
Pontoon bridge across the James River

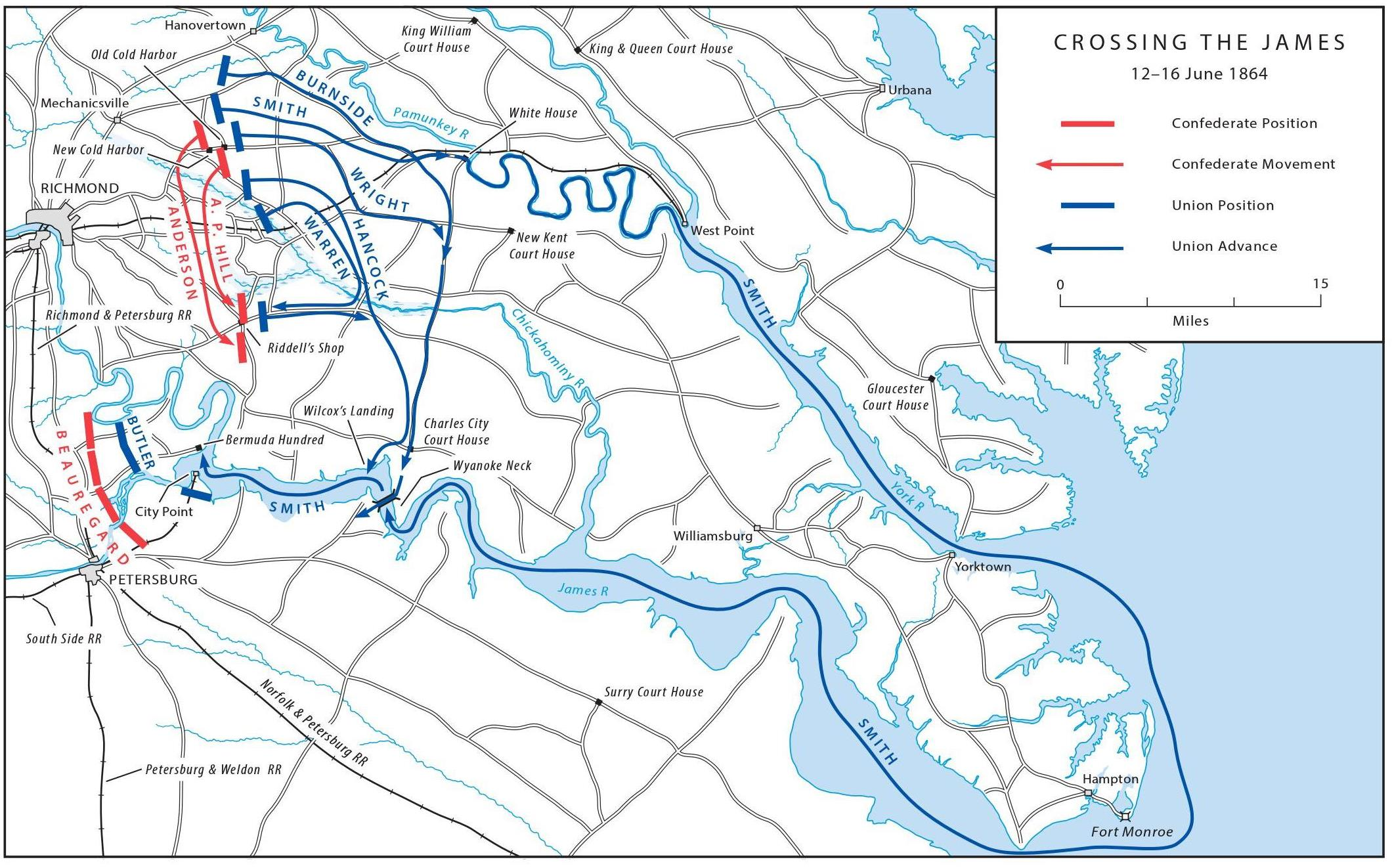
Crossing the James River, 12–16 June 1864.

Grant realized he was again in a stalemate with Lee and additional assaults at Cold Harbor were not the answer. He planned three actions to make some headway. First, in the Shenandoah Valley, Maj. Gen. David Hunter was making progress against Confederate forces, and Grant hoped that by interdicting Lee's supplies, the Confederate general would be forced to dispatch reinforcements to the Valley. Second, on June 7 Grant dispatched his cavalry under Sheridan to destroy the Virginia Central Railroad near Charlottesville. Third, he planned a stealthy operation to withdraw from Lee's front and move across the James River. He planned to cross to the south bank of the river, bypassing Richmond, and isolate the capital by seizing the railroad junction of Petersburg to the south. Lee reacted to the first two actions as Grant had hoped. He pulled Breckinridge's division from Cold Harbor and sent it toward Lynchburg to parry Hunter. By June 12 he followed this by assigning Jubal Early permanent command of the Second Corps and sending them to the Valley as well. And he sent two of his three cavalry divisions in pursuit of Sheridan, leading to the Battle of Trevilian Station.

On June 9, Meade ordered the construction of a new line of entrenchments in the army's rear, extending northward from Elder Swamp to Allen's Mill Pond. On June 11, the construction was complete and he issued orders for a movement to the James River, beginning after dark on June 12. (Also on June 11, Lee ordered Early's Second Corps to depart for Charlottesville, likewise on June 12.) As night fell on June 12, Hancock's II Corps and Wright's VI Corps took up positions on the new entrenchment line. Warren's V Corps cleared the roads heading south, advancing over Long Bridge and White Oak Swamp Bridge, taking up a blocking position just east of Riddell's Shop, facing toward Richmond while Burnside's IX Corps and Smith's XVIII Corps withdrew from the original line of entrenchments. The cavalry brigade of Col. George H. Chapman, part of Brig. Gen. James H. Wilson's division, which did not accompany Sheridan on his raid, screened the roads heading toward Richmond. Burnside headed south, followed by Wright and Hancock. Smith's XVIII Corps marched to White House, where on the morning of June 13 they embarked on steamers for Bermuda Hundred. They arrived at Point of Rocks on the Appomattox River the night of June 14.

While Lee remained unaware of Grant's intentions, Union army engineers constructed the longest pontoon bridge of the war. It stretched 2,200 feet (670 m) over deep water, crossing the James from Weyanoke to Windmill Point at Flowerdew Hundred. Work started at 4 p.m. on June 15 and was completed seven hours later. Although most of Grant's infantry crossed the river by boats, the IX Corps, one division of VI Corps, the animals and supply wagons, and a part of the artillery crossed on the bridge on June 15 and 16. By the morning of June 17, more than 100,000 men, 5,000 wagons and ambulances, 56,000 horses and mules, and 2,800 head of cattle had crossed the river without alerting the Confederates. Before the entire army had crossed, Smith's XVIII Corps, followed by Hancock's II Corps, became engaged in the next campaign (the Siege of Petersburg), with failed attacks on that city from June 15 to 18.

=== Trevilian Station (June 11–12) ===
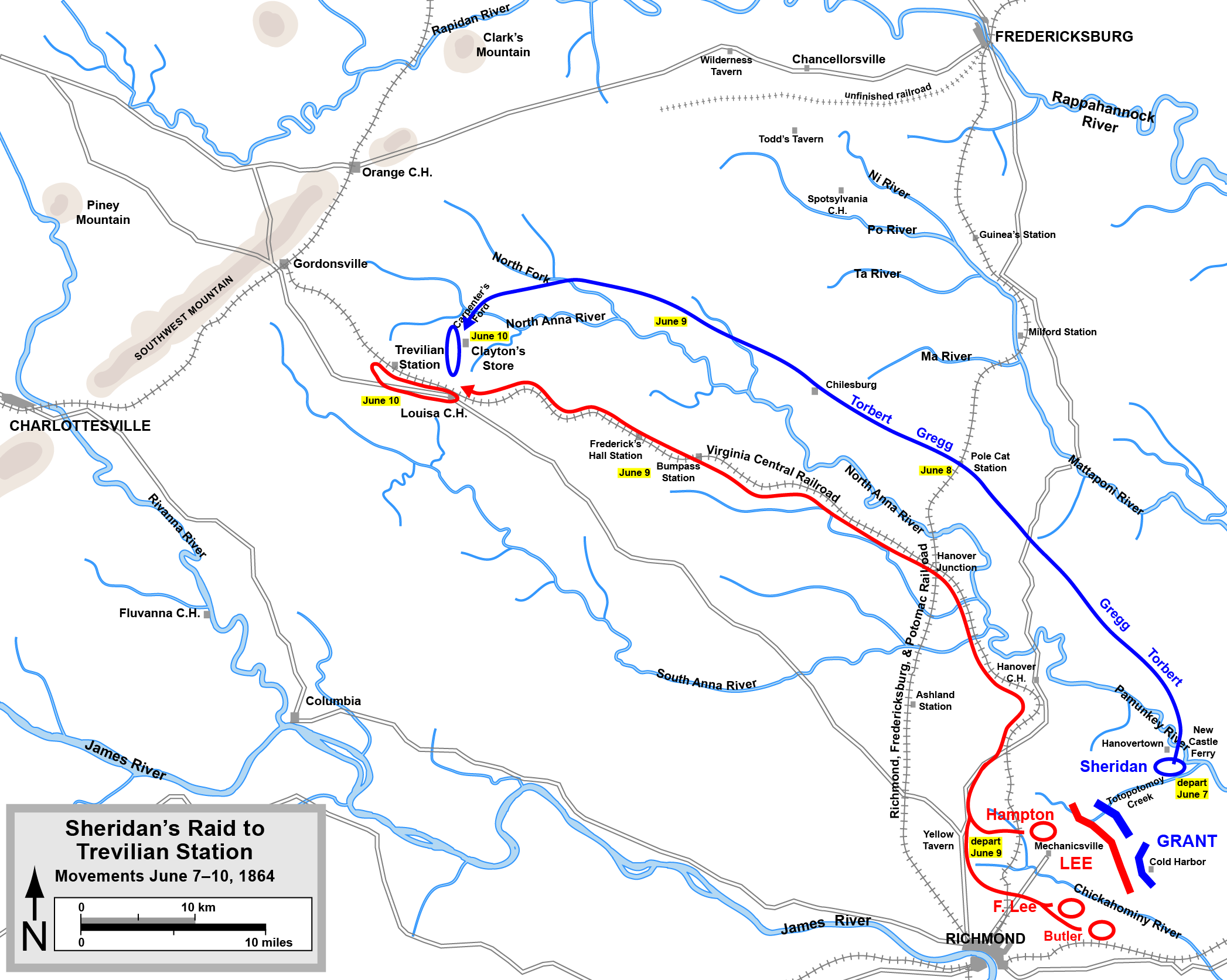
Routes of Federal and Confederate cavalry to Trevilian Station, June 7–10, 1864

Sheridan and two cavalry divisions left on June 7 for their raid against the Virginia Central Railroad and to link up with Hunter. In the first two days, plagued by heat and humidity, and by irregular mounted raiding parties, the Federal column advanced only about 40 miles. Scouts passed word of Sheridan's movements to Maj. Gen. Wade Hampton, the senior Confederate cavalry commander, on the morning of June 8. He correctly guessed that the Union targets were the railroad junctions at Gordonsville and Charlottesville, and knew that he would have to move quickly to block the threat. His division and the division of Maj. Gen. Fitzhugh Lee began to move in pursuit early on June 9. Although the Federals had a two-day head start, the Confederates had the advantage of a shorter route (about 45 miles versus 65) and terrain that was more familiar to them. By the evening of June 10, both forces had converged around Trevilian Station. The Federals had crossed over the North Anna River at Carpenters Ford and camped at locations around Clayton's Store.

At dawn on June 11, Hampton devised a plan in which he would split his divisions across the two roads leading to Clayton's Store and converge on the enemy at that crossroads, pushing Sheridan back to the North Anna River. Hampton took two of his brigades with him from Trevilian with his third remaining on his left to prevent flanking. The other division, under Fitzhugh Lee, was ordered to advance from Louisa Court House, making up the right flank. While the Confederates began their advance, Sheridan started his. Two brigades of Brig. Gen. Alfred T. A. Torbert's division moved down the road to Trevilian Station while a third advanced toward Louisa Court House. The first contact occurred on the Trevilian Road as the South Carolinians of Brig. Gen. Matthew C. Butler's brigade clashed with Brig. Gen. Wesley Merritt's skirmish line. Hampton dismounted his men and pushed the skirmishers back into the thick woods, expecting Fitzhugh Lee to arrive on his right at any minute. However, Hampton was severely outnumbered and soon he was forced back. Eventually Col. Gilbert J. Wright's Confederate brigade joined in the close-quarter fighting in the thick brush, but after several hours they also were pushed back within sight of Trevilian Station.

After a brief clash on the Confederate right flank between Fitzhugh Lee and the advancing brigade of Brig. Gen. George A. Custer, Custer led his brigade on a road southwest to Trevilian Station. He found the station totally unguarded, occupied only by Hampton's trains—supply wagons, caissons containing ammunition and food, and hundreds of horses. The 5th Michigan Cavalry captured the lot, but left Custer cut off from Sheridan, and in their pursuit of the fleeing wagons, lost a number of their own men and much of their bounty. One of Wright's regiments, the 7th Georgia, got between Custer's force and Trevilian Station. Custer ordered the 7th Michigan to charge, driving the Georgians back. Hampton now learned of the threat in his rear area and sent in three brigades. Suddenly Custer was virtually surrounded, his command in an ever-shrinking circle, as every side was charged and hit with shells. Sheridan heard the firing from Custer's direction and realized he needed help. He charged with two brigades, pushing Hampton's men back all the way to the station, while a third brigade swung into Fitzhugh Lee's exposed right flank, thus pushing him back. Hampton fell back to the west, Lee to the east, and the battle ended for the day with the Federals in possession of Trevilian Station.

That night, Fitzhugh Lee maneuvered south to link up with Hampton to the west of Trevilian Station. Sheridan learned that General Hunter was not headed for Charlottesville as originally planned, but to Lynchburg. He also received intelligence that Breckinridge's infantry had been sighted near Waynesboro, effectively blocking any chance for further advance, so he decided to abandon his raid and return to the main army at Cold Harbor.

On June 12, the Union cavalry destroyed Trevilian Station, several railcars, and about a mile of track on either side of the station. Concerned about the Confederates hovering near his flank, at about 3 p.m. Sheridan sent Torbert's division on a reconnaissance west on the Gordonsville and Charlottesville roads. They found Hampton's entire force in an L-shaped line behind some log breastworks two miles northwest of Trevilian. The Union cavalrymen launched seven assaults against the apex and shorter leg of the "L", but were repulsed with heavy losses. Two brigades of Fitzhugh Lee's division swung around to hit the Union right flank with a strong counterattack. The battle ended about 10 p.m. and the Union withdrew late in the night. It had been the bloodiest and largest all-cavalry engagement of the war. Sheridan, burdened with many wounded men, about 500 prisoners, and a shortage of ammunition, decided to withdraw. He planned a leisurely march back to Cold Harbor, knowing that Hampton would be obliged to follow and would be kept occupied for days, unavailable in that time to Robert E. Lee.

Battle of Trevilian Station

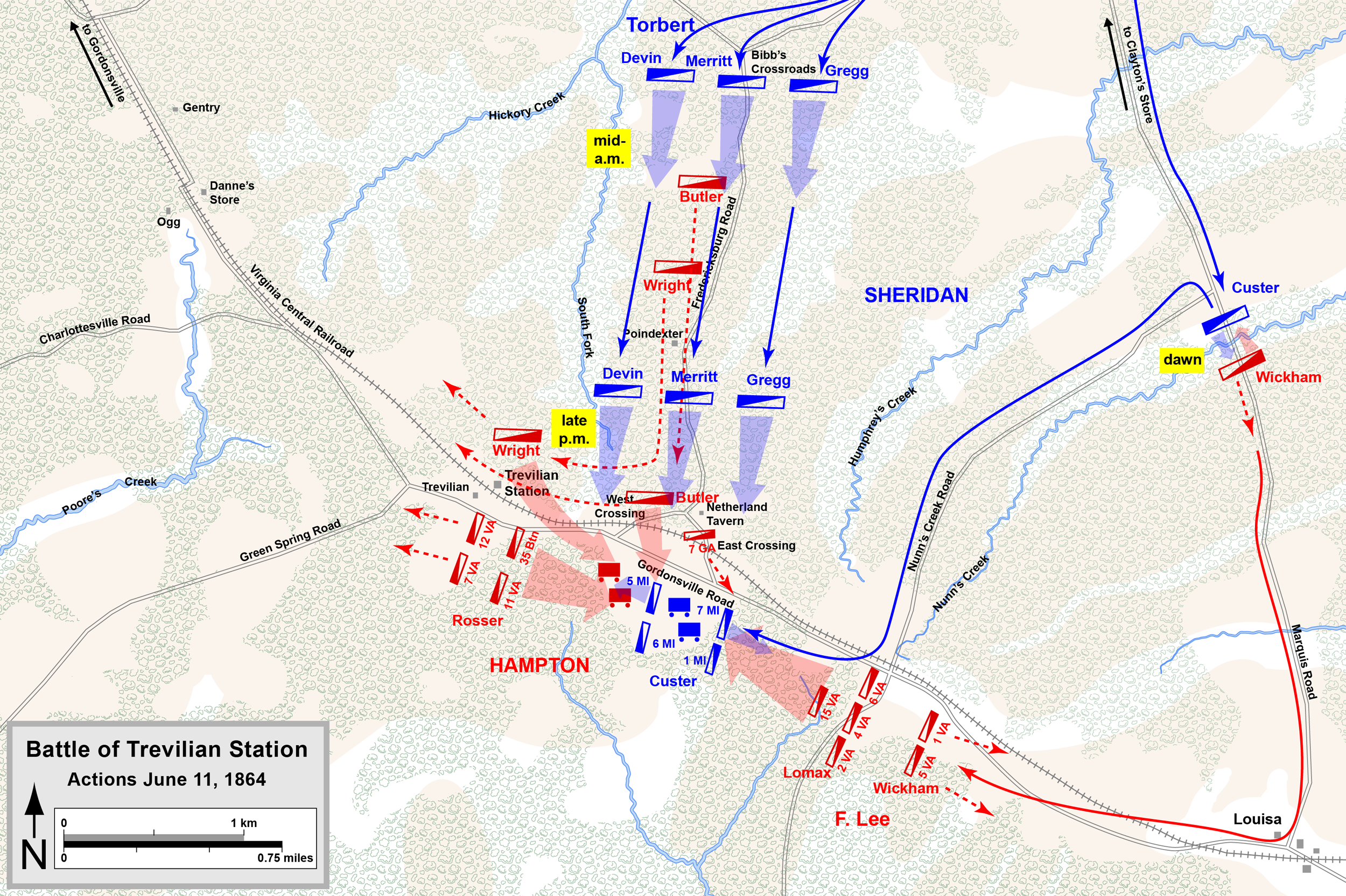
Actions on June 11

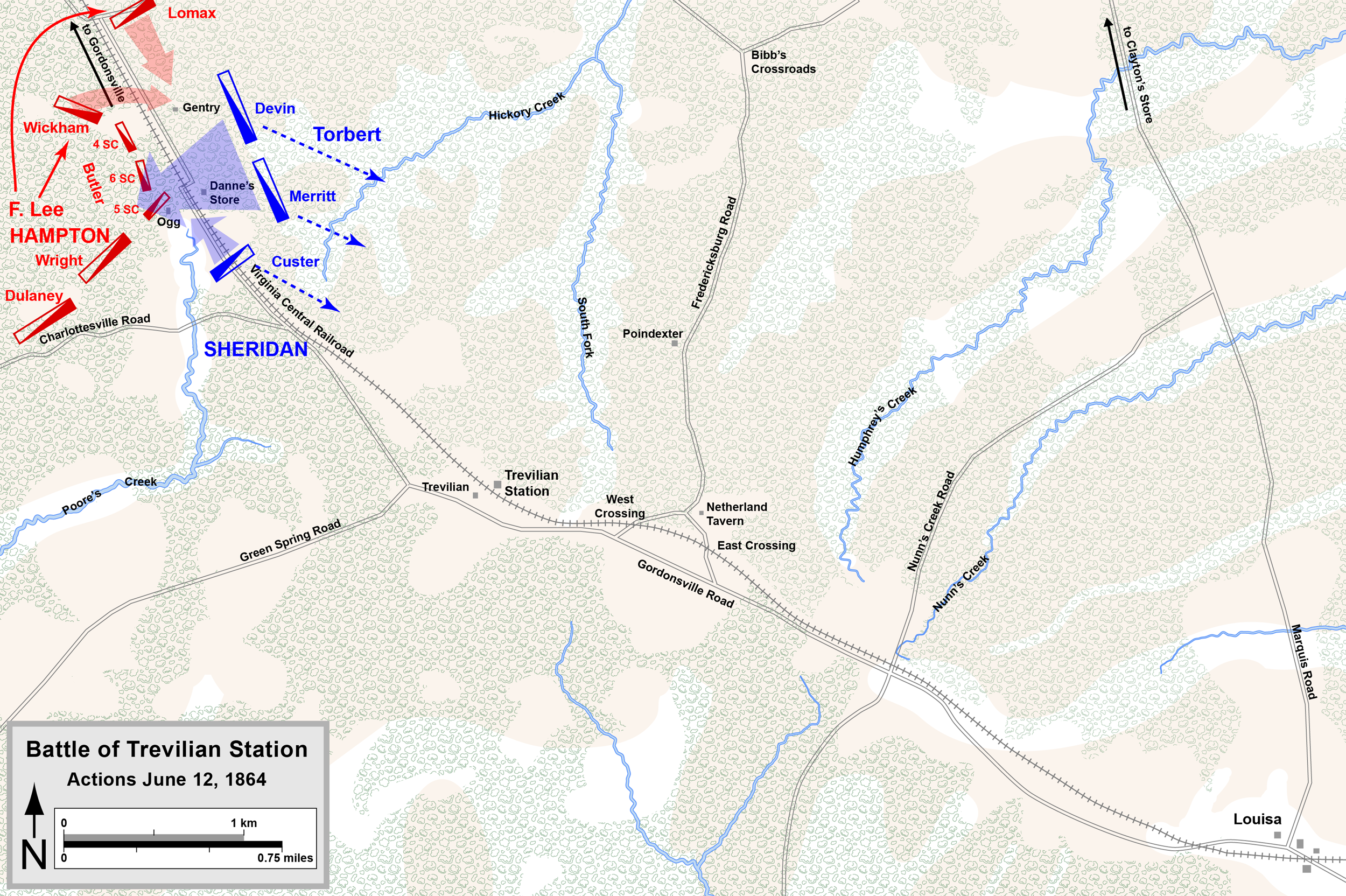
Actions on June 12

=== Saint Mary's Church (June 24) ===
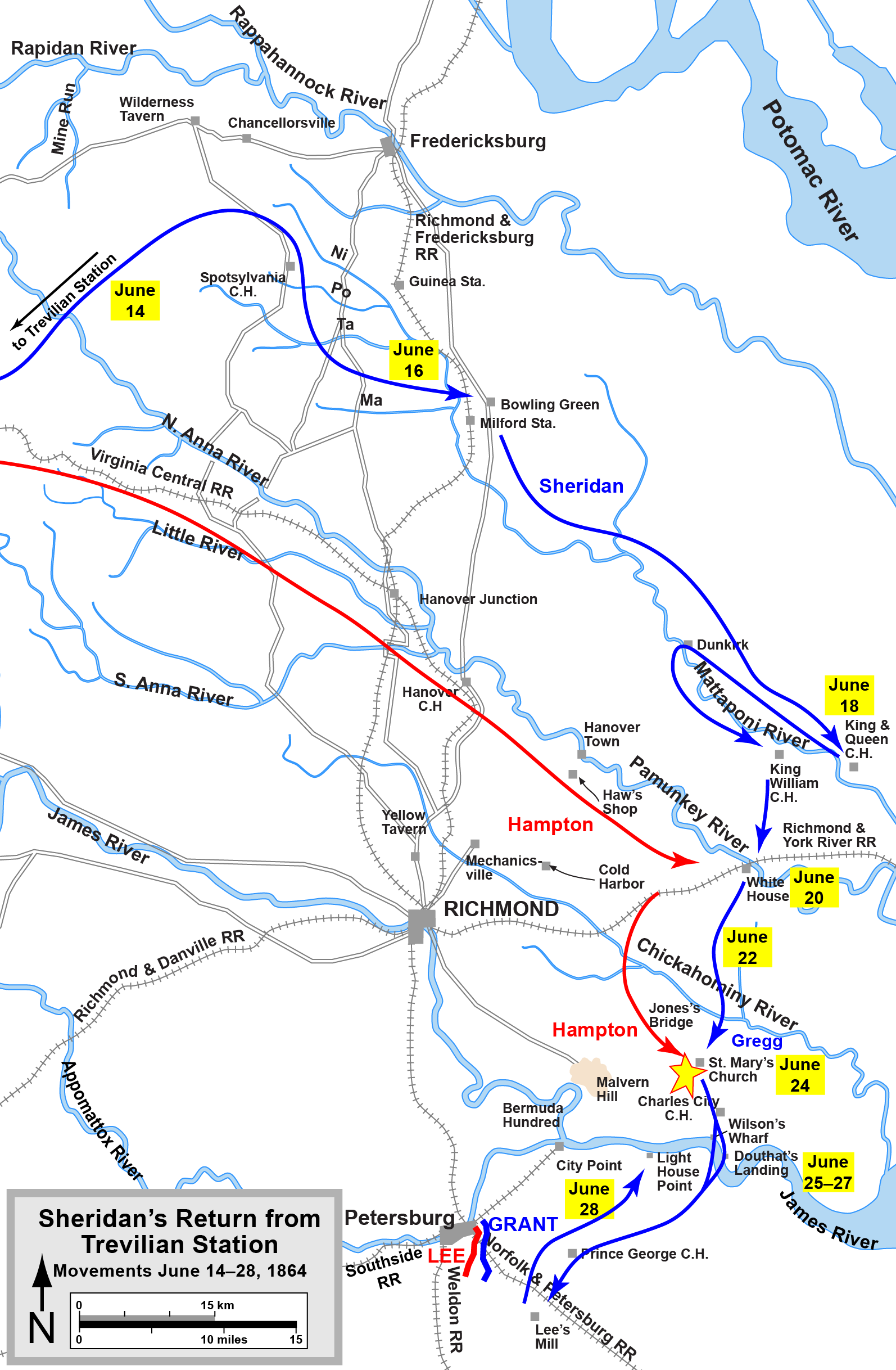
Sheridan's return to the Army of the Potomac from his Trevilian Station raid

Following the Battle of Trevilian Station, Sheridan's cavalry began to return on June 13 from their unsuccessful raid. They crossed the North Anna at Carpenter's Ford and then headed on the Catharpin Road in the direction of Spotsylvania Court House. On June 16 the column passed through Bowling Green and, traveling along the north bank of the Mattaponi River, arrived at King and Queen Court House on June 18. Hampton's Confederate cavalry left Trevilian Station and followed Sheridan on roughly parallel roads to the south.

While Sheridan's men were off on their raid, Grant's army had begun moving from Cold Harbor to cross the James River. In conjunction with this move, Grant ordered that his principal supply base be moved from White House on the Pamunkey River to City Point on the James. Sheridan learned that the White House depot had not yet been broken up, so he sent his wounded, prisoners, and African-Americans who had been following his column, to White House under escort on June 19, and then marched back to Dunkirk, where he could cross the Mattaponi.

On June 20, Fitz Lee attempted to attack the Union supply depot at White House, but Sheridan's arrival relieved the garrison there. On June 21, Sheridan crossed over the Pamunkey River, leading 900 wagons toward the James River. On June 24, Torbert's division escorted the wagons as Gregg's division followed a parallel route, protecting the right flank. At about 8 a.m., Gregg's division pushed back Confederate pickets to the north and entrenched to the west of Samaria Church (identified in Federal reports as St. Mary's Church). From 3 to 4 p.m., Hampton's five brigades attacked Gregg's two. The pressure was too great on the Union cavalrymen and they began to withdraw down the road to Charles City Court House.

Gregg's division escaped relatively intact and the supply wagons were unmolested. Having been blocked by Hampton's cavalry, Sheridan withdrew on June 25 and moved through Charles City Court House to Douthat's Landing, where the trains crossed the James on flatboats. His cavalry followed on June 27 and 28. The Confederate cavalry attempted to position themselves for another attack, but the Union force was too strong and the Southern horsemen were too worn out. Hampton received orders from Robert E. Lee to continue quickly to Petersburg to deal with the Wilson-Kautz Raid against railroads south of the city. His men crossed the James on a pontoon bridge at Chaffin's Bluff, also on June 27 and 28.

Sheridan's raid to Trevilian Station and back to the Army of the Potomac achieved mixed results. He successfully diverted Confederate attention from Grant's crossing of the James, but was unsuccessful in his objective of cutting the Virginia Central Railroad, a critical supply line to the Confederate capital and Lee's army. He also suffered relatively heavy casualties—particularly in his officer corps—and lost a large number of his horses to battle and heat exhaustion. And yet Sheridan claimed his raid was an undeniable victory. In his 1866 official report on operations he wrote, "The result was constant success and the almost total annihilation of the rebel cavalry. We marched when and where we pleased; were always the attacking party, and always successful."

The results of Hampton's cavalry activities against Sheridan were also mixed, but are usually seen in a more positive light than Sheridan's. He had succeeded in protecting the railroads and, indirectly, Richmond. He achieved tactical victories on the second day of Trevilian Station and against Gregg at Samaria Church, but failed to destroy the Union cavalry or its trains. In August, he was named commander of the Cavalry Corps of the Army of Northern Virginia, filling the position that had remained open since the death of J.E.B. Stuart.

== Aftermath ==
Grant's crossing of the James altered his original strategy of attempting to drive directly on Richmond, and led to the siege of Petersburg. After Lee learned that Grant had crossed the James, his worst fear was about to be realized—that he would be forced into a siege in defense of the Confederate capital. Petersburg, a prosperous city of 18,000, was a supply center for Richmond, given its strategic location just south of the capital, its site on the Appomattox River that provided navigable access to the James River, and its role as a major crossroads and junction for five railroads. Since Petersburg was the main supply base and rail depot for the entire region, including Richmond, the taking of Petersburg by Union forces would make it impossible for Lee to continue defending the Confederate capital. This represented a change of strategy from that of Grant's Overland Campaign, in which confronting and defeating Lee's army in the open was the primary goal. Now, Grant selected a geographic and political target and knew that his superior resources could besiege Lee there, pin him down, and either starve him into submission or lure him out for a decisive battle. Lee at first believed that Grant's main target was Richmond and devoted only minimal troops under Gen. P.G.T. Beauregard to the defense of Petersburg as the siege of Petersburg began.

The Overland Campaign was a thrust necessary for the Union to win the war, and although Grant suffered a number of setbacks, the campaign led to subsequent strategic successes for the Union. By engaging Lee's forces and not permitting them to escape, Grant forced Lee into an untenable position. But this came at a high cost. The campaign was the bloodiest in American history: approximately 55,000 casualties on the Union side (of which 7,600 were killed), 33,600 (4,300 killed) on the Confederate. Lee's losses, although lower in absolute numbers, were higher in percentage (over 50%) than Grant's (about 45%), and more critically, while Grant could expect reinforcements to replace his army's losses, Lee largely could not. His losses were irreplaceable. Furthermore, the public interprets the results of the campaign based on these casualty lists. Earl Hess states, "The observer should not be fooled by the gory assaults that riveted everyone's attention from Spotsylvania onward—the Overland Campaign was at its heart a campaign of maneuver...Grant's most significant achievement in the Overland Campaign was not capturing territory or reducing the fighting of strength of the Army of Northern Virginia by 50%; rather, it lay in robbing Lee of the opportunity to launch large scale offensives against the Army of the Potomac."

Estimates vary as to the casualties for the entire campaign. The following table summarizes estimates from a variety of popular sources:

Casualty Estimates for the Overland Campaign
| Source | Union | | | | Confederate | | | | Total Casualties |
| Source | Killed | Wounded | Captured/ Missing | Total | Killed | Wounded | Captured/ Missing | Total | Total Casualties |
|---|---|---|---|---|---|---|---|---|---|
| National Park Service | | | | 38,691 | | | | 31,448 | 70,139 |
| Bonekemper, Victor, Not a Butcher | 7,621 | 38,339 | 8,966 | 54,926 | 4,206 | 18,564 | 9,861 | 32,631 | 87,557 |
| Esposito, West Point Atlas | | | | 55,000 | | | | 20–40,000 | 75–95,000 |
| McPherson, Battle Cry | | | | 65,000 | | | | 35,000 | 100,000 |
| Rhea, In the Footsteps of Grant and Lee | | | | 55,000 | | | | 33,000 | 88,000 |
| Smith, Grant | | | | almost 65,000 | | | | 35,000 | almost 100,000 |
| U.S. War Dept., Official Records | 7,621 | 38,339 | 8,966 | 54,926 | | | | | |
| Young, Lee's Army | | | | | 4,352 | 19,130 | 10,164 | 33,646 | |

Grant was less reckless with his soldiers' lives than his predecessors had been. No single day of Grant's pounding saw the magnitude of Union casualties that McClellan incurred in one day at Antietam, and no three consecutive days of Grant's warring proved as costly to the Union in blood as did Meade's three days at Gettysburg. ... Grant and Lee were about as evenly matched in military talent as any two opposing generals have ever been. Grant's strength was unwavering adherence to his strategic objective. He made mistakes, but the overall pattern of his campaign reveals an innovative general employing thoughtful combinations of maneuver and force to bring a difficult adversary to bay on his home turf. Lee's strength was resilience and the fierce devotion that he inspired in his troops. He, too, made mistakes and often placed his smaller army in peril. But each time—Spotsylvania Court House and the North Anna River come to mind—he improvised solutions that turned bad situations his way.

— Gordon C. Rhea, In the Footsteps of Grant and Lee

The massive casualties sustained in the campaign were damaging to the Northern war effort. The price of gold almost doubled and Abraham Lincoln's prospects for reelection were put into jeopardy. It was only the later successes at Mobile Bay, the Shenandoah Valley, and Sherman's capture of Atlanta that turned around Northern morale and the political situation. Grant's reputation also suffered. Therefore, while the Overland campaign ultimately led to the successful Siege of Peterburg, some historians argue that it was, by itself, inconclusive. In a major study published by the Combat Studies Institute Press in Fort Leavenworth Kansas, the authors conclude that: "In the end, the Overland Campaign did not produce a decisive victory for either side. ... With two such skillful commanders, it should not be surprising that the Overland Campaign was a bloody, yet indecisive, campaign".

The knowledge that he could more easily afford to replace his losses of men and equipment than Lee may have influenced Grant's strategy. However, historians do not agree that Grant deliberately engaged in numerous attacks merely to defeat Lee solely through attrition, without regard for the losses to his army, needlessly throwing lives away in fruitless frontal assaults to bludgeon Lee. The overall strategy of the Overland Campaign depended on using Grant's numerical superiority to allow progressive shifts to the left by "spare" Union corps while Confederate forces were relatively pinned in their positions by the remaining Union forces. Such a strategy could not succeed without the continuing threat of defeat by direct assault in each of the positions assumed by Lee's army. The strategy failed in that Lee, possessing shorter lines of march (being nearer to Richmond, which was also his base), was able to prevent Grant's forces getting between Lee and Richmond, but was effective in allowing Grant to draw progressively closer to Richmond up to the battle at Cold Harbor. There, with the barrier of the James River and estuary to his left, Grant did not have the room necessary to continue such movements. He had to choose one among three possibilities: attack, shift to the right and thus back toward Washington, or cross the James to get at Lee's supply lines. He attempted the first, then did the third, as the second was unacceptable.

== Additional campaign maps ==
=== Gallery: Overland Campaign (Operational maps) ===
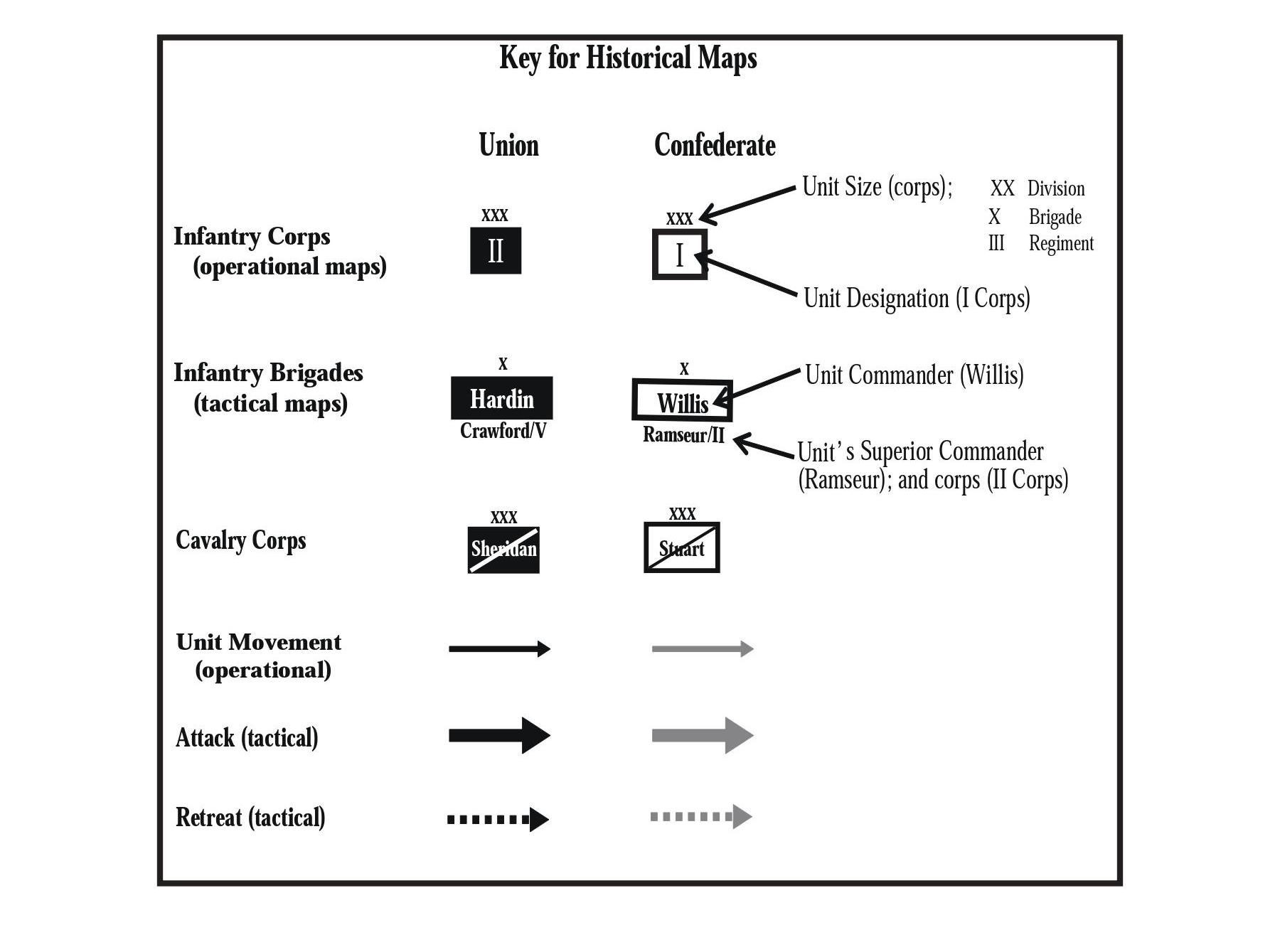
Key to operational maps.

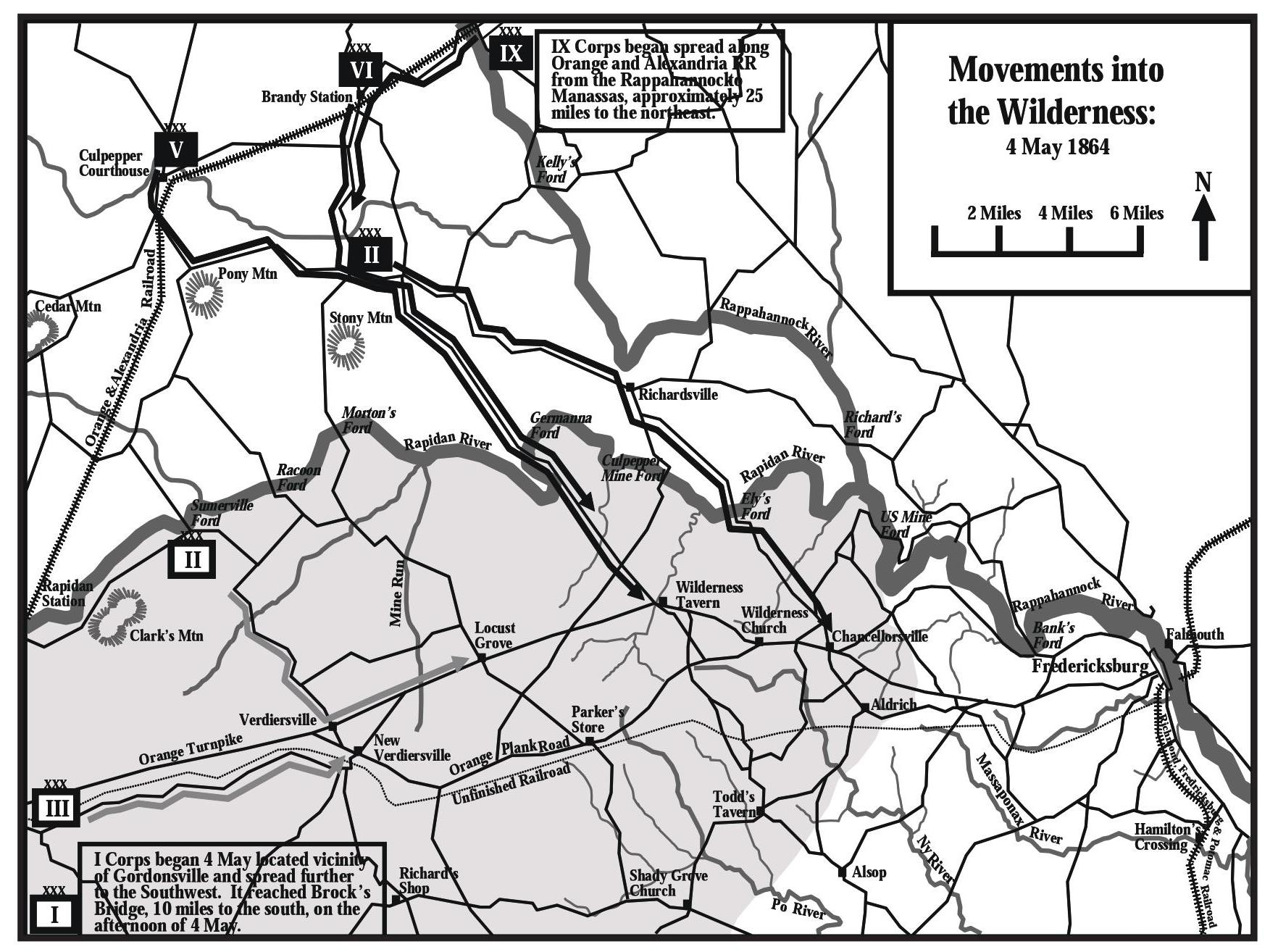
Map 1:
Movements into the Wilderness: 4 May 1864.

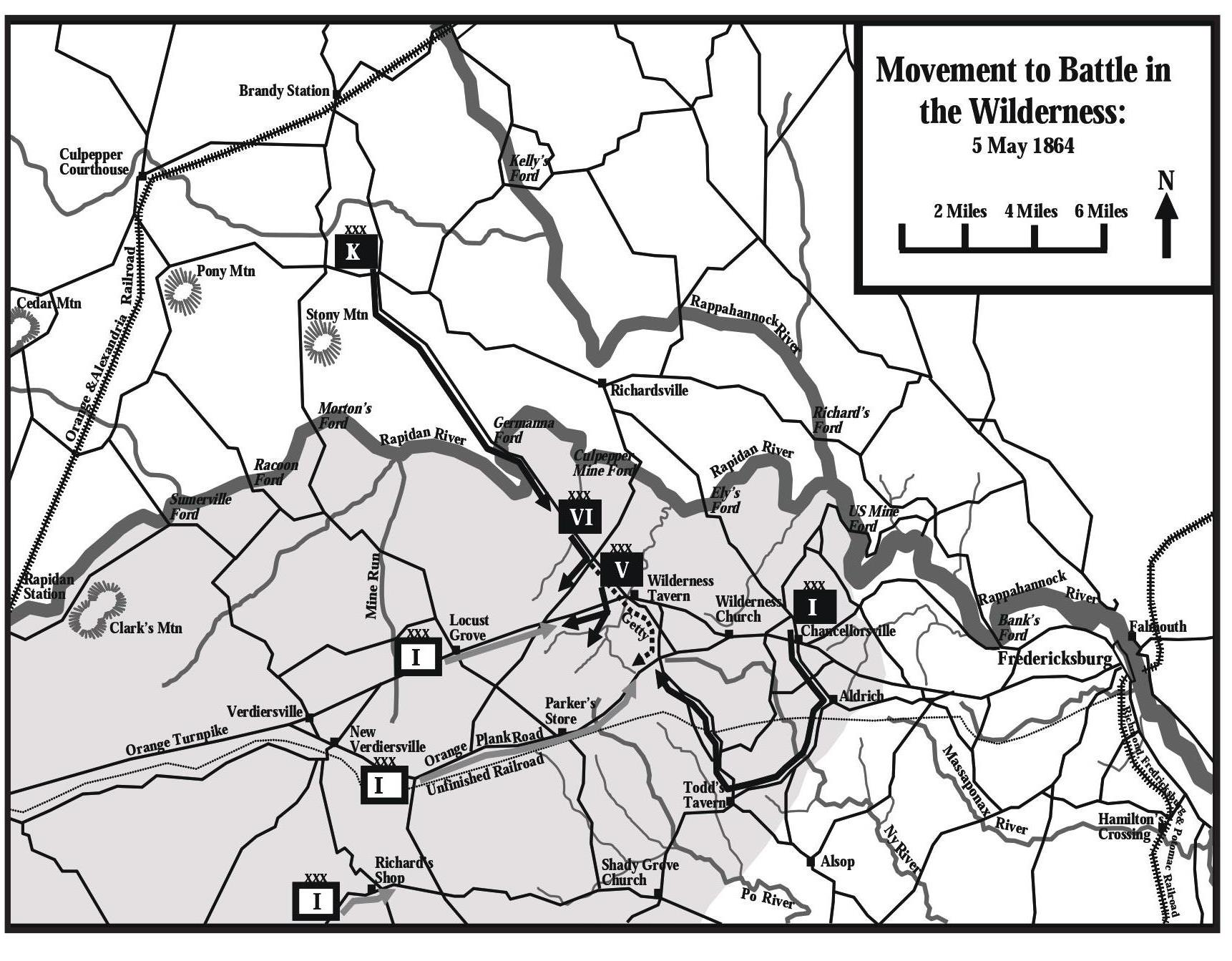
Map 2:
Movement to Battle in the Wilderness: 5 May 1864.

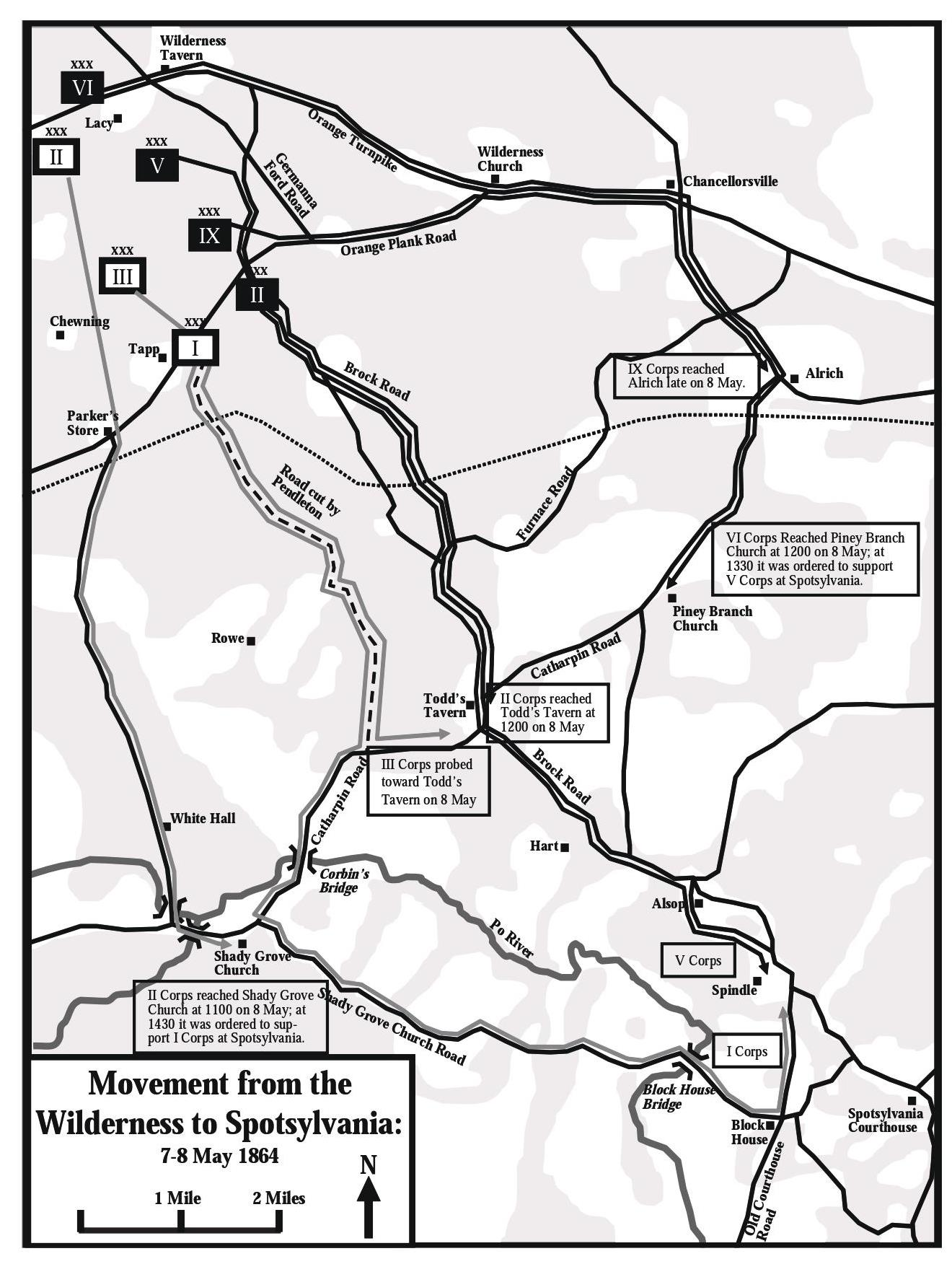
Map 3:
Movement from the Wilderness to Spotsylvania: 7–8 May 1864.

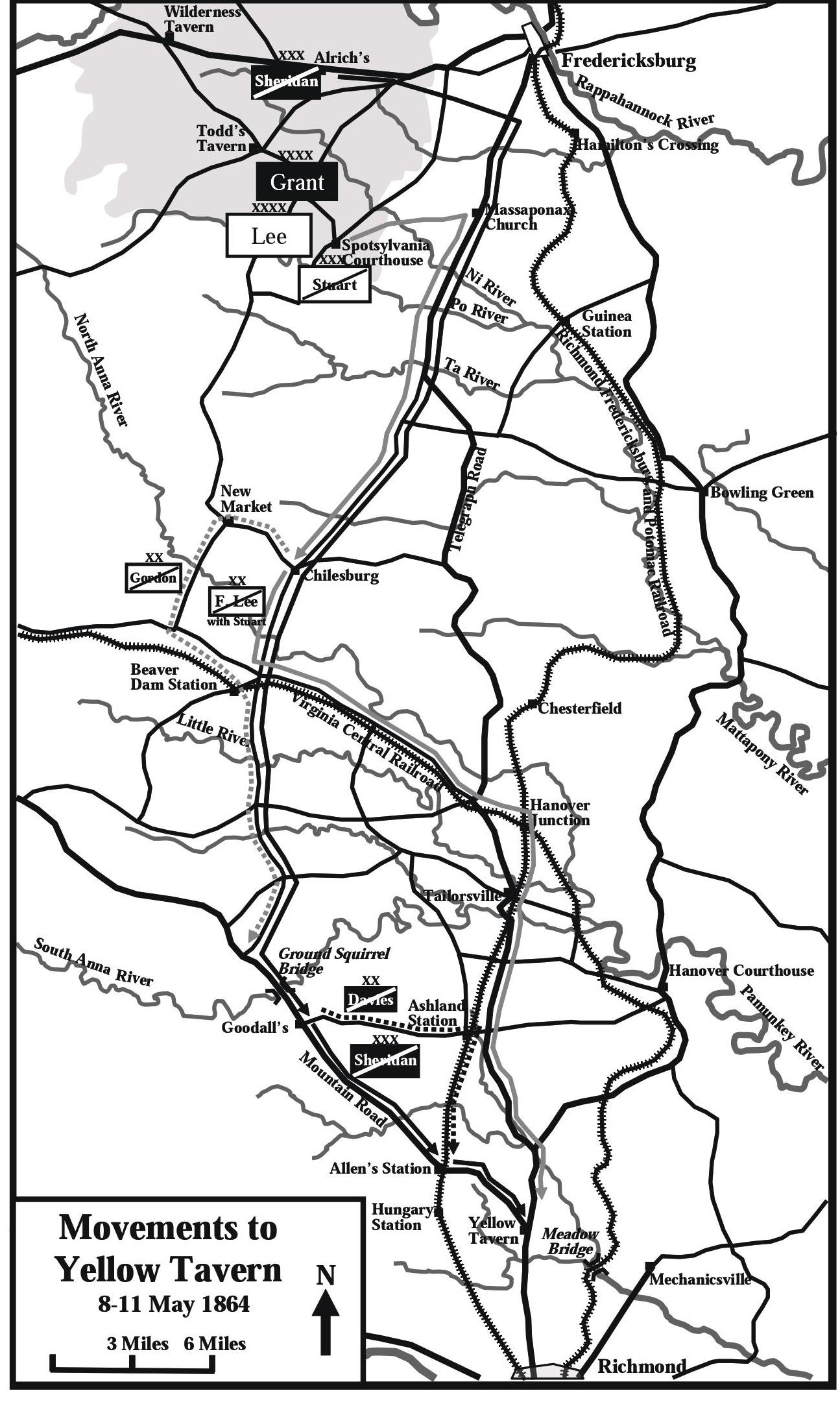
Map 4:
Movements to Yellow Tavern: 8–11 May 1864.

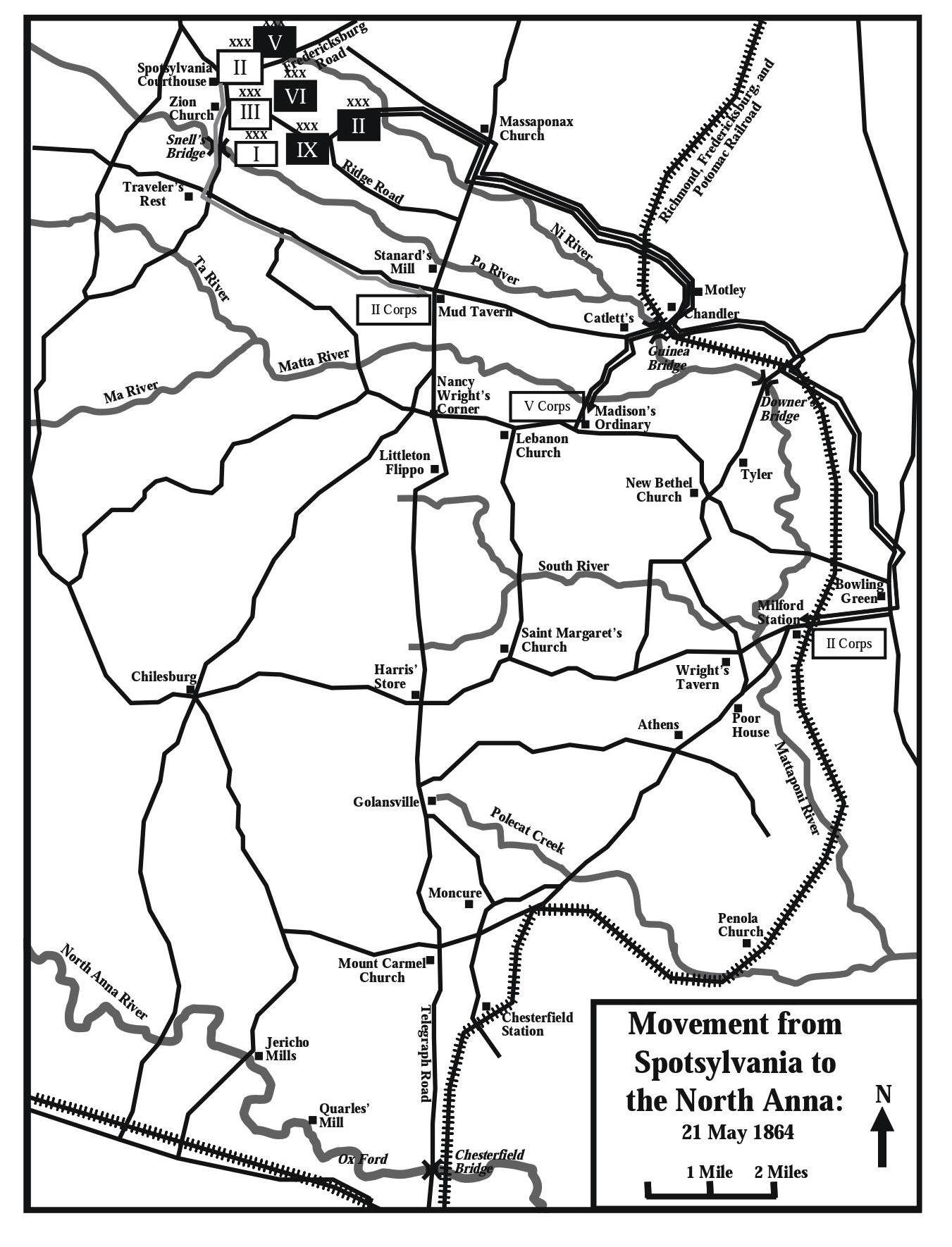
Map 5:
Movement from Spotsylvania to the North Anna: 21 May 1864.

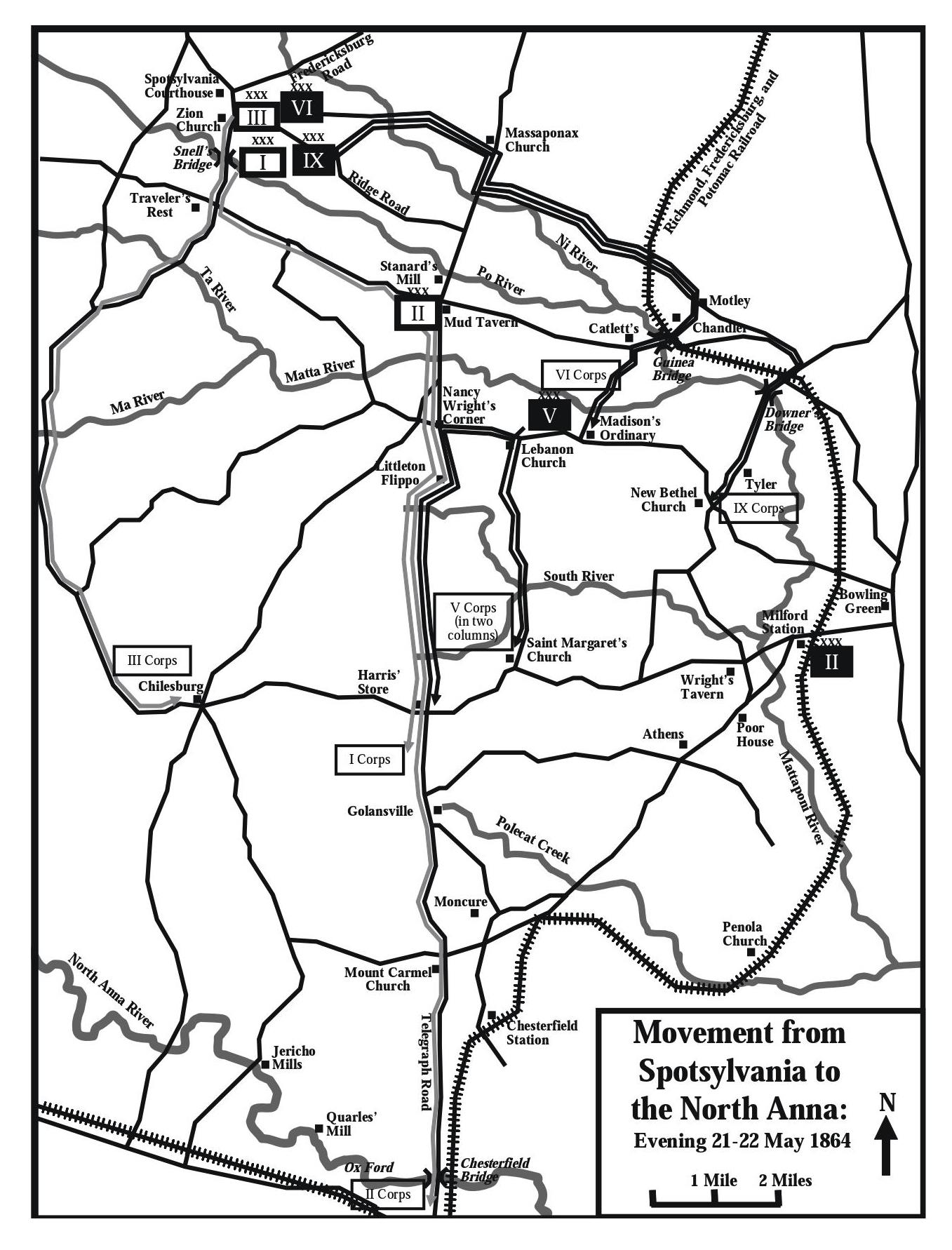
Map 6:
Movement from Spotsylvania to the North Anna: Evening 21–22 May 1864.

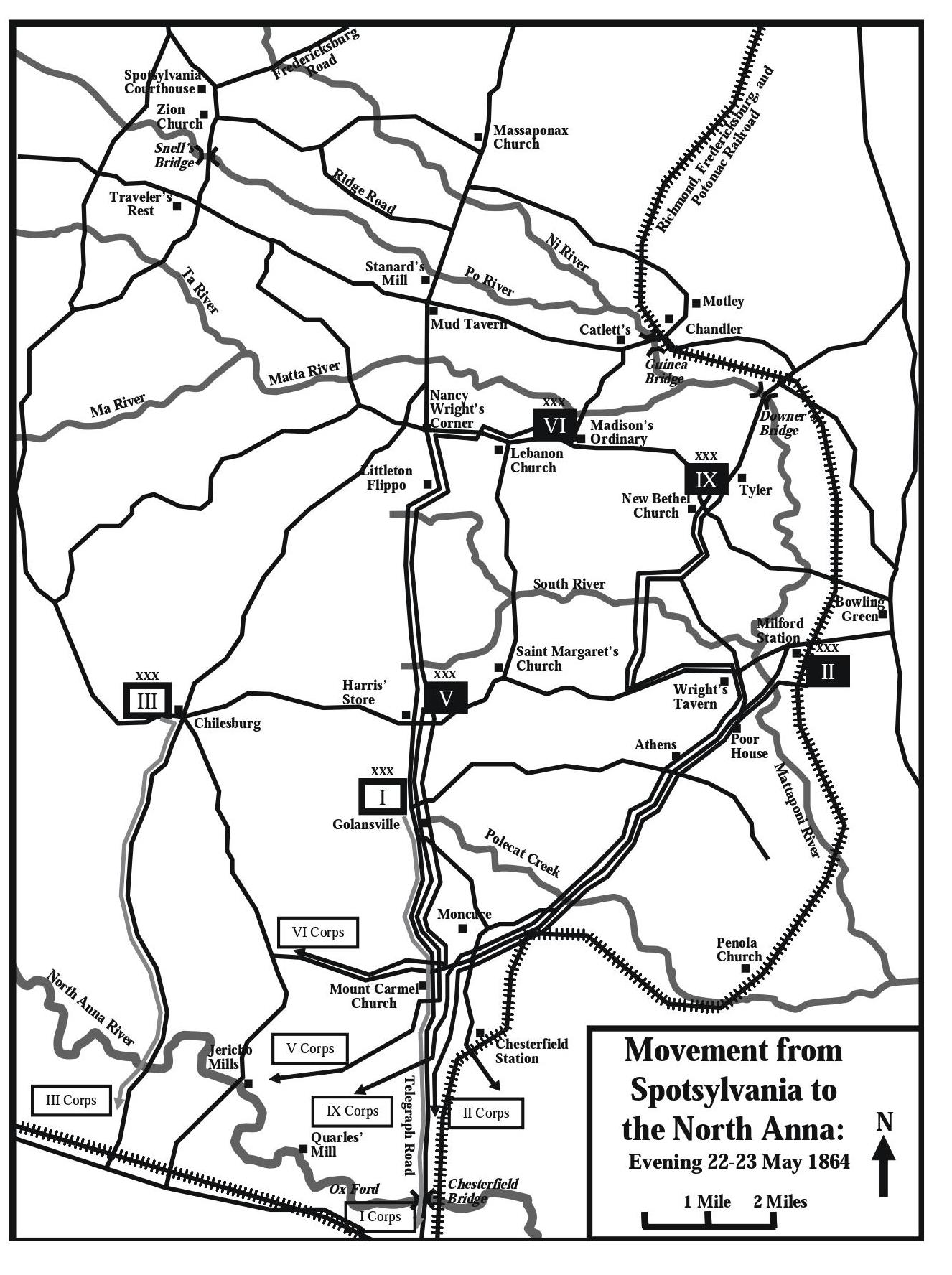
Map 7:
Movement from Spotsylvania to the North Anna: Evening 22–23 May 1864.

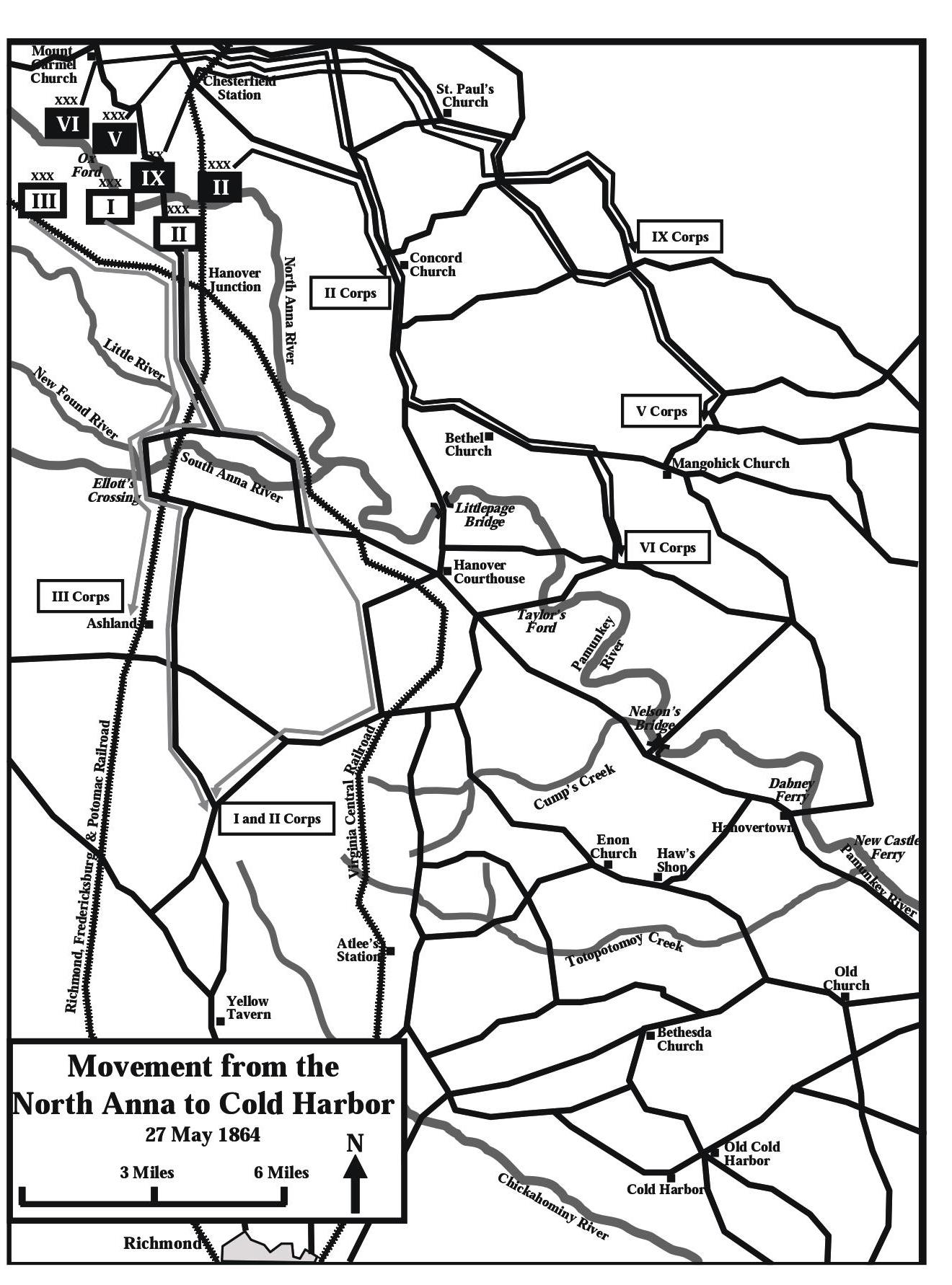
Map 8:
Movement from the North Anna to Cold Harbor: 27 May 1864.

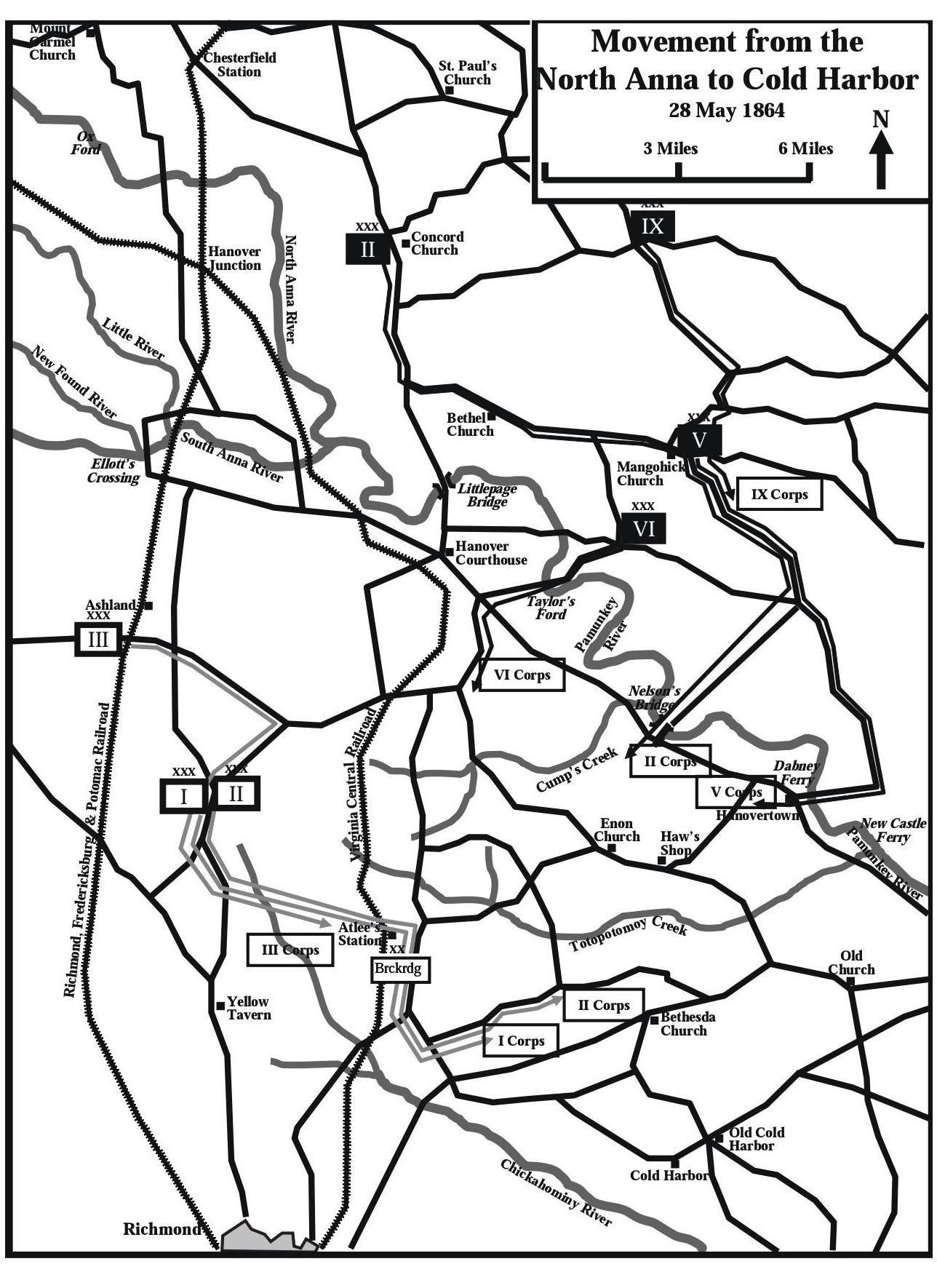
Map 9:
Movement from the North Anna to Cold Harbor: 28 May 1864.

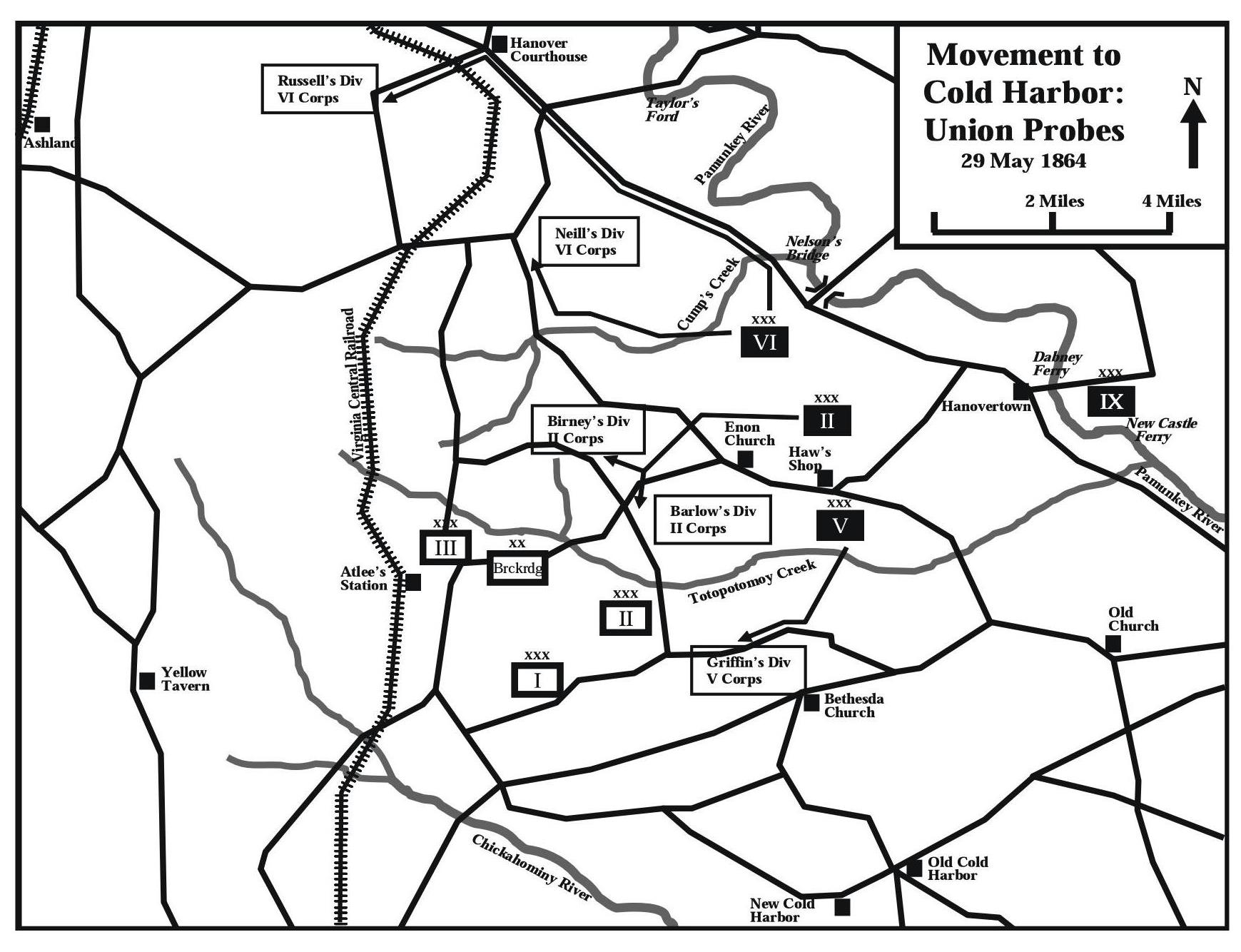
Map 10:
Movement to Cold Harbor - Union Probes: 29 May 1864.

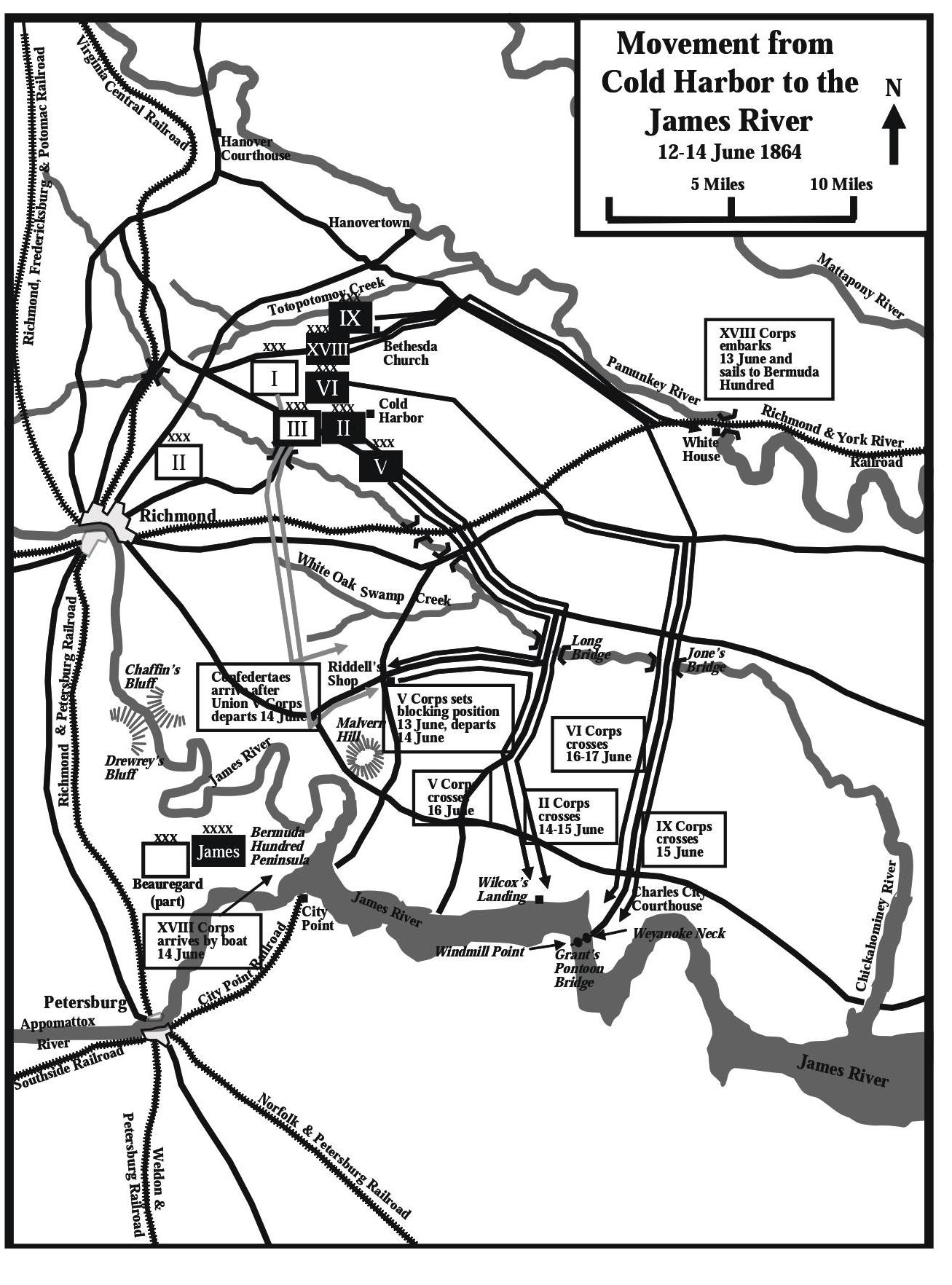
Map 11:
Movement from Cold Harbor to the James River: 12–14 June 1864.

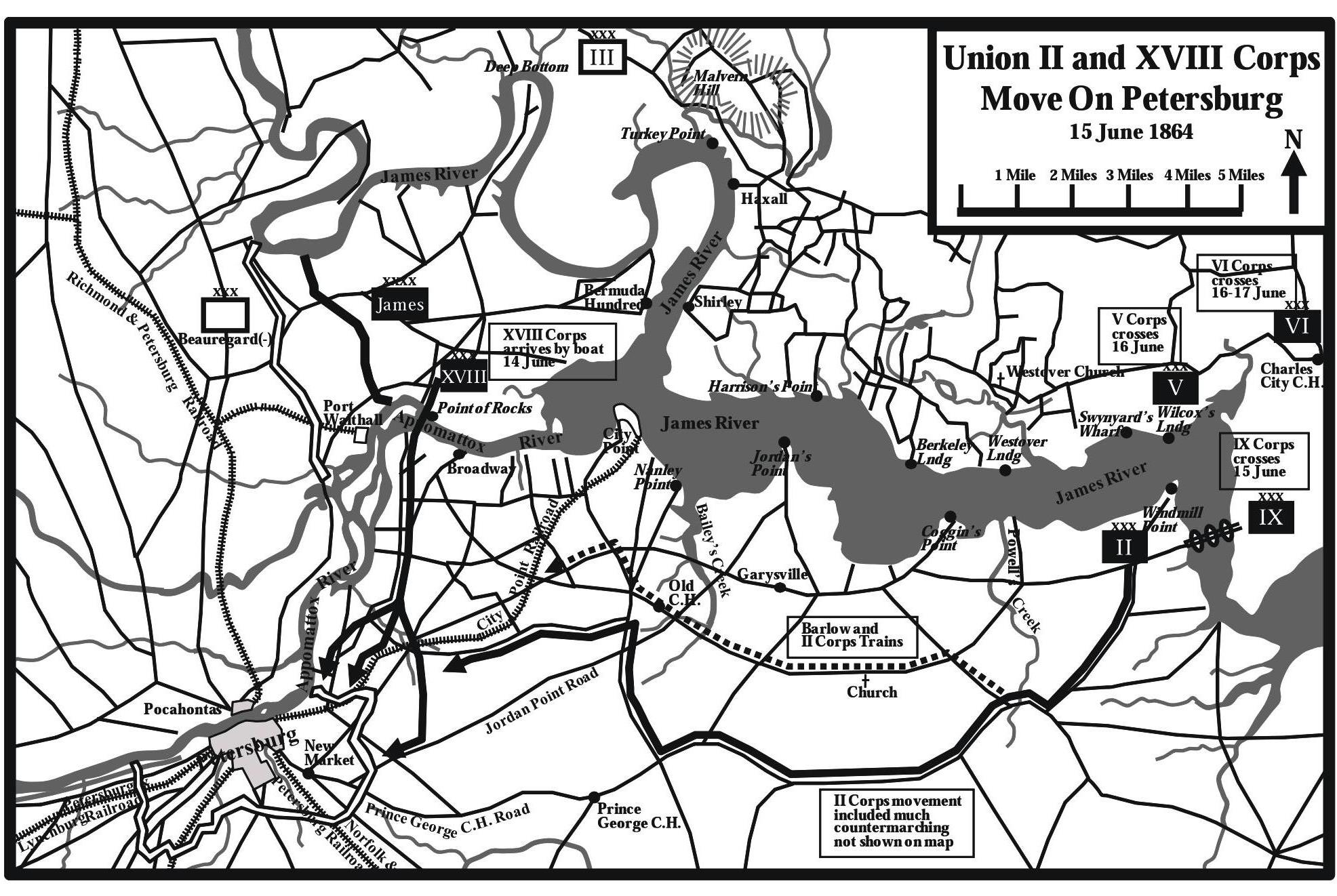
Map 12:
Union II and XVIII Corps move on Petersburg: 15 June 1864.

== See also ==
- Troop engagements of the American Civil War, 1864
- List of costliest American Civil War land battles
- Armies in the American Civil War
- Commemoration of the American Civil War
- Commemoration of the American Civil War on postage stamps
- Bibliography of Ulysses S. Grant
