= Battle of the Crater order of battle: Confederate =

The following Confederate Army units and commanders fought in the Battle of the Crater (July 30, 1864) of the American Civil War. The Union order of battle is listed separately.

== Abbreviations used ==
=== Military Rank ===
- Gen = General
- MG = Major General
- BG = Brigadier General
- Col = Colonel
- Ltc = Lieutenant Colonel
- Maj = Major
- Cpt = Captain
- Lt = Lieutenant

=== Other ===
- (w) = wounded
- (mw) = mortally wounded
- (k) = killed in action
- (c) = captured

== Army of Northern Virginia ==
Gen Robert E. Lee

=== III Corps ===
LTG A. P. Hill

Division	Brigade	Regiments and Others
Richard Anderson's Division; BG William Mahone	Mahone's (Virginia) Brigade Col David A. Weisiger (w); Col George T. Rogers	6th Virginia: Col George T. Rogers, Ltc Henry W. Williamson; 12th Virginia: Cpt Richard W. Jones; 16th Virginia: Ltc Richard O. Whitehead; 41st Virginia: Maj William H. Etheridge; 61st Virginia: Ltc William H. Stewart
Richard Anderson's Division; BG William Mahone	Wilcox's (Alabama) Brigade Col John C. C. Sanders	8th Alabama: Cpt William W. Mordecai; 9th Alabama: Col J. Horace King; 10th Alabama: Cpt Wilson L. Brewster; 11th Alabama: Ltc George E. Tayloe; 14th Alabama: Cpt Elias Folk (k)
Richard Anderson's Division; BG William Mahone	Wright's (Georgia) Brigade Ltc Matthew R. Hall	3rd Georgia: Ltc Claiborne Snead; 22nd Georgia: Col George H. Jones; 48th Georgia: Ltc Reuben W. Carswell; 64th Georgia: Col John W. Evans (w)

=== Artillery ===
BG William N. Pendleton

First Corps; Ltc Frank Huger	Haskell's Battalion Maj John C. Haskell	Branch Battery (North Carolina): Cpt Henry G. Flanner; Nelson Battery (Virginia): Cpt James N. Lamkin
First Corps; Ltc Frank Huger	13th Battalion Virginia Light Artillery Maj Wade H. Gibbs (w)	Company A, Otey Battery: Cpt David N. Walker; Company B, Ringgold Battery: Cpt Crispin Dickenson; Company C, Davidson's Battery: Lt John H. Chamberlayne; Mortar Battery: Lt Jack Langhorne
Third Corps; Col Reuben Lindsay Walker	Pegram's Battalion Ltc William Pegram	Crenshaw's Battery (Virginia): Cpt Thomas Ellett; Letcher Light Artillery: Cpt Thomas A. Brander

== Department of North Carolina And Southern Virginia ==
Gen P.G.T. Beauregard

Division	Brigade	Regiments and Others
Johnson's Division; BG Bushrod Johnson	Ransom's (North Carolina) Brigade Col Leroy M. McAfee	24th North Carolina: Col William J. Clarke; 25th North Carolina: Maj William S. Grady (mw); 35th North Carolina: Col James T. Johnson; 49th North Carolina: Ltc John A. Flemming (k), Ltc James T. Davis; 56th North Carolina: Cpt Lawson Harrill
Johnson's Division; BG Bushrod Johnson	Elliott's (South Carolina) Brigade BG Stephen Elliott, Jr. (w); Col. William H. Wallace	17th South Carolina: Col Fitz W. McMaster, Maj John R. Culp; 18th South Carolina: Col William H. Wallace, Lt Col William B. Allison; 22nd South Carolina: Col David G. Flemming (k), Cpt James N. Shedd; 23rd South Carolina: Col Henry L. Benbow (w); 26th South Carolina: Col Alexander D. Smith
Johnson's Division; BG Bushrod Johnson	Wise's (Virginia) Brigade Col J. Thomas Goode	26th Virginia: Ltc William K. Perrin; 34th Virginia: Maj John R. Bagby; 46th Virginia: Ltc John H. Richardson; 59th Virginia: Cpt Henry Wood (w)
Hoke's Division; MG Robert Hoke	Clingman's (North Carolina) Brigade BG Thomas L. Clingman	61st North Carolina: Col James D. Radcliffe
Hoke's Division; MG Robert Hoke	Colquitt's (Georgia) Brigade [temporarily assigned to Johnson's Division] BG Alfred H. Colquitt	6th Georgia: Col John T. Lofton; 19th Georgia: Col James H. Neal; 23rd Georgia: Col James H. Huggins; 27th Georgia: Maj Hezekiah Bussey; 28th Georgia: Cpt John A. Johnson
Artillery; Col Hilary Pollard Jones, Sr.	Branch's Battalion Maj James C. Coit	Halifax Battery (Virginia): Cpt Samuel T. Wright; Petersburg Battery (Virginia): Cpt Richard G. Pegram

== See also ==
- Virginia in the American Civil War
- Petersburg National Battlefield
