= Battle of the Crater order of battle =

The order of battle for the Battle of the Crater includes:

- Battle of the Crater order of battle: Confederate
- Battle of the Crater order of battle: Union
