= 41st Virginia Infantry Regiment =

- Flag of Virginia, 1861
- Active: July 1861 – April 1865
- Disbanded: 1865
- Country: Confederacy
- Allegiance: Confederate States of America
- Branch: Confederate States Army
- Type: Infantry
- Engagements: American Civil War: Seizure of Norfolk – Battle of Seven Pines – Battle of Oak Grove – Battle of Malvern Hill – Second Battle of Bull Run – Battle of Crampton's Gap – Battle of Antietam – Battle of Shepherdstown – Battle of Fredericksburg – Battle of Chancellorsville – Battle of Salem Church – Battle of Gettysburg – Battle of Williamsport – Battle of Bristoe Station – Battle of the Wilderness – Battle of Spotsylvania Courthouse – Battle of Cold Harbor – Battle of Jerusalem Plank Road – Battle of the Crater – Battle of Globe Tavern – Battle of Boydton Plank Road – Battle of Hatcher's Run – Battle of High Bridge – Battle of Cumberland Church – Battle of Appomattox Court House

Commanders
- Notable commanders: Colonel John R. Chambliss; Colonel W. A. Parham; Lt. Colonel Joseph P. Minetree; Major William H. Etheridge

Private Joseph T. Rowland of Co. A, 41st Virginia Infantry Regiment

The 41st Virginia Infantry Regiment was an infantry regiment raised in the Commonwealth of Virginia for service in the Confederate States Army during the American Civil War. It fought mostly with the Army of Northern Virginia in Longstreet's corps and, later, that army's Third Corps.

The regiment was formed from independent militia companies operating in the Norfolk area, with men from the surrounding counties, as far west as Petersburg. Throughout the war it operated in brigades under William Mahone and David A. Weisiger, and the divisions of Benjamin Huger, Richard H. Anderson, and William Mahone. The regiment participated in the capture and later abandonment of Norfolk Naval Yard, and every major campaign of the Army of Northern Virginia. Several dozen men and officers of the regiment also served on the CSS Virginia in the Battle of Hampton Roads. The 41st Virginia was also involved in the friendly fire incident that severely wounded James Longstreet during the Battle of the Wilderness.

== The Virginia Militia ==
In late 1860, Thomas Kevill, the Irish-born proprietor of a clothing store and captain of the Norfolk United Volunteer Fire Company, organized the United Artillery Company, composed mainly from firemen from Norfolk, Virginia. By the time Virginia's secession convention met on April 17, he had procured a few light artillery pieces. William H. Etheridge had also formed a company of infantry, the Norfolk County Rifle Patriots, raised among men from Great Bridge, Virginia.

Immediately after the secession convention announced their vote, Norfolk's mayor ordered the local militia, including Kevill and Etheridge, to seize strategic points. Kevill took Fort Norfolk on the Elizabeth River below the Norfolk Naval Shipyard and moved heavy artillery pieces from the War of 1812 found in the basement of city hall there to defend the harbor. Etheridge's company occupied Washington Point across the Elizabeth River from the Norfolk Naval Shipyard.

Private Isaac Walling of Kevill's United Artillery Company was a professional diver and helped raise the hull of the scuttled screw-frigate Merrimac, destroyed by Federal forces while abandoning the Navy Yard. Confederate engineers planned to use the iron hull to build an ironclad ram.

Virginia Governor John Letcher appointed Robert E. Lee a major general in charge of the Commonwealth's military force on April 23. Lee distributed arms from the state's arsenals and issued a call for volunteer troops. Thomas Junius Eppes, a 33-year-old wealthy planter, formed the Sussex Sharpshooters from men in Sussex with the help of his lieutenant, W. A. Parham State Senator Benjamin Hatcher Nash formed the Confederate Grays with men from Chesterfield, Henrico, and Hanover Counties, as well as Richmond, where they were sworn in at Capitol Square wearing elaborate uniforms paid for by the wealthy Clay Drewry. James Skelton Gilliam recruited for his McRae Rifles from Petersburg, but heavy recruiting in the area forced him to also bring in men from surrounding counties. Asa Reynolds Smith formed the Rough and Ready Volunteers from among the coal miners and workers around his Clover Hill farm, many foreign born, and including his brother and the son of the mine owner. Portsmouth businessman Charles R. McAlpine recruited for his Bilisoly Blues among the dock workers and laborers in Portsmouth and Suffolk, though he was only able to recruit 68 men thanks to heavy recruiting in the area already and suspicion about the loyalties of the many foreigners in his company.

== Companies and Formation ==
On May 23, Virginia voters ratified the state's secession and it became part of the Confederate States of America. The Virginia State Militia became part of the Confederate States Army and Virginia Brigadier General Benjamin Huger was put in charge of the Department of Norfolk, becoming a Confederate brigadier two weeks later. On July 1, he signed an order organizing the various companies of state militia into regiments, including the 41st Virginia, which he formed with seven companies, intending to bring the total up to ten with additional recruitment, with West Point graduate John R. Chambliss in command as colonel.

The original seven companies were:

- Company A – Sussex Sharpshooters (Sussex Co.), Captain Thomas J. Eppes
- Company B – Confederate Grays (Chesterfield Co., Henrico Co., Hanover Co., and Richmond), Captain Benjamin H. Nash
- Company C – McRae Rifles (Petersburg, Prince George Co., Dinwiddie Co., and Chesterfield Co.), Captain James S. Gilliam
- Company D – Rough and Ready Volunteers (Clover Hill), Captain Asa R. Smith
- Company E – United Artillery Company (Norfolk County), Captain Thomas Kevill
- Company F – Norfolk County Rifle Patriots (Norfolk Co., now extinct), Captain William H. Etheridge
- Company G – Bilisoly Blues (Norfolk Co.), Captain Charles R. McAlpine

Additionally, three companies were recruited to fill out the regiment's ranks throughout July and August.

- Company H – from Southampton Co., Captain George E. Beaton
- Company I – Cypress Chapel Sharpshooters from Nansemond Co. (now part of Suffolk), Captain Robert B. Brinkley
- Company K – South Quay Guards (Nansemond Co.), Captain Jonas W. Lawrence

Also attached to the 41st Virginia by Huger, though not companies of the regiment were:

- Cockade Cadets (Petersburg and surrounding areas), Captain John B. Laurens (later Company E of the regiment)
- Ragland Guards (Petersburg and surrounding areas), Captain James D. Maney (later Company G of the regiment)

Chambliss established regimental headquarters at Portsmouth Naval Hospital with Companies A, B, H, I, and K headquartered nearby and began drilling the regiment in expectation for a Union attempt to regain the naval yard. The remaining companies were left at the positions they had taken up after seizure of the naval yard, complicating efforts to train them. Company D was across the Elizabeth River at Lambert's Point, Company G was at Craney Island supporting Company C, which was manning the heavy artillery defending the mouth of the river, Company F was guarding the Portsmouth shipyards, and Company E was still manning the heavy guns at Fort Norfolk.

Huger ordered Chambliss to move his headquarters and the five companies surrounding it to Camp Anderson established on Sewell's Point on October 3. The men were armed with smooth-bore flintlock muskets, though many had been converted to use percussion caps. Huger also began slowly sorting out those men unfit for duty who had been enlisted by overzealous recruiters. On October 15, the regiment was brigaded with the 6th, 12th, 16th, 49th Virginia infantry regiments under Colonel William Mahone. Confederate President Jefferson Davis declared martial law and Lieutenant William "Gus" Parham of Company A became provost marshal of Norfolk.

== On The Peninsula and Around Richmond ==
In February 1862, Major General Ambrose Burnside led a Union expedition to seize Roanoke Island in North Carolina, raising concern that the next attack would be on Norfolk. In November, Chambliss had asked for volunteers from his regiment to man the rebuilt Merrimac, now the CSS Virginia. Of the 282 men that crewed the vessel, 31 were recruited from the 41st Virginia, mostly from the United Artillery (Company E), including Kevill, as well as Private Albert Griswold, who had been ship's tailor on the Merrimac before the war. On March 8, the Virginia engaged the USS Monitor in the Battle of Hampton Roads, the first battle between two ironclad ships.

Also on March 8, the regiment absorbed 195 conscripted soldiers, drafted that winter from all over Virginia, filling all the companies to as near one hundred men as possible. Captain Etheridge's Norfolk County Rifle Patriots (Company F) had too many men at 158 strong, and sent a third of them to join the newly formed 61st Virginia Infantry.

In late April, Kevill's United Artillery left the regiment to become Company C of the 19th Virginia Battalion, Heavy Artillery manning Fort Darling on the James River. The Cockade Cadets formerly became part of the regiment as the new Company E still under Captain Laurens. Captain Maney's Ragland Guards also replaced the Bilisoly Blues as Company G when they were also transferred to the 61st Virginia.

During April the Confederate Congress had passed a law requiring new elections for officers in the army's regiments. The men as a whole voted for company officers and the company officers together elected field officers. Of the 42 officers in the 41st Virginia, 28 percent were not reelected, though many appear to have left the service. Captain Benjamin Hatcher Nash of Company B, for example, left to serve full-time in the Virginia State Senate and was replaced by Clay Drewry. Lieutenant William "Gus" Parham of Company A was elected lieutenant colonel and Joseph P. Minetree was elected the new major.

=== The Peninsula Campaign ===
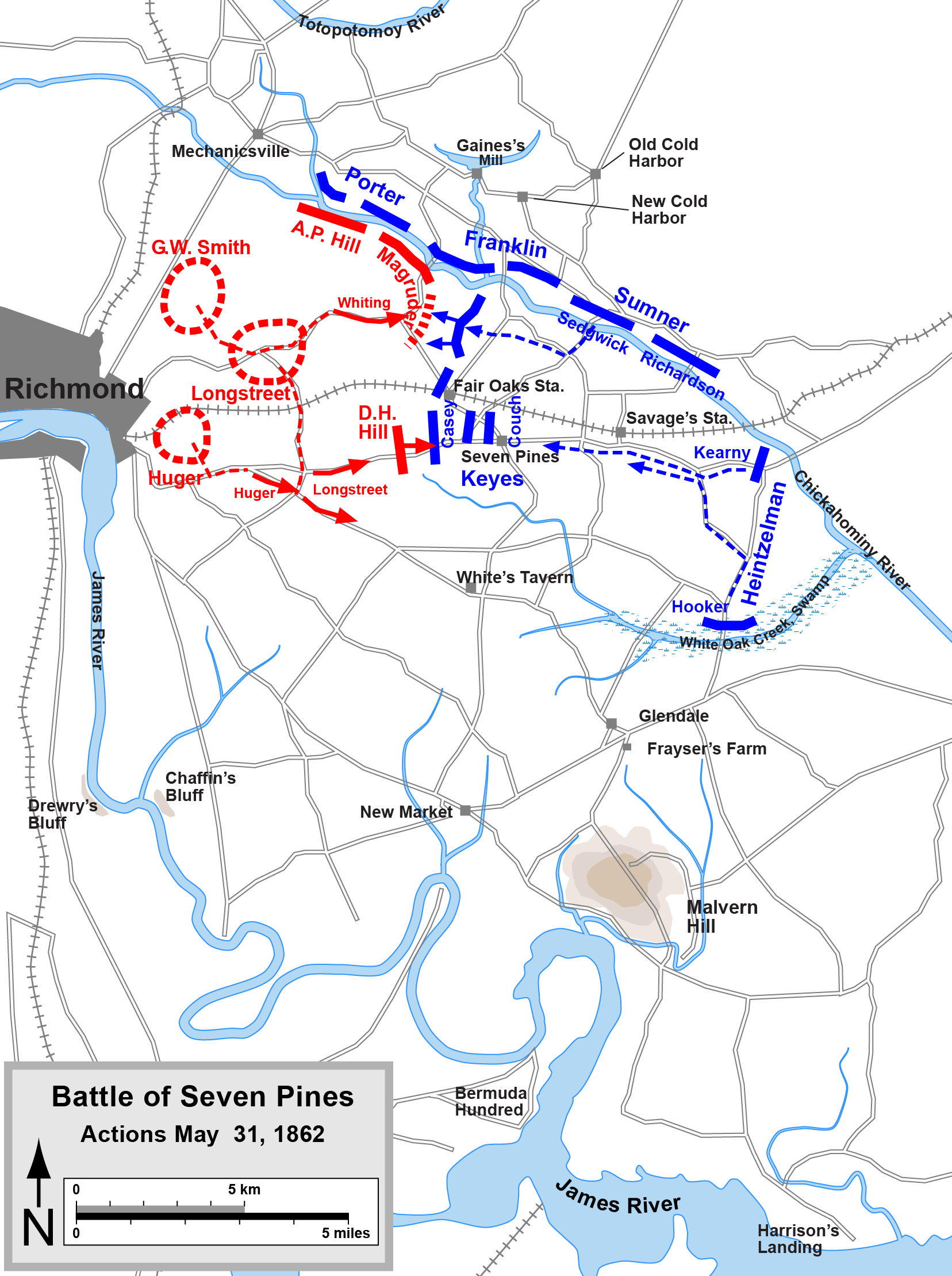
Battle of Seven Pines.

May 5 also saw the Battle of Williamsburg on the Virginia Peninsula where forces from Joseph E. Johnston's Army of Northern Virginia under James Longstreet fought a rear-guard action against the pursuing Union Army of the Potomac under the overall command of George B. McClellan. The retreat of the Army of Northern Virginia towards Richmond left Huger's division in Norfolk exposed to a Union attack and he received orders to begin planning a withdrawal. The Virginia was burned and all supplies that could be evacuated were, as a Union bombardment ordered by Abraham Lincoln himself began.

On May 10, a Union force under John E. Wool landed in Norfolk and the 41st Virginia acted as rear-guard, skirmishing with Wool's man until falling back and burning Tanner's Creek Bridge. Numbering 1,084, the regiment fell back to Suffolk, where it boarded trains for Petersburg where it was united for the first time, then crossed over to Dunn's Hill and on to Drewry's Bluff, on the north bank of the James River. On May 15, Mahone deployed the 41st Virginia in the woods around Fort Darling during the Battle of Drewry's Bluff to snipe at Union sailors on the USS Galena and the Monitor.

McClellan brought his army within several miles of Richmond and in late May, Johnston planned an offensive to attack the two Union corps south of the Chickahominy River. Huger's Division was to follow in support of the division of D.H. Hill, traveling down the Williamsburg Road. On May 31, when the plan was put into motion, though, James Longstreet led his division down the Williamsburg Road, delaying the entire offensive. Huger's Division spent the first night of the battle on the Charles City Road, with Mahone's Brigade guarding the army's right flank.

At dawn on the morning of June 1, the brigade traveled down a farmer's wagon road to Seven Pines, which they reached by 7:00 am. Hill ordered Mahone to deploy his brigade in a line near some woods and advance, but Colonel Chambliss paused long enough to send out Company K as skirmishers for the regiment, the only one to do so. As the brigade advanced through dense woods at 8:30 am, a hidden Union brigade under William French opened fire on them at fifty feet. The regiment had advanced unevenly and began to run under the heavy fire, but Captain Etheridge kept his Norfolk County Rifle Patriots (Company F) in line and Chambliss and Parham were able to reform the regiment on Etheridge's position. In the confusion, Huger brought up another brigade under Lewis Armistead to support Mahone, but the two began firing at each other. By 10:00 am, fighting in the 41st Virginia's sector was over, and Mahone's Brigade had captured a small strip of woods that had formed part of the Union line. The next morning the Confederates withdrew to their defenses, having failed to drive McClellan away, but also stopping his advance.

=== The Seven Days ===
Johnston had been wounded during the battle, leading Jefferson Davis to name Robert E. Lee to command the Army of Northern Virginia. Lee worked on improving the administration over the next few weeks and planning on offensive. On June 25, McClellan struck first, sending a division under Joseph Hooker advancing through Seven Pines. Huger responded with an attack by the brigade of Ambrose Wright at King's School House and Wright sent to Mahone for help. Near the end of the day, the 41st Virginia surprised Hooker's left flank and McClellan gave orders for Hooker's men to be withdrawn.

While other elements of the army engaged McClellan's force at Mechanicsville, Gaines' Mill, and Garnett's and Golding's Farm, Huger's Division maintained its position. On June 29, it was ordered down the Charles City Road to cut off the Union retreat, but Huger proceeded cautiously and lost the opportunity to do so. During the following day, while the division tried to struggle through felled trees along the road, some of Mahone's Brigade was detached to cover Mooreman's Battery, engaged in an artillery duel near White Oak Swamp. In Mahone's report at the end of the Seven Days he wrote that the regiment "suffered more severely than any other regiment, owing to its position" and "behaved well under the authority of the gallant Parham."

Mahone returned his men to the division on Charles City Road, where Huger held them, not moving to support either Thomas Jackson further east in White Oak Swamp or Longstreet at Glendale. The morning of July 1, Mahone's men traveled south towards the Union fall-back position at Malvern Hill and took up position on the Confederate right flank. At 4:00 pm, John Magruder bypassed Huger and ordered Mahone to charge the Union position. Instead, Mahone lead the two other brigades in Huger's division through the woods in an attempt to surprise the Union left flank. Union sharpshooters spotted the movement and joined artillery and naval bombardments in defeating the attack. The men of the 41st Virginia spent the night only a few hundred yards from Union lines, while a bombardment covered the Union withdrawal to Harrison's Landing.

The 41st Virginia remained near the Army of the Potomac until July 10, when it was moved to Chesterfield County while Lee reorganized the army Huger was replaced by Richard H. Anderson and the division became part of Longstreet's wing of the army. Colonel Chambliss, who had been recruiting for the 13th Virginia Cavalry for several months already, formally left the regiment to lead that unit and Lt. Colonel Gus Parham was tapped to replace him when he returned from a minor wound received guarding Moorman's Battery, with Major Minetree taking over his battalion, and Captain Etheridge taking over Minetree's battalion. During the campaigns on the peninsula the 41st Virginia had replaced its flintlocks with .58 caliber rifles captured from the Union army. The regiment had lost 186 officers and men during combat on the Virginia Peninsula, but with losses from desertion, less than 500 were present in Chesterfield County.

== Northern Virginia and Maryland Campaign ==
In August 1862, Lincoln ordered most of McClellan's army back to Alexandria, Virginia and placed it under the command of John Pope, commander of the recently formed Army of Virginia. On August 17, the 41st Virginia was transported by rail to Louisa Court House in central Virginia, and marched to Gordonsville the next day. The regiment spend the next week moving through Culpeper, holding at Jeffersonton (now Jefferson) on the southern bank of the Rappahannock River. Anderson's Division remained in Culpeper while Longstreet continued north, but when Jackson burned Pope's supply depot at Manassas on August 28, the division was ordered to rejoin the rest of Longstreet's wing.

=== Second Bull Run ===
The 41st Virginia covered 18 miles to reach Salem on August 29. The next day, Anderson's Division waited in the rear while Longstreet's lead units fought to clear their way through Thoroughfare Gap and the regiment slept a few hours just to the east of it. At midnight, the 41st Virginia began marching again and arrived in the rear of Longstreet's battle line at 5:00 am.

Anderson's Division joined in Longstreet's advance, beginning at 5:00 pm on August 30. The 41st Virginia advanced along the front line, and up Henry House Hill where it faced the Union's IX Corps. The attack routed Pope's army, but the stand on Henry House Hill was long enough that it was able to retreat in good order. During the attack, the regiment both Clay Drewry of Company B and Captain Beverly Hunter of Company K were wounded, along with General Mahone.

=== Antietam ===
With Lt. Colonel Parham leading the brigade, the 125 men of the 41st Virginia present after the action near Manassas fell under Major Minetree. Around September 5, the regiment crossed the Potomac River as part of Lee's invasion of Maryland, setting up camp near Frederick, Maryland on September 7, where it remained until September 12, when it crossed South Mountain with the rest of the brigade at Crampton's Gap and camped on the east side. Lee ordered Jackson to seize Harpers Ferry with one of his divisions, and Parham was instructed to lead Mahone's Brigade in defense of their rear.

On September 13, Special Order 191 fell into the hands of two Union soldiers, providing McClellan with Lee's battle plans, and giving him the confidence he needed to plan an offensive for the following day. William B. Franklin led the attack at Crampton's Gap and Parham was sent with two regiments from Mahone's Brigade to hold a defensive line, with the 41st Virginia in reserve. Franklin broke Parham's line about 5:00 pm, and reinforcements from the 41st and another brigade sent to help delayed him long enough that he did not move through the gap before night fell. Franklin decided not to attempt to drive them on September 15, and, after dark, the 41st crossed the Potomac on a pontoon bridge and spent the night in Halltown, Virginia, before moving to the fighting at Sharpsburg, Maryland.

On September 17, Anderson's Division was ordered into the ongoing battle around 9:00 am, taking up position in the center of the Confederate line, along a sunken road. Because Mahone's Brigade had taken heavy casualties at Crampton's Gap, it was appended to the brigade of Roger A. Pryor. The road became the center of a series of bloody Union attacks for the rest of the morning, and when Anderson was wounded, Pryor left to take lead the division. The four men commanding the brigade following his departure were all killed or wounded, and the fight degenerated into chaos.

By the end of the day, the 41st Virginia reported only 15 men present at roll call. On the morning of September 20, many of the men had returned and the regiment helped drive off a Union attack on the army's rearguard at Shepherdstown. While retreating, Parham received news that the Confederate Congress had confirmed his promotion to colonel. By early October, the regiment had moved to Winchester and 104 men answered roll call.

== The Rappahannock Line ==
The 41st Virginia moved with the division back to Culpeper. On November 16, the Army of the Potomac, now under Ambrose Burnside began moving south. Lee guessed that Burnside was planning an attack across the Rappahannock River and sent Anderson's Division and another division of Longstreet's corps to Fredericksburg on November 19. The 41st Virginia arrived at Salem Church along the Plank Road to the west of Fredericksburg on the evening of November 21. Burnside had been stationary in Falmouth, so Lee ordered the rest of Longstreet's corps and Jackson's corps to Fredericksburg as well. Over the next three weeks the regiment remained camped in the area at the ready, sleeping on the ground through heavy snows and waiting for the Union attack.

=== Fredericksburg ===
On December 11 at 4:30 am, the brigade, with Mahone returned, was ordered to Stanbury Hill to the north of Marye's Heights, and began digging in behind a canal. Throughout that day and the next, Burnside built pontoon bridges and crossed his army over to Fredericksburg. Beginning at 7:00 am on December 13, the Union army attacked. Throughout the day, the 41st Virginia laid flat to avoid the heavy artillery bombardment designed to keep them from reinforcing the Confederates on Marye's Heights. In the afternoon, while Burnside threw wave after wave of men at Marye's Heights, Colonel Parham sent Companies B and K under Lieutenant Charles Denoon of Company K forward to engage Union pickets.

Lee kept the army in defensive positions until December 16, but Burnside did not renew his attacks, and the 41st Virginia returned to Salem Church to spend a hard winter. After Burnside's aborted January offensive, Lee moved Mahone's Brigade to United States Ford in early February. The regiments of the brigade took turns standing guard and improving the road back to the Orange Turnpike. Throughout the winter efforts were made to improve the regiment, now numbering 305. Courts martial were convened to try crimes and Officers Review Boards aspired to weeding out incompetent officers, though the effect of both was to deprive the regiment of officers. Lieutenant Denoon acted as commander of Company B, and for a short time even as a battalion commander. In March, a new chaplain arrived and found the beginnings of a religious revival among the regiment, also reported by chaplains in other regiments.

=== Chancellorsville ===
In early April, Captain J.E. Tyler of the 12th Virginia Infantry lead a combined force of elements of his own company and the 41st Virginia to Germanna Ford on the Rapidan River to construct a bridge for the army's cavalry. On April 28, Tyler received word that Union soldiers had been spotted crossing the Rappahannock at Kelly's Ford and dispatched Captain James Smith, Jr. of the 41st Virginia's Company E with ten of his men to set up a picket line and provide the work crew with details. Smith brought his men to a forward position in the woods, but was surprised to find some of the vanguard of Henry Slocum's XII Corps already behind him and blocking his route back to the ford. Smith and his men managed to elude Slocum's men and crossed the Rapidan in a boat.

At Germanna Ford, Tyler's party was surprised by Slocum's men, but most made it to the south side of the river, and held off the advanced pickets until the lead regiment drew up a line of battle. Assuming Smith had been captured, he fell back the Germanna Road to its intersection with the Orange Turnpike at Wilderness Tavern. Not long after, Smith and his men caught up with the rest of the crew, and the two decided to send a reconnaissance party after dark, led by Smith. He returned around 1:00 am, with news that Slocum was at the ford in force, and they sent word to Mahone's headquarters at the Chancellor Mansion that the Union army was making a move on the Confederate left flank.

Lee continued to receive reports throughout April 29 on the size and disposition of the Army of the Potomac's flanking movement, and gave orders that resulted in the 41st Virginia forming up north of the Chancellor Mansion at the intersection of Ely's Ford Road and United States Ford Road in the rain, with the rest of Anderson's Division nearby. At 3:30 am, Union cavalry seized United States Ford, but Anderson overruled Mahone's plan to re-capture it. As morning broke, the division fell back to the Chancellor Mansion, and then down the Orange Turnpike, pursued by the V Corps division of George Sykes. In the afternoon, reinforced with soldiers from Jackson's corps, Anderson's division made a stand at a ridge that ran across the turnpike and spent the evening and night digging breastworks.

May 1, Jackson, in command with Longstreet away laying siege to Suffolk, ordered Anderson's Division to advance against Sykes' men down the turnpike. Mahone's Brigade formed a line north of the road, with the 41st Virginia anchoring the left flank on it and advanced to within about half a mile of the Chancellor Mansion after a day of hard fighting. The next morning, while Jackson made his historic flank march, Anderson's Division remained in place to hold the Union forces. Beginning at 3:30 pm, the division was moved south to replace Jackson's departing units and the regiment spent the evening supporting batteries on the Plank Road.

The conduct of the officers and men...deserve high commendation...[including] the Forty-first Virginia under the gallant Parham was everywhere, though less arduous, well and bravely performed.

— Brig. Gen. William Mahone, Official Report of Chancellorsville

The morning of May 3 found Anderson Division's left flank threatened by the III Corps of Daniel Sickles positioned on Hazel Grove, separating Anderson from the nearest Confederate units of Jackson, now led by J.E.B. Stuart because of Jackson's wounding. But beginning at 10:00 am, Sickles evacuated the position, and the Confederates spent mid-day pushing the Union forces back north of the Chancellor Mansion. Shortly after noon, Mahone's Brigade, with others from Anderson's Division, was ordered rapidly back to Salem Church, to stop the VI Corps of John Sedgwick that had broken through the weakened Confederate defenses at Marye's Heights. At 4:00 pm, Mahone's regiments fell into line north of the Plank Road and repulsed three charges, repeatedly shifting to the left as more Union forces arrived, and continuing until nightfall. The following morning, the 41st Virginia found itself on the extreme left, near Banks's Ford, and unable to take part in most of the day's fighting because of obstacles created by the terrain, and unable to impede Sedwick's retreat that night.

On May 5, the regiment returned to the Chancellor Mansion to take part in the assault on the remainder of the Union army, but their retreat called off the attack. They spent two more days there, receiving much needed supplies and their first cooked meals in nearly a week, then marched to Hamilton's Crossing, south of Fredericksburg. After Jackson's death on May 10, Lee decided to reorganize the army in anticipation of a new campaign, and on May 30, Anderson's Division joined the new Third Corps, Army of Northern Virginia under A.P. Hill.

== Gettysburg and its Aftermath ==
In early June, the First Corps under Longstreet and the Second Corps under Richard S. Ewell left Fredericksburg, while Hill's Third Corps remained to cover their movement. Mahone's Brigade replaced the brigade guarding Marye's Height on June 3 and experienced their most complete provisioning of the war. While stationed so close to downtown Fredericksburg, the 41st Virginia hosted a "block party" for the soldiers of the regiment and the residents of the town. On June 14, the brigade moved out and reached Culpeper by June 16. They continued marching north, reaching Berryville June 21 and camped in Charles Town the next night. The regiment crossed the Potomac at Shepherdstown on June 24 and by June 26 had crossed into Pennsylvania. The next evening they camped four miles east of Chambersburg on the road to Gettysburg.

On July 1, the first day of the battle, Anderson's Division spent the day waiting, interspersed with short marches towards Gettysburg. A crowded road and confused orders because of the unintended development of the battle resulted in very little progress for the division. Lee had committed to battle by evening and, after a brief rest, Anderson's Division made a night march to Gettysburg, arriving in the morning and taking up a position at the northern end of Seminary Ridge.

On the second day, Anderson's Division was only lightly engaged. For most of the day it did not take part in the assaults, only finally joining in Longstreet's en echelon attack at 6:00 pm. But Mahone's Brigade did not move forward with the rest of the division. Anderson sent a message to Mahone asking for him to being his attack, but Mahone declined to, for unknown reasons.

Throughout the morning of the third day, the 41st Virginia guarded artillery units taking part in the bombardment of Cemetery Ridge. Despite having been barely engaged so far, Anderson's Division was not selected to take part in a three division afternoon assault led by Longstreet. Known to history as "Pickett's Charge", it was a disaster, and Anderson's Division was spread down the line to cover its length as the three divisions under Longstreet made their way back to the main army.

Anderson's Division was given much of the responsibility for guarding the army's rear as it left the battlefield. By July 11, the army had reached Williamsport, but the recent heavy rains prevented it from crossing the Potomac. The 41st Virginia spent the next two days in the hastily constructed Confederate trenches anticipating a Union attack that did not occur. It finally crossed the river on July 14, though some of its men took the opportunity to desert. By July 21, the regiment was passing through Front Royal and camped in Culpeper on July 25.

== Bristoe and Mine Run ==
Throughout the summer, neither army was eager to engage in a large engagement again as both recovered from Gettysburg. On August 2, Mahone's Brigade and one other were called upon to support Jeb Stuart's cavalry in a minor skirmish with Union Cavalry near Brandy Station, but the Northerners retreated before a fight began. The regiment moved back south of the Rapidan to take up a position at Rapidan Station and face off across the river from the Army of the Potomac.

On October 8, Hill's Third Corps and Ewell's Second Corps attempted to reproduce Jackson's flanking maneuver of August 1862, but the Army of the Potomac slipped the trap. Hill assaulted a Union position on October 14, but due to improper reconnaissance were surprised by the II Corps under Gouverneur K. Warren and brutally repulsed. The 41st Virginia and the rest of Anderson's Division, who had been in reserve during the battle, took up a defensive position through the night, then joined the rest of the army as it retreated to south of the Rappahannock again. While there, a pardon came from the War Department for Privates Newton and Scroggins, who had been sentenced to death for desertion, prompting Lee to send a critical telegram back that leniency would only encourage more desertion. Mahone's Brigade was held in reserve to prevent a breakthrough during the Second Battle of Rappahannock Station on November 7, but did not take part in the battle. Shortly thereafter, the regiment returned to its old camp at Rapidan Station.

At 4:00 am on November 26, Colonel Parham ordered the regiment east on the Plank Road as part of the corps' movement to meet the Army of the Potomac's strike across the Rapidan. The 41st Virginia reached Verdiersville in Orange County at about 1:00 pm and formed a line with the rest of Anderson's Division, but moved it after dark to the woods between the Plank Road and the Orange Turnpike when another Third Corps division arrived. Throughout the next two days a steady, cold rain fell, but no Union attack came along the regiment's line. By November 30, Union forces appeared ready to charge the strong defensive position, but their commanders thought better of it and withdrew across the Rapidan. The corps pursued, but Lee called off the attack and, on December 3, the 41st Virginia was back in Rapidan Station.

== Grant's Overland Campaign ==
In late December, the regiment moved to a new camp at Madison Run Station, halfway between Gordonsville and Orange Court House to establish permanent winter quarters. During the winter, the 41st Virginia joined with the other units of Lee's army in a broad turn to religiousness that would have implications throughout the American south after the war. Also during this time, Colonel Parham developed an unidentified illness that forced him on sickleave for most of the winter, and, eventually, would lead to his transfer. Lt. Colonel Joseph P. Minetree effectively commanded the regiment. A much greater change of leadership had occurred in the Union army, when Ulysses S. Grant was named general-in-chief.

=== The Wilderness ===
On May 4, Grant ordered the Army of the Potomac across the Rapidan River at Germanna Ford. Lee rushed the Second Corps and Third Corps to meet him in the Spotsylvania Wilderness, but left Anderson's Division north of Clark's Mountain to defend against a possible envelopment. They remained on guard throughout May 5, receiving orders to move east on the Plank Road to the battlefield at 7:00 pm, reaching three miles west of the battlefield by just after dawn the next morning. But the division was halted, so Longstreet could bring his First Corps up the road and engage at Tapp Farm, the major action of the morning. Lee ordered several of Anderson's brigades forward to join Longstreet, but the counterattack ground to a halt against the Union II Corps, under Winfield Scott Hancock. Lee's chief engineer, Martin Luther Smith, had discovered a path down an unfinished railroad to Hancock's flank, and Longstreet ordered his chief of staff Moxley Sorrel to assemble what troops he could for an attack.

Sorrel assembled two brigades from Longstreet's corps and one from the Third Corps division of Henry Heth, as well as Mahone's Brigade for the assault. Mahone, as the senior brigadier, led the group off at about 11:00 am, crashing totally unexpected onto Hancock's flank about forty-five minutes later. As the Union flank crumpled, Longstreet ordered his men forward too, and a confused flight began among Hancock's troops. Lt. Colonel Minetree was wounded, and Mahone halted his brigade to reform before the chaos grew worse. The 12th Virginia continued advancing, though, until Colonel David A. Weisiger realized what had happened, and turned them around. As he marched them back to the line, Longstreet and several staff rode up on horses to investigate the delay. The 41st Virginia, Major William Etheridge now commanding, and the 61st Virginia confused the 12th Virginia with an attacking regiment and opened fire, killing several of them and severely wounding Longstreet.

The wounding of Longstreet effectively ended the Confederate counterattack and they took up positions around the II Corps' fallback defenses at the intersection of the Brock and Plank Roads. The next day was spent waiting for an attack or retreat by the Union forces. Anderson was placed in temporary command of the First Corps for the remainder of the battle, with Mahone temporarily taking charge of the division and the 12th Virginia's Colonel Wisiger leading the brigade. At about 7:00 pm, just after dark, Grant began to move the army.

=== Spotsylvania Court House ===
Lee discovered that Grant was not retreating, but trying to take up a defensive position between him and Richmond, and sent the First Corps under Anderson racing to beat him south, followed by Ewell's Second Corps. The Third Corps, temporarily under Jubal Early with Hill too sick to lead, followed down an abandoned road, reaching the rest of the army near Spotsylvania Court House on May 9 at 1:00 pm. At 4:00, Anderson's Division, under Mahone, was dispatched to stop an attack by Hancock across the Po River near Shady Grove Church, but Grant called off the Union attack before it could be exploited, and Mahone extended the Confederate trenches to his new position.

May 12, a massive Union assault on the "Mule Shoe" Salient required Lee to transfer Anderson's Division back to fill in holes created in the lines as he reinforced, and Mahone's Brigade, still under Weisiger, took up a position north of the Fredericksburg Road leading to Spotsylvania Court House. At around 1:00 pm, Ambrose Burnside's IX Corps advanced against the Second Corps to keep Lee from further reinforcing the Mule Shoe Salient, and Weisiger was ordered to take Mahone's Brigade with two others and counterattack on the IX Corps' flank. In the ensuing action, the 41st Virginia and the other regiments of the attack force blunted Burnside's attack long enough for Lee to re-establish a defensive line across the Mule Shoe Salient, and the brigades returned to their launching point in the trenches.

On May 16, the brigade again attempted to stop a Union flank maneuver, as Grant moved the VI Corps across the Ni River, but was overwhelmed by the forces under Horatio Wright. Lee had been able to deploy Anderson's First Corps to keep Grant from turning the flank, though, and the Union general-in-chief decided there was nothing more to be gained from attacks on the Confederate position. The 41st Virginia remained in its trenches, not participating in Ewell's failed offensive on the Union flank.

=== Cold Harbor ===
On May 20, Grant attempted to get between Lee and Richmond again, and again Anderson and Ewell led their corps south to stop him. The Third Corps, with Hill back in charge, did not leave Spotsylvania until 9:00 pm on May 21 and reached the Confederate position near Hanover Junction on the North Anna River on the night of May 23. Mahone's Brigade was stationed on the western edge of Lee's "Hog Snout" line. Throughout May 24, the regiment repulsed IX Corps attacks on their trenches, during which Captain Brinkley of Company I was killed. They remained in the trenches until the morning of May 27, when Grant again attempted a flank maneuver.

The 41st Virginia took up a position with the rest of a brigade halfway between Shady Grove Church and Pole Green Church behind Totopotomoy Creek, but most of Grant's fighting took place to its right. Then most of the Army of the Potomac disappeared from the line, and reappeared to the south, headed towards Cold Harbor on the road to Richmond, but were stopped there by Anderson. His Division, still being led by Mahone, was moved to support him as a reserve force. On June 3, Grant launched an all out attack on the Confederate lines and Major Etheridge led the 41st Virginia to reinforce the division of John C. Breckinridge as it bloodily repulsed the Union charge.

== Petersburg ==
Following the charge was a lull lasting slightly more than a week, punctuated by intermittent shelling and sharpshooter fire. During that time, Weisiger was made permanent commander of the brigade and Mahone permanent division commander, while the 41st Virginia still functioned under the command of Major Etheridge. Then Grant began a bold flank move to cross the James River and attack Petersburg, cutting off Richmond's supply lines. On June 13, Hill's Third Corps was sent to the old Seven Days' battlegrounds in White Oak Swamp to stop what turned out to be a diversionary strike towards Richmond. The real attack came on June 15 at Petersburg, but was repulsed by P.G.T. Beauregard, forcing Grant to lay siege.

The 41st Virginia arrived with Mahone's Division in Petersburg, the home of many of its men, sometime between June 18 and June 20. On June 21, the Union II Corps and VI Corps advanced to the Jerusalem Plank Road, with the plan to wreck the Weldon Railroad, one of the two remaining supply lines for Petersburg. The two corps became separated in the woods and on June 22, Mahone led his division down a ravine he personally knew from his job surveying the railroad before the war and appeared behind the left flank of the II Corps, collapsing it and sending the Union retreating to their fall back lines. In the attack, the 41st Virginia took two of the five stands of colors captured by the division. The following day, the division marched circuitously to join the division of Cadmus Wilcox and pushed the VI Corps back to the Jerusalem Plank Road. But Lee was unable to provide further reinforcements and the 41st Virginia with the rest of Mahone's Division fell back to the lines south of Petersburg.

Over the next month, the regiment was twice dispatched on small expeditions, but returned to the left flank of the army with no significant action each time. At dawn on July 30, the Union forces exploded a mine under the Confederate lines, beginning the Battle of the Crater. At 6:30 am, Mahone ordered Weisiger's Brigade and another from his division to plug the hole in the Confederate line. At 9:00 am, the regiment advanced with the rest of the brigade towards the Crater, but fell back under heavy fire and advanced to the left, into the occupied trenches. In heavy hand-to-hand combat, they drove the IX Corps soldiers from the trenches, while two other brigades assaulted the Crater, driving the Union from it in a bloody repulse, including a massacre of black soldiers. The regiment suffered heavy losses, including Captain Heslop Mingea of Company C, Captain Beverly Hunter of Company K, and Lieutenant Charles Denoon of Company K.

The regiment was held back from serious actions for the following two weeks to recover. On August 18, Grant made another attempt to wreck the Weldon Railroad, this time with the V Corps of Gouverneur Warren. Weisiger's Brigade, with one other, left the lines on August 19 and hit the left flank of the V Corps to the northeast of Globe Tavern. Warren brought up reinforcements, forcing Mahone to withdraw his two brigades. On August 21, the regiment with the rest of the brigade joined in another attack on Warren's position, this time from the west, but was driven off without achieving a breakthrough, leaving Warren in control of Globe Tavern, the new Union left.

During the August 22 attack on Hancock's II Corps at Ream's Station by Mahone, the 41st Virginia returned to the defenses south of Petersburg. Though Hancock retreated from Ream's Station, Warren's position at Globe Tavern cut the Weldon Railroad, but Lee was still able to move supplies from the railroad down the Boydton Plank Road. On October 27, Grant sent three corps to seize the road, and Mahone and Heth were sent to stop the attack. Mahone's Division advanced through the woods and collapsed the right flank of Hancock's II Corps on Dabney Mill Road. Veteran II Corps commanders rapidly changed their positions and surrounded Mahone's Division, driving the Confederates back with heavy losses. Hancock retreated, and the Confederates returned to their defenses on the Boydton Plank Road.

In December, the division participated in chasing Warren's V Corps as they wrecked further south on the Weldon Railroad during the Apple Jack Raid, then went into winter quarters. On February 5, Grant launched a joint cavalry and infantry expedition to destroy a Confederate wagon train thought to be on the Boydton Plank Road. After the Second Corps, now under John B. Gordon failed to dislodge the Union II Corps and V Corps, Lee sent Mahone's Division to flank the Union position. The attack failed, but both armies fell back to their defenses.

== Appomattox ==
Mahone's Division was moved to hold the lines between the James River and the Appomattox River after the action at Hatcher's Run. When the Union general assault of April 2 occurred, Mahone marched his division west through Chesterfield County and joined the rest of the army at Amelia Court House. On April 7, after Ewell's surrender the previous day at the Battle of Sayler's Creek, Mahone's Division held off the pursuing II Corps at the Battle of High Bridge, but was unable to successfully burn the bridge to prevent Union pursuit. That afternoon, the division took up position near Cumberland Church and held off two charges by the Union II Corps. Mahone's Division became part of Longstreet's Corps and fell back to a position north of Appomattox Court House. While preparing for an attack of the II Corps, the 41st Virginia received word of the cease-fire that would set the stage for the final surrender of Lee's army.

== See also ==
- List of Virginia Civil War units
