= W. A. Parham =

American Confederate State Army officer

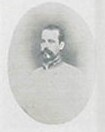
- The only known photograph of Parham
- Born: 1830; Sussex County, Virginia, United States
- Died: July 2, 1866 (aged 35–36); Warrenton, North Carolina, United States
- Military career
- Allegiance: Confederate States
- Branch: Confederate States Army
- Service years: 1861 – 1865
- Rank: Colonel
- Commands: 41st Virginia Infantry Regiment
- Conflicts: American Civil War: Peninsula campaign; Battle of Williamsburg; Battle of Seven Pines; Battle of Malvern Hill (WIA); Northern Virginia Campaign; Second Battle of Bull Run (WIA); Maryland campaign; Battle of Antietam (WIA); Chancellorsville campaign; Battle of Chancellorsville; Gettysburg campaign; Battle of Gettysburg; Bristoe campaign; Battle of Bristoe Station; Mine Run campaign; Battle of Mine Run

William Allen Parham (1830-1866) was a Confederate colonel who commanded the 41st Virginia Infantry Regiment and, briefly, Mahone's Brigade during the American Civil War.

== Biography ==
Parham was born around 1830 at Sussex County, Virginia and initially worked as a planter in Virginia. When the American Civil War broke out and Parham's home state seceded, Parham joined the Sussex Riflemen. He then enlisted as 1st Lieutenant of Company A of the 41st Virginia Infantry Regiment. He was later promoted to lieutenant colonel of the 41st Virginia on May 3, 1862, and would go on to participate at the Battle of Williamsburg. After that the 41st would be stationed at Petersburg, Virginia but wouldn't see any combat until the Battle of Seven Pines and the Battle of Glendale. Parham himself was injured at the Battle of Malvern Hill.

After his injury on his right iris, he was promoted to Colonel on July 25, 1862 and would go on to participate in the Second Battle of Bull Run. Parham would then serve in the Battle of Crampton's Gap. Afterwards he commanded William Mahone's Brigade during the Battle of Antietam before being wounded again in the latter. Parham's last major operation would be at the Battle of Chancellorsville and his final battles would be at the Battle of Gettysburg, the Battle of Bristoe Station and the Battle of Mine Run before it was finally realized that his health wouldn't be restored at all. Accordingly, he was transferred to Weldon, North Carolina, serving as provost marshal. During the later half of 1863, he attempted to run for the Confederate States Congress but failed to get admission. He would also serve as provost marshal at Richmond, Virginia in October 1864 and commanded the post at Hicksford, Virginia. On March 31, 1865, he was retired to the ´ Invalid Corps before surrendering at Raleigh on May 29, 1865. After the war, he retired to his wife's house at Warrenton, North Carolina before dying from his wounds at Malvern Hill on July 2, 1866.
