= David A. Weisiger =

Confederate States Army brigadier general (1818–1899)

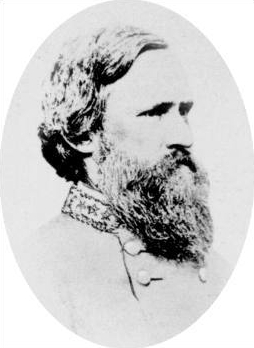
- Born: December 23, 1818; Chesterfield County, Virginia
- Died: February 23, 1899 (aged 80); Richmond, Virginia
- Burial place: Blandford Cemetery, Petersburg, Virginia
- Military career
- Allegiance: United States of America; Confederate States of America
- Branch: United States Army; Confederate States Army
- Service years: 1846–1848 (USA); 1861–1865 (CSA)
- Rank: Second Lieutenant (USV); Colonel (Virginia Militia); Brigadier General (CSA)
- Unit: 1st Virginia Volunteers (USV)
- Commands: 39th Virginia Militia Regiment; 12th Virginia Infantry Regiment; Weisiger's Brigade
- Conflicts: Mexican–American War; American Civil War
- Other work: Bank cashier

David Addison Weisiger (December 23, 1818 – February 23, 1899) was a Confederate States Army brigadier general during the American Civil War (Civil War). Weisiger served as a second lieutenant in the 1st Virginia Volunteers, an infantry regiment, during the Mexican–American War. After the war, he became a leading businessman in Petersburg, Virginia. Between 1853 and 1860, he served in the 39th Virginia Militia Regiment, rising from captain to colonel. After the Civil War, he was a bank cashier at Petersburg, Virginia and a businessman at Richmond, Virginia.

== Early and family life ==
David Addison Weisiger was born December 23, 1818, at "The Grove" in Chesterfield County, Virginia. His grandfather Joseph Weisinger had been born in Germany but became Petersburg's mayor in 1792; his father Samuel S. Weisiger became a judge.

Weisinger married at least twice. His first wife died in 1844 and their children never survived infancy. With his second wife, the former Alice Sydnor Barksdale (1835-1856), he had a son, Addison Sydnor Barksdale (1856-1920), who would likewise become a leading citizen of Petersburg.

== Virginia militia officer and commission merchant ==
During the Mexican–American War, Weisinger served in the 1st Virginia Volunteers Infantry Regiment as a second lieutenant of Company E from December 3, 1846, to August 1, 1848. After the war, he became a commission merchant at Petersburg, which was growing rapidly as a transportation hub and industrial center. By 1849, Weisinger was a leading Freemason, and helped to lay a monument honoring General George Washington in 1850 and was elected the lodge's treasurer in 1858. In the 1860 census, he owned 7 enslaved people (45 and 32 year old women and girls aged 14, 9, 8, 5 and an eight year old boy.

Weisinger served successively as captain, major and colonel of the 39th Virginia Militia Regiment between 1853 and 1860. Two Petersburg militia units traveled to Harpers Ferry to keep order during the trial of abolitionist John Brown; Weisinger was officer of the day at Brown's hanging, on December 2, 1859. Upon returning to Petersburg, he helped augment its militia forces, and three more units were recruited.

== Confederate officer ==
David A. Weisiger began his Confederate Civil War service shortly after Lincoln's election, when he accepted a commission as a major in the 4th Infantry Battalion of the Virginia Militia, replaced as the 39th Regiment's commanding officer by Colonel John M. Davenport, who celebrated the occasion and his new officer comrades in January. Shortly after the Virginia Secession Convention of 1861 voted for secession, on April 19, 1861, Weisiger swore in his militia companies into military service, but also wrote a complaint to Adjutant General William H. Richardson in Richmond about his shortage of rifles and especially cartridges and shot. Nonetheless, the next day, April 20, he took his battalion by rail to the Gosport Navy Yard at Norfolk, Virginia when after a train ruse by future Confederate general William Mahone, it was abandoned by the U.S. Navy. Weisinger's troops also occupied the nearby city of Norfolk. Weisinger formally became colonel of the 12th Virginia Infantry Regiment on May 9, 1861.

The regiment served on the Virginia Peninsula until it was attached to the brigade of then Brigadier General William Mahone in Major General Richard H. Anderson's division of III Corps of the Army of Northern Virginia. Weisiger fought at the Battle of Seven Pines and during the Seven Days Battles, taking a prominent part in the Battle of Glendale. He briefly took command of Mahone's brigade when Mahone was wounded at the Battle of Second Bull Run (Second Manassas) but in turn received a severe wound, from which recovery took until July 1863. Two of his captains were also wounded during Second Manassas, and Major John Pegram May killed, so on September 17, 1862 at the end of the Battle of Antietam, only 23 men of the 12th Virginia answered roll call. Weisinger took command of Mahone's brigade at the Battle of the Wilderness on May 7, 1864, following Mahone's wound the previous day. Weisiger commanded the brigade at the Battle of Spotsylvania Court House and the Battle of Cold Harbor. He was appointed brigadier general with temporary rank on May 31, 1864. This commission was confirmed June 7, 1864, but was canceled for lack of a vacancy.

When Mahone succeeded to division command upon Major General Richard H. Anderson's transfer to temporary command of Lieutenant General James Longstreet's corps. Weisiger remained in command of the brigade despite the initial cancellation of his promotion.

On July 30, 1864, during the Siege of Petersburg and under General Mahone's command, Weisinger's men went into counter-attack action at the Battle of the Crater with drill-order steadiness, and Wright's Georgian brigade and Sanders' Alabama brigade also cleared the Union troops stuck in the crater, causing 4,000 losses compared to 1500 Confederate casualties. Weisiger was wounded again in this battle. In recognition of his contribution to this Confederate victory (though the siege continued), Weisiger was appointed brigadier general from the date of the battle, July 30, 1864. Weisiger commanded a brigade in Mahone's division from June 4, 1864, to April 9, 1865. Thus during August 1864, he led the 6th Virginia Infantry, 12th Virginia Infantry, 16th Virginia Infantry and 61st Virginia Infantry and sometimes the 41st Virginia Infantry, which defended the Petersburg and Weldon Railroad, a major route for military transport and supplies into the besieged city, which the federals tried to break. Late that year, as a token of their esteem for his efforts, Petersburg citizens banded together to purchase a horse for Weisinger, although such had become very expensive as a result of the siege.

Weiginger was paroled at Appomattox Court House, Virginia on April 9, 1865. He had been wounded three times and had two horses shot from under him.

== Postwar, death and legacy ==
After the Civil War, Weisiger returned to Petersburg, Virginia where he was a bank cashier. Weisiger moved his business to Richmond, Virginia, where he died on February 23, 1899. He is buried at Blandford Cemetery, Petersburg, Virginia.

== See also ==
- List of American Civil War generals (Confederate)
- German-Americans in the Civil War
