= Battle of the Crater order of battle: Union =

The following Union Army units and commanders fought in the Battle of the Crater (July 30, 1864) of the American Civil War. The Confederate order of battle is listed separately.

== Abbreviations used ==
=== Military Rank ===
- LTG = Lieutenant General
- MG = Major General
- BG = Brigadier General
- Col = Colonel
- Ltc = Lieutenant Colonel
- Maj = Major
- Cpt = Captain
- Lt = Lieutenant

=== Other ===
- w = wounded
- mw = mortally wounded
- k = killed in action
- c = captured

== Union Forces ==
=== General in Chief ===
LTG Ulysses S. Grant, commander in chief

=== Army of the Potomac ===
MG George Meade

Provost Guard:
BG Marsena R. Patrick

- 1st Indiana Cavalry, Company K: Cpt Theodore Majtheny
- 1st Massachusetts Cavalry, Companies C & D: Cpt Charles Francis Adams, Jr.
- 80th New York: Col Theodore B. Gates
- 3rd Pennsylvania Cavalry, Companies A, B, & M: Maj James W. Walsh
- 68th Pennsylvania: Col Andrew H. Tippin
- 114th Pennsylvania: Col Charles H. T. Collis

Engineer Brigade:
BG Henry W. Benham

- 15th New York Engineers (5 companies): Maj William A. Ketchum
- 50th New York Engineers:
- Battalion U.S. Engineers: Cpt George H. Mendell

Signal Corps: Cpt Benjamin F. Fisher

Guards and Orderlies:

- Independent Company Oneida Cavalry (New York): Cpt Daniel P. Mann

==== IX Corps ====
MG Ambrose Burnside

Provost Guard:

- 8th United States: Cpt Milton Cogswell

Division	Brigade	Regiments and Others
First Division; BG James H. Ledlie	1st Brigade BG William F. Bartlett (c); Ltc Joseph H. Barnes	21st Massachusetts: Cpt William H. Clark (mw); 29th Massachusetts: Ltc Joseph H. Barnes, Cpt Willard D. Tripp; 56th Massachusetts: Col Stephen M. Weld (c), Cpt Charles D. Lamb; 57th Massachusetts: Maj Albert Prescott (k), Cpt Edson A Dresser (k), Lt Albert Doty; 59th Massachusetts: Col Jacob P. Gould (mw), Ltc John Hodges (k), Cpt Ezra P Gould; 100th Pennsylvania: Maj Thomas J. Hamilton (mw), Cpt Walter Oliver (k), Cpt Joseph H. Pentecost
First Division; BG James H. Ledlie	2nd Brigade Col Elisha Marshall (c); Ltc. Gilbert P. Robinson	3rd Maryland (4 companies) : Ltc Gilbert P. Robinson, Cpt David J. Weaver; 14th New York Heavy Artillery: Maj Charles Chipman; 179th New York (7 companies): Maj John Barton (k), Cpt Albert A. Terrill; 2nd Pennsylvania Provisional Heavy Artillery: Ltc Benjamin G. Barney (w), Cpt James W. Haig
First Division; BG James H. Ledlie	Acting Engineers	35th Massachusetts: Cpt Clifton A. Blanchard
Second Division; BG Robert B. Potter	1st Brigade Col Zenas Bliss	36th Massachusetts: Cpt Thaddeus L. Barker; 58th Massachusetts: Cpt Charles E. Churchill; 2nd New York Mounted Rifles: Col John Fisk; 45th Pennsylvania: Cpt Theodore Gregg; 48th Pennsylvania: Ltc Henry Pleasants; 4th Rhode Island: Lt Col Martin Buffum ( c), Maj James T. P. Bucklin
Second Division; BG Robert B. Potter	2nd Brigade BG Simon Goodell Griffin	31st Maine: Lt Col Daniel White (c), Cpt James Dean; 32nd Maine: Cpt Joseph B. Hammond; 2nd Maryland: Cpt James H. Wilson; 6th New Hampshire: Cpt Samuel G. Goodwin; 9th New Hampshire: Cpt John B. Cooper; 11th New Hampshire: Cpt Arthur C. Locke; 17th Vermont: Cpt Lyman E. Knapp
Second Division; BG Robert B. Potter	Acting Engineers	7th Rhode Island: Cpt Percy Daniels
Third Division; BG Orlando B. Willcox	1st Brigade BG John F. Hartranft	8th Michigan: Maj Horatio Belcher; 27th Michigan (1st & 2nd Companies Michigan Sharpshooters attached): Cpt Edward S. Leadbeater; 109th New York: Col Isaac S. Catlin (w), Cpt Edwin Evans; 13th Ohio Cavalry (dismounted): Col Noah H. Nixon; 51st Pennsylvania: Maj Lane S. Hart; 37th Wisconsin: Col Samuel Harriman; 38th Wisconsin (5 companies): Ltc Colwert K. Pler
Third Division; BG Orlando B. Willcox	2nd Brigade Col William Humphrey	1st Michigan Sharpshooters: Col Charles V. DeLand (w), Cpt Elmer Dicey (c), Cpt George Murdoch; 2nd Michigan: Cpt Ebenezer C. Tulloch; 20th Michigan: Ltc Byron M. Cutcheon; 24th New York Cavalry (dismounted): Ltc Walter C. Newberry; 46th New York: Cpt Alphons Serviere; 60th Ohio (9th & 10th Companies Ohio Sharpshooters attached): Maj Martin Avery; 50th Pennsylvania: Ltc Edwin Overton, Jr.
Third Division; BG Orlando B. Willcox	Acting Engineers	17th Michigan: Col Constant Luce
Fourth Division; BG Edward Ferrero	1st Brigade Ltc Joshua K. Sigfried	27th U.S. Colored Troops: Ltc Charles J. Wright; 30th U.S. Colored Troops: Col Delevan Bates; 39th U.S. Colored Troops: Col Ozora P. Stearns; 43rd U.S. Colored Troops (7 companies): Ltc H. Seymour Hall
Fourth Division; BG Edward Ferrero	2nd Brigade Col Henry Goddard Thomas	19th U.S. Colored Troops: Ltc Joseph G. Perkins; 23rd U.S. Colored Troops: Col Cleaveland J. Campbell (w); 28th U.S. Colored Troops (6 companies): Ltc Charles S. Russell; 29th U.S. Colored Troops: Ltc John A. Bross †; 31st U.S. Colored Troops: Ltc W. E. W. Ross
Fourth Division; BG Edward Ferrero	Artillery Brigade Ltc J. Albert Monroe	2nd Battery Maine Light Artillery: Cpt James A. Hall; 3rd Battery Maine Light Artillery: Cpt Ezekiel R. Mayo; 7th Battery Maine Light Artillery: Cpt Adelbert B. Twitchell; 11th Battery Massachusetts Light Artillery: Cpt Edward J. Jones; 14th Battery Massachusetts Light Artillery: Cpt Joseph W. B. Wright; 19th Battery New York Light Artillery: Cpt Edward W. Rogers; 27th Battery New York Light Artillery: Cpt John B. Eaton; 34th Battery New York Light Artillery: Cpt Jacob Roemer; Battery D, Pennsylvania Light Artillery: Cpt George W. Durrell; 3rd Battery Vermont Light Artillery: Cpt Romeo H. Start; Mortar Battery: Cpt Benjamin F. Smiley

=== Army of the James ===
MG Benjamin F. Butler

Siege Artillery: Col Henry L. Abbot

- 1st Connecticut Heavy Artillery: Col Henry Larcom Abbot
  - Company A: Cpt Edward A. Gillet
  - Company B: Cpt Albert F. Booker
  - Company M: Cpt Franklin A. Pratt

==== XVIII Corps ====
MG Edward Ord

===== X Corps =====
(attached to XVIII Corps)

Division	Brigade	Regiments and Others
Second Division; BG John Wesley Turner	1st Brigade Col Newton Martin Curtis	3rd New York: Cpt George W. Warren; 112th New York: Ltc John F. Smith; 117th New York: Ltc Rufus Daggett; 142nd New York: Ltc Albert M. Barney
Second Division; BG John Wesley Turner	2nd Brigade Ltc William B. Coan	47th New York: Cpt Charles A. Moore; 48th New York: Maj Samuel M Swartwout (k), Cpt Joseph Taylor; 76th Pennsylvania: Maj William S. Diller; 97th Pennsylvania: Cpt Isaiah Price
Second Division; BG John Wesley Turner	3rd Brigade Col Louis Bell	13th Indiana (3 companies): Lt Samuel M. Zent; 9th Maine: Cpt Robert J. Gray; 4th New Hampshire: Cpt Joseph M Clough (w), Cpt Frank W. Parker; 115th New York: Ltc Nathan J. Johnson; 169th New York: Maj James A. Colvin

== See also ==
- Virginia in the American Civil War
- Petersburg National Battlefield
