= Confederate States Army revival =

Series of Christian revivals

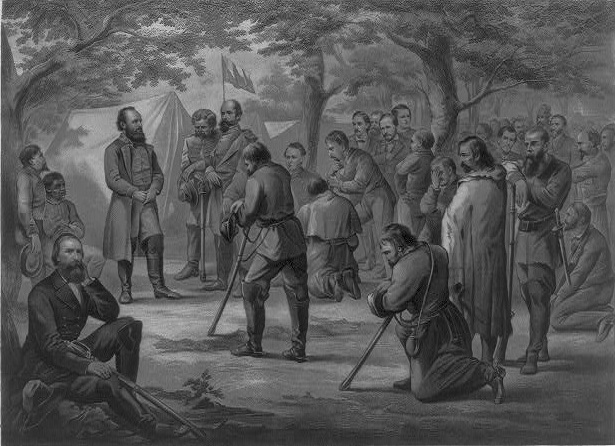
Prayer in "Stonewall" Jackson's camp, 1866.

The Confederate States Army revival was a series of Christian revivals which took place among the Confederate States Army in 1863. It is generally regarded as part of the Third Great Awakening.

Benjamin R. Lacy suggests that the revival began in the camps and hospitals around Richmond, Virginia. The revival began in the Army of Northern Virginia in early 1863. In March 1863, for example, a new chaplain arrived at the 41st Virginia Infantry regiment and found the beginnings of a revival. The revival was encouraged by Stonewall Jackson and Robert E. Lee and, by mid-1863, it had spread to all the Confederate armies. Mark Summers argues, however, that Jackson and Lee were exceptional as far as enthusiasm among the officers went, and rather than a "top down" revival (the traditional Lost Cause of the Confederacy view), it was much more "bottom up", as thousands of religious tracts were distributed among the soldiers. Summers suggests that due to the Union blockade, the soldiers had little else to read.

According to the Confederate chaplain J. William Jones, by the end of the war, 150,000 soldiers had been converted. Kurt O. Berends argues that the revivals were a major cultural event. Ben House suggests that the revivals provided "the spiritual resources that would be necessary to enable the South to survive defeat and Reconstruction with a strong Bible base still intact."
