= 12th Virginia Infantry Regiment =

- Flag of Virginia, 1861
- Active: July 1861 – Spring 1865
- Disbanded: April 1865
- Country: Confederate States of America
- Allegiance: Virginia
- Branch: Confederate States Army
- Type: Regiment
- Role: Infantry
- Engagements: American Civil War: Drewry's Bluff; Seven Days' Battles; Second Battle of Manassas; Battle of Crampton's Gap; Battle of Sharpsburg; Battle of Fredericksburg; Battle of Chancellorsville; Battle of Gettysburg; Siege of Petersburg; Battle of Appomattox Court House

Commanders
- Notable commanders: William Mahone; William E. Cameron

The 12th Virginia Infantry Regiment was an infantry regiment mostly raised in Petersburg, Virginia, for service in the Confederate States Army during the American Civil War, but with units from the cities of Norfolk and Richmond, and Greensville and Brunswick counties in southeastern Virginia. It fought mostly with the Army of Northern Virginia.

The 12th Virginia was organized at Norfolk in May, 1861, using the 4th Battalion Virginia Volunteers as its nucleus. Its members were mostly from Petersburg, with some men from Richmond and Norfolk. The regiment initially protected the main ports at Norfolk and Petersburg.

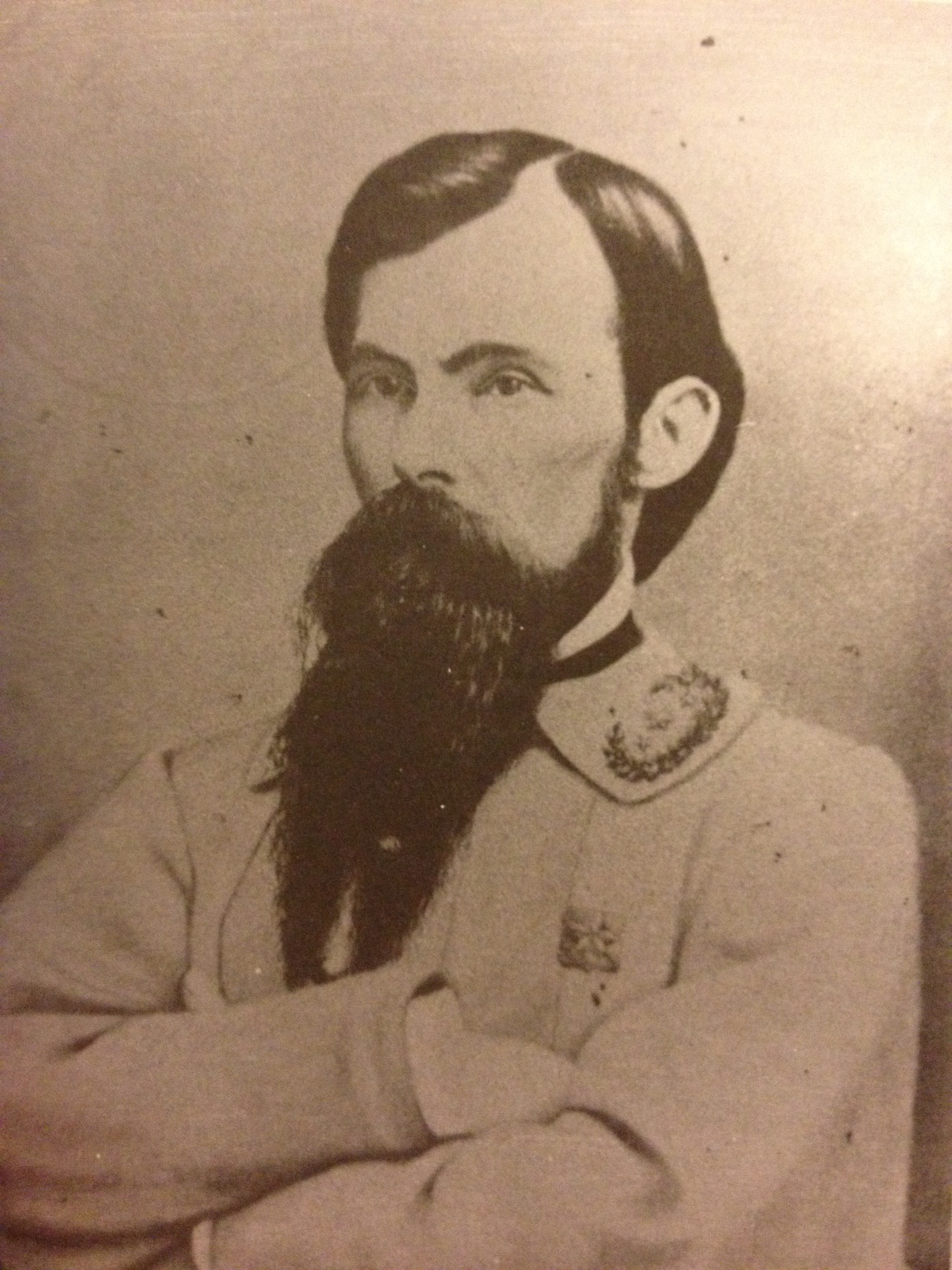
General William Mahone

In response to the federal Peninsular Campaign in the spring 1862, it joined General William Mahone's Brigade in the Army of Northern Virginia, then participated in many conflicts from Seven Pines to Wilderness. It was involved in the nearly year-long Siege of Petersburg, and conclusion of the Appomattox Campaign.

The field officers were Colonels Everard M. Feild and David A. Weisiger; Lieutenant Colonels John R. Lewellen and Fielding L. Taylor; and Majors Edgar L. Brockett, Richard W. Jones, and John P. May. Future Virginia governors William E. Cameron and William Hodges Mann served in the 12th Virginia. Cameron had been a staff officer under Gen. Mahone and won election as a member of the Readjuster Party. Mann would be the last governor of Virginia to have fought in the Civil War.

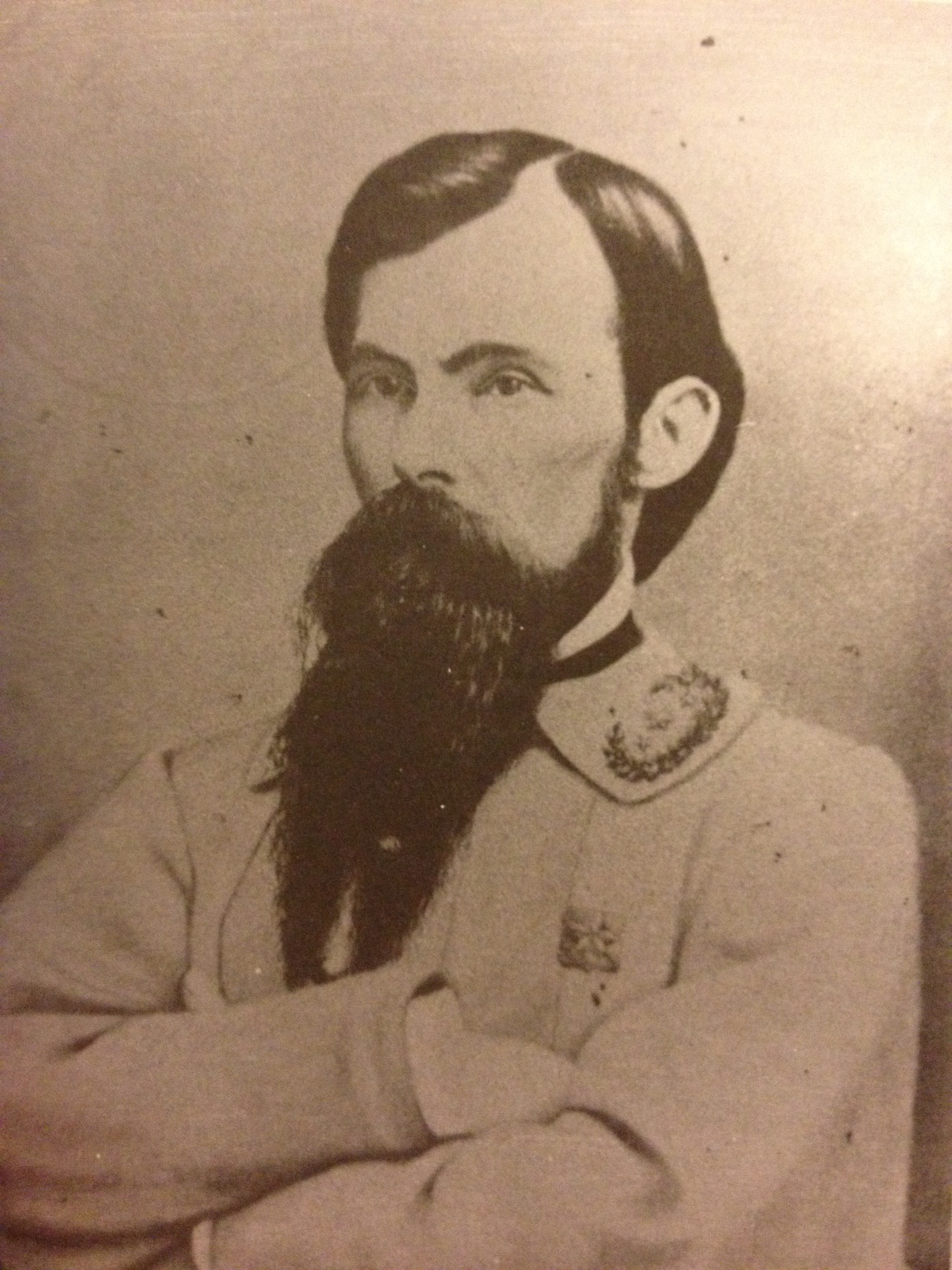
General Mahone

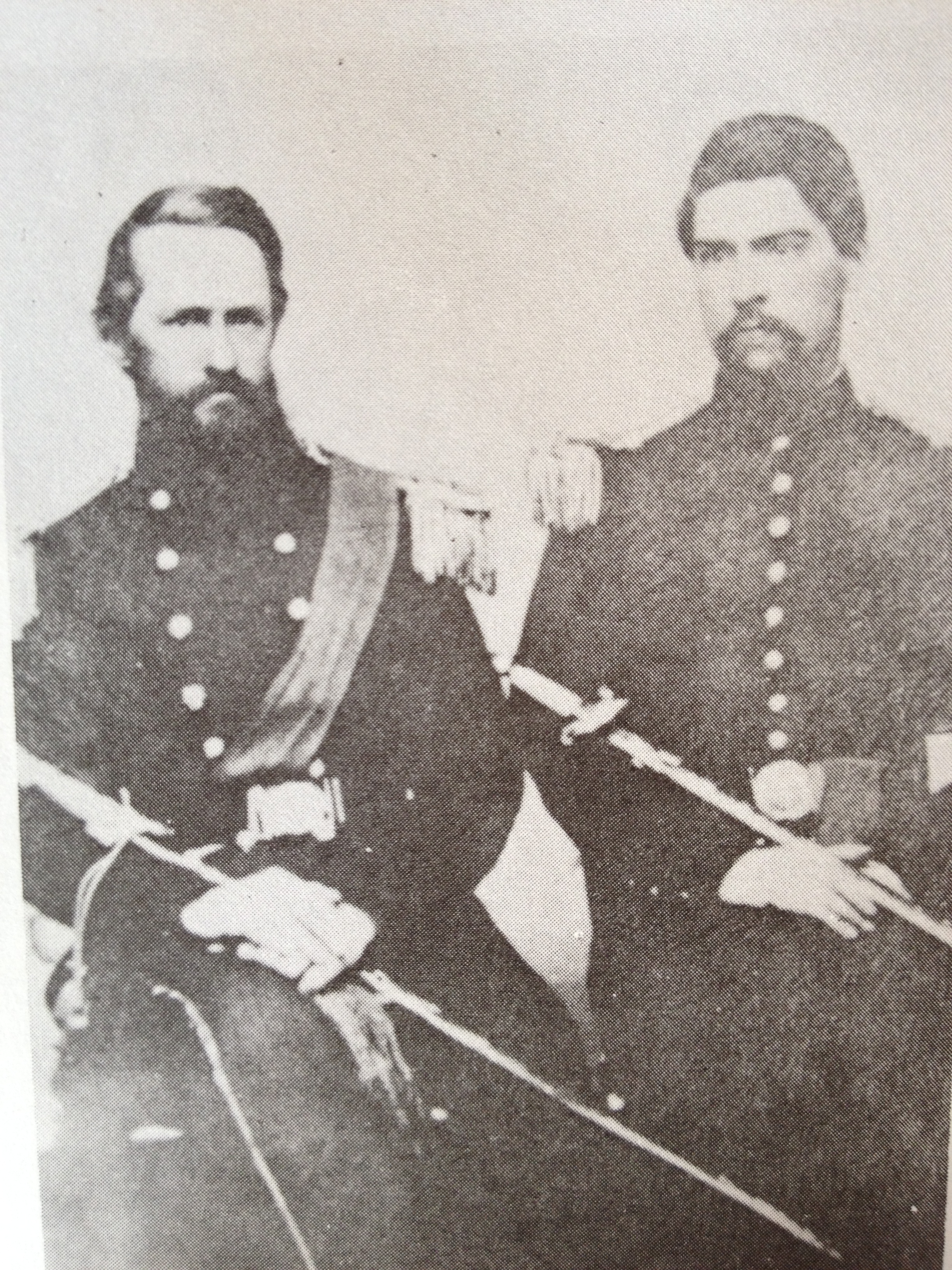
Colonel D. A. Weisiger on left, with Lt. Louis Leoferick Marks in 1860.

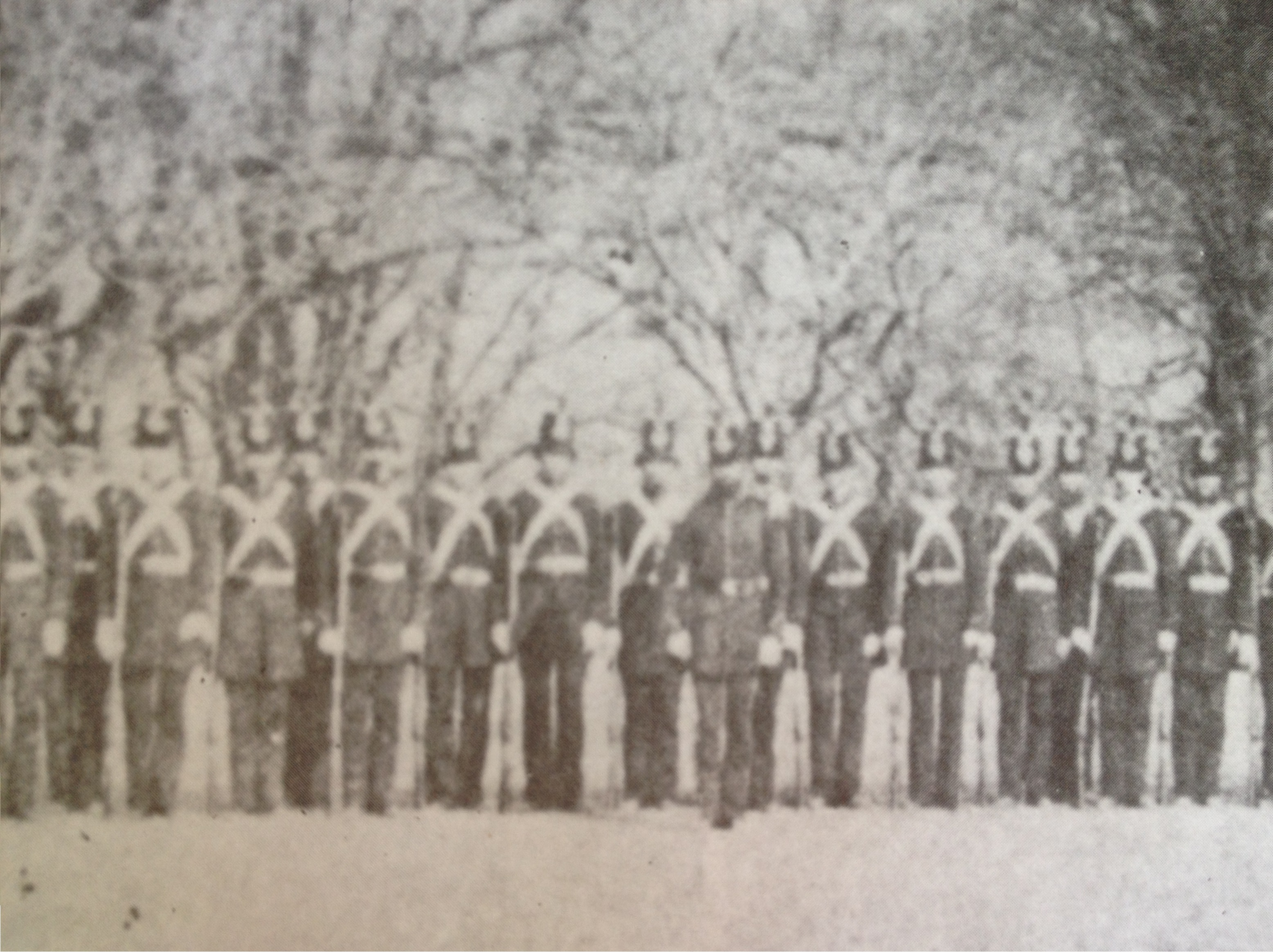
Petersburg City Guard in formation at Poplar Lawn Petersburg, Va. February 1861. Capt. J. P. May front center.

== Companies ==
By 1860, the Petersburg City Guard (that became Company A) was led by Col. David Weisiger, associated with the commission merchant firm John Rowlett and Company. He also was a prominent Freemason, the grand commander of the Appomattox Commandery, Knights Templar No. 6. Company A formally enlisted in the Virginia militia on April 19, 1861, shortly after the Virginia Secession Convention of 1861 approved a secession resolution. The Petersburg City Guard and the older established militia company, the Petersburg Grays (Company B) had been sent to Harper's Ferry, Virginia in 1859 to guard against civil unrest during the trial and execution of abolitionist John Brown.

Upon their return, Petersburg expanded the Old Grays, and formed another unit, dubbed the "new" Petersburg Grays (Company C). Three additional companies were recruited within the city and began training. The Lafayette Guards became Company D, and the Petersburg Riflemen became Company E. Eventually, all five Petersburg companies would become part of this unit, and would be joined by companies from Norfolk (a militia unit dating from 1802) and Richmond (a militia unit formed in 1844). In March 1862, before this regiment's combat service began, many men transferred from the Lafayette Guards into the new Petersburg Artillery (under Captain Branch), so that unit received many recruits from rural Patrick County in southwest Virginia. The final Petersburg-recruited company, "Archer's Rifles" was raised in May 1861 by Fletcher H. Archer, who had commanded a volunteer company in the Mexican War. Archer soon became lieutenant colonel of the 3rd Virginia Infantry Regiment, while his company became Company K of the 12th Virginia Infantry.

The regiment was unusual in the Confederate army as a whole, because most of its members were educated and from cities, only Companies F and I were from rural counties (both served by a railroad line from Petersburg). The Huger Grays (Company F) and Meherrin Grays (Company I) were recruited mainly from Greensville and Brunswick Counties. The Richmond Grays had been Company A of the 1st Virginia Infantry, but became Company G of the 12th Virginia on July 12, 1861. The oldest militia volunteers in Norfolk (founded in 1802), the Norfolk Junior Volunteers enlisted on April 19, 1861, for one year. When their home city fell to the Union Army & Navy in 1862, many deserted and rejoined their families. On July 1, 1861, this company was transferred from the 6th Virginia Infantry Regiment, to become Company H of the 12th Virginia Infantry.

Sortable table
Company	Nickname	Recruited at	First Commanding Officer
A	Petersburg City Guard	Petersburg	Colonel David A. Weisiger
B	Petersburg Old Grays	Petersburg	David Edmundson
C	Petersburg New Grays	Petersburg	Thomas H. Bond
D	Lafayette Guards	Petersburg	William H. Jarvis
E	Petersburg Riflemen	Petersburg	Daniel Dodson
F	Hugar Grays	Greensville; Brunswick County	Everard M. Feild
G	Richmond Grays	Richmond	
H	Norfolk Juniors	Norfolk	A.F. Santos; Finlay T. Ferguson
I	Meherrin Grays	Greensville; Brunswick County	Richard W. Jones
K	Archer Rifles	Petersburg	Fletcher Archer

One soldier reminisced about their first assignment after their April 1861 enlistment, a train ride to Norfolk.

The next morning I volunteered in the "B" Grays of Petersburg, and on the 20th of April, 1861, we boarded a train en route to Norfolk. Our organization was then known as the "Petersburg Battalion," comprising two companies of Grays (A and B), each 108 men, the "City Guard," "Petersburg Rifles," "The Lafayette Guards," and the "Nichols Battery of Artillery," The whole of Petersburg seemed to have turned out on that eventful April morning to bid us farewell, and mingled with tears, banners and handkerchiefs waving, we sped away over the Petersburg and Norfolk Railroad, as it was then known.

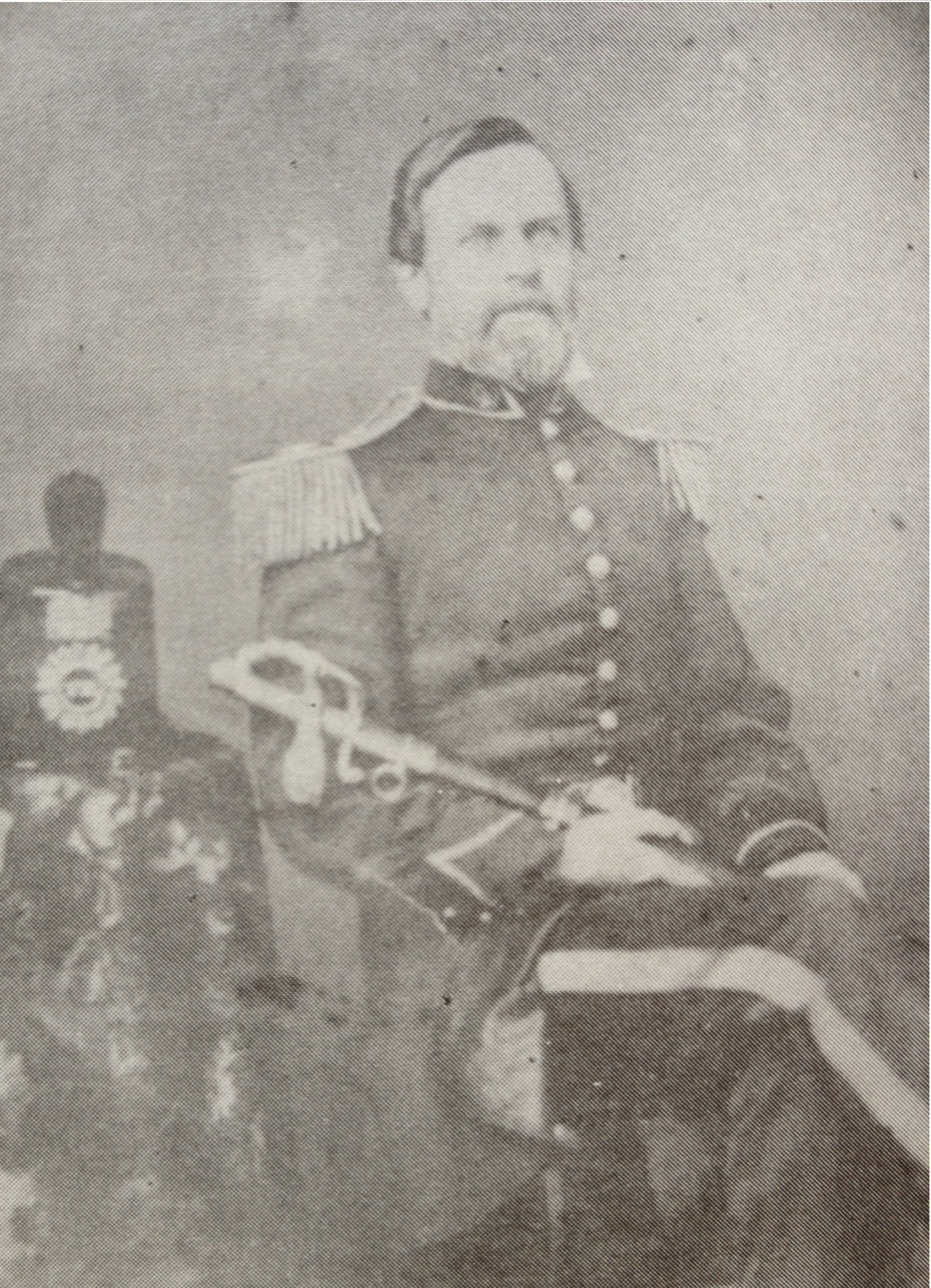
Capt. Daniel Dodson of the Petersburg Riflemen, dress uniform c. 1861.

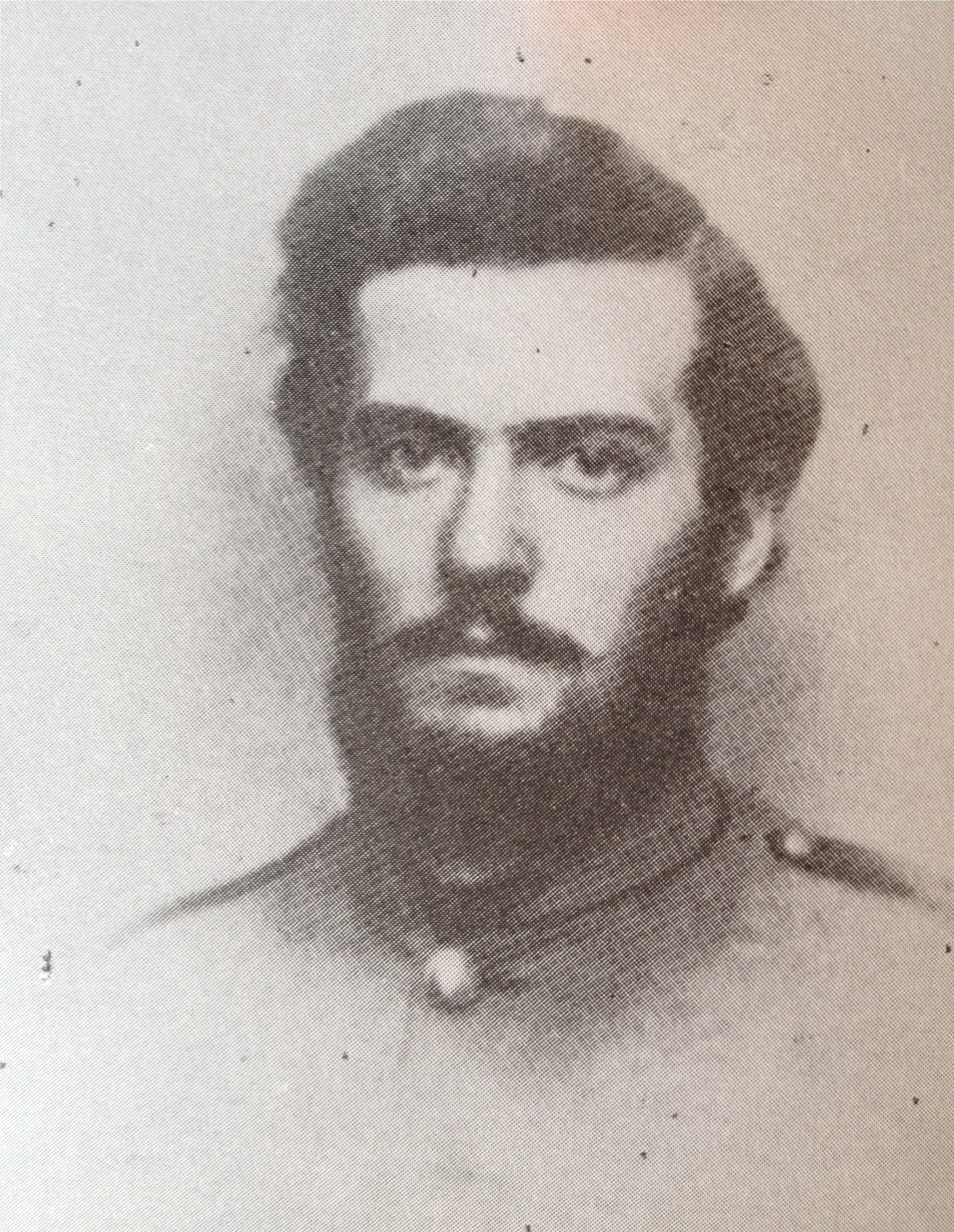
Pvt. William Thomas Morgan, Petersburg Riflemen

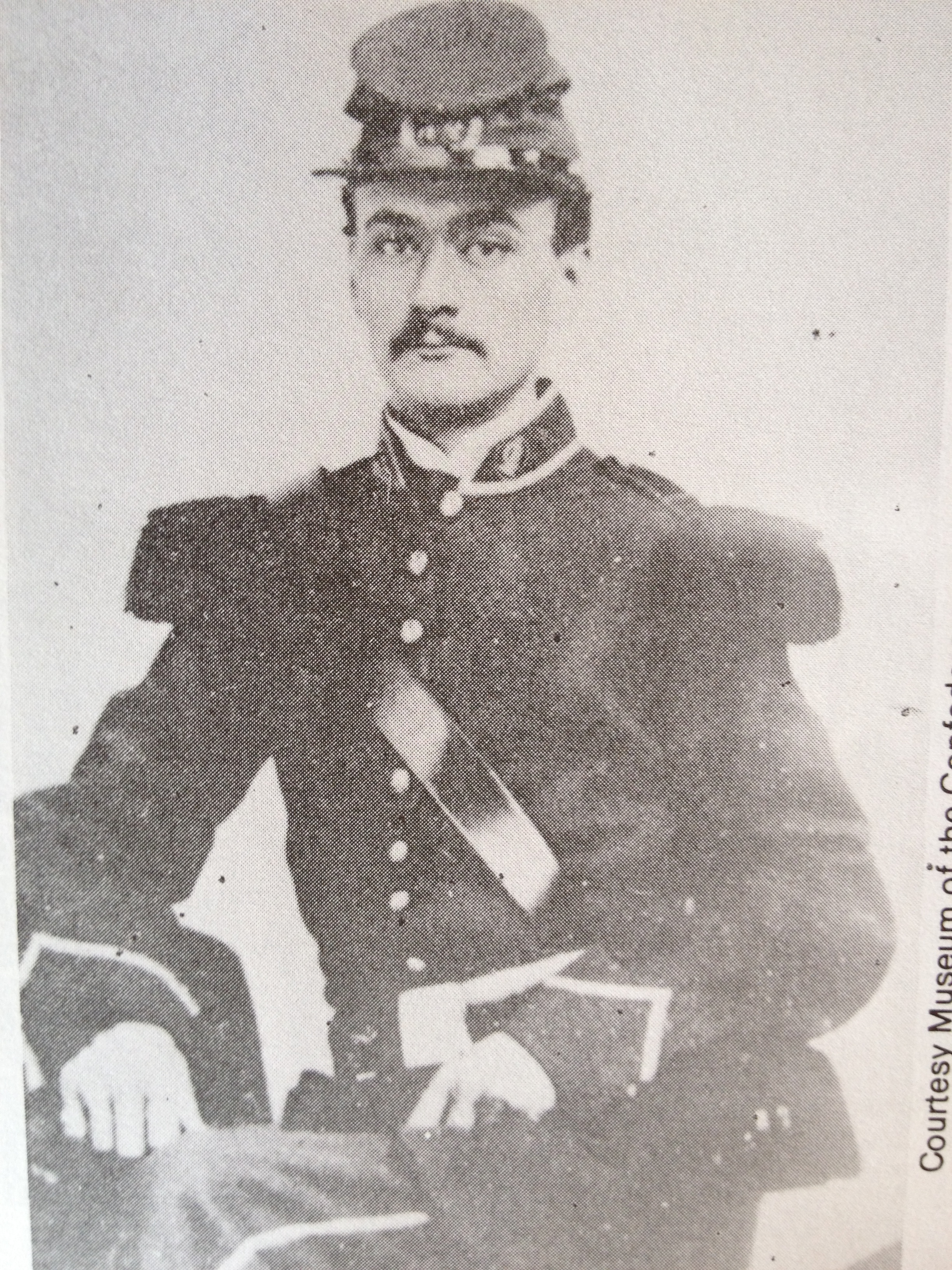
Pvt. Robert S. J. Peebles, Petersburg Riflemen, 1861

== Uniforms during the war ==
Throughout the war, the regiment went through inconsistent reequipping, tending to leave the men with proper accoutrements and weapons, but without uniforms. The men were first supplied by the City of Petersburg, in April 1861, with new grey uniforms. However, that would be the only equipment that would be distributed throughout the regiment, until Christmas of 1862, again by the City Council of Petersburg. The men captured the weapons off of the dead and wounded U.S. Soldiers from the Seven Days Battles, and had little proper clothing during the winter of 1862-1863, even into the spring. The 12th Virginia, again took new equipment from the federal dead at the Battle of Chancellorsville, but there is no mention of new uniforms issued even after the Battle of Gettysburg.

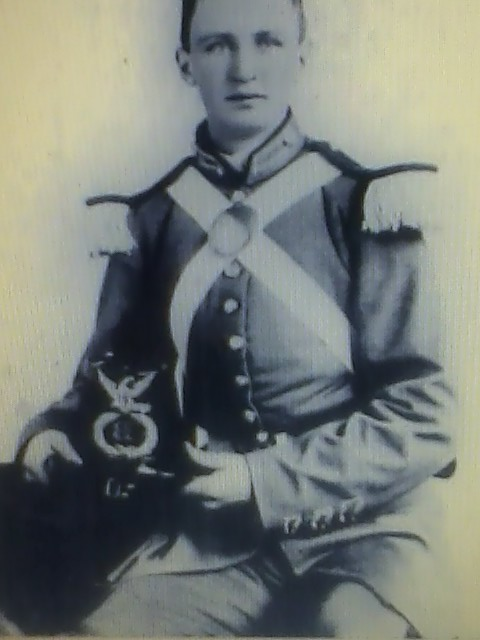
Pvt. McKensie Dunlop in his dress uniform in 1861.

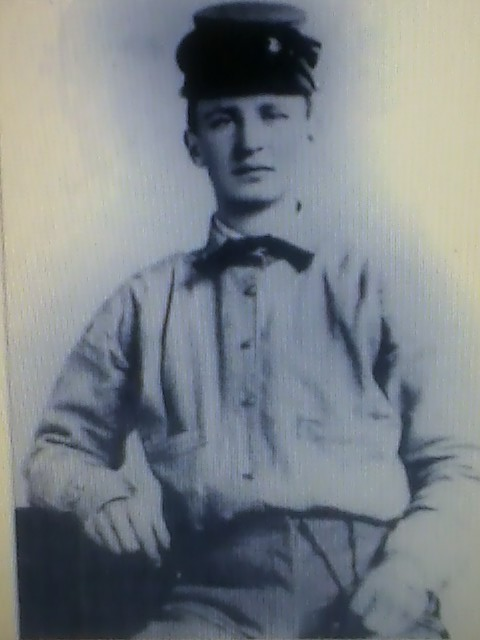
Pvt. McKensie Dunlop in his fatigue uniform in 1861.

== Timeline of events ==
=== Formation of the regiment ===
The majority of the Regiment came from the cities and received formal education, unlike the majority of Confederate Army units, whose ranks consisted mainly of country men.

- 1802, The Norfolk Juniors formed, being the oldest militia company in the city, would join the 12th Virginia in July 1861, as Company H.
- 1828, The Petersburg Greys organized, which eventually fought through the Mexican War under the command of Captain Fletcher Archer.
- 1844, The Richmond Greys formed, and joined the 1st Virginia Infantry, as Company A, and later transferred to the 12th Virginia.
- 1852, Captain John Pegram May organized the Petersburg City Guard. These two companies formed the 39th Regiment, Virginia State Militia, during the 1850s.
- December 2, 1859, Both the Petersburg Greys and the Petersburg City Guard were part of the security detail at the hanging of John Brown. On the return from the execution, the second company of the Petersburg Greys was formed by Thomas H. Bond. William Jarvis formed the Lafayette Guards the same year. A prominent lawyer in the city of Petersburg, Daniel Dodson, also organized the Petersburg Riflemen.
- 1860, The Commonwealth of Virginia began organizing the militia companies across the state, with this, the 4th Battalion, Virginia State Militia, was formed: with Co A, the Petersburg City Guard; Co B, the Old, and Co C, the New Petersburg Greys; Co D, the Lafayette Guards; and Co E, the Petersburg Riflemen; forming the unit. The Petersburg Riflemen had purchased new English manufactured Enfield, .577 caliber rifles, when the rest of the unit carried the old flintlock-conversion muskets, and older cap-lock muskets.
- 1861
  - April 17, Virginia voted for secession from the union. Following this, on April 19, Governor John Letcher called for volunteers. The 4th Battalion went into camp at Poplar Lawn in Petersburg.
  - April 20, The Battalion left Petersburg to Norfolk, for an occupation of the city and the military bases.
  - June 12, The Confederate Government redesignates the 4th Battalion, as the 12th Regiment, Virginia Infantry.
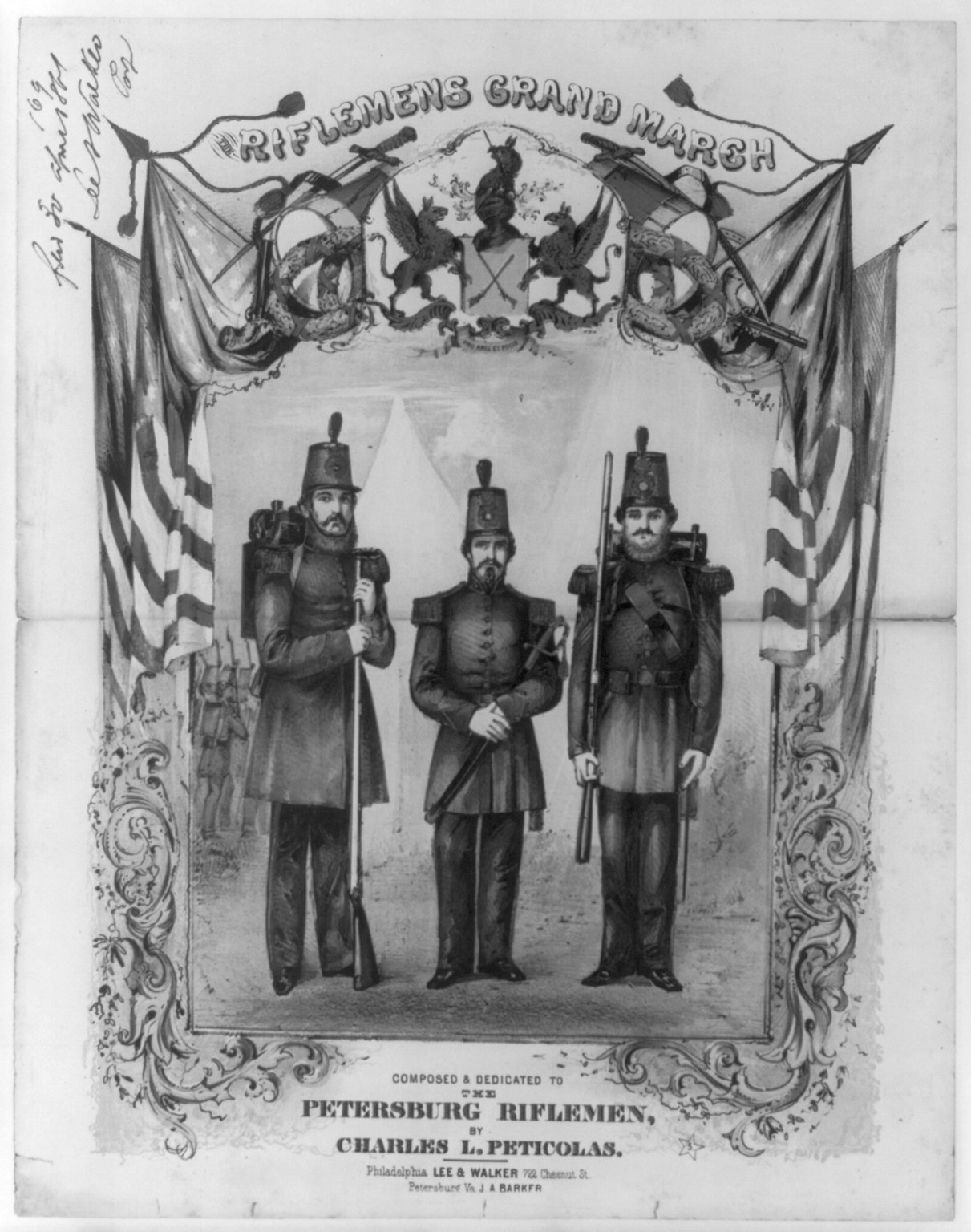
Riflemens Grand March, 12th Virginia Infantry Regiment

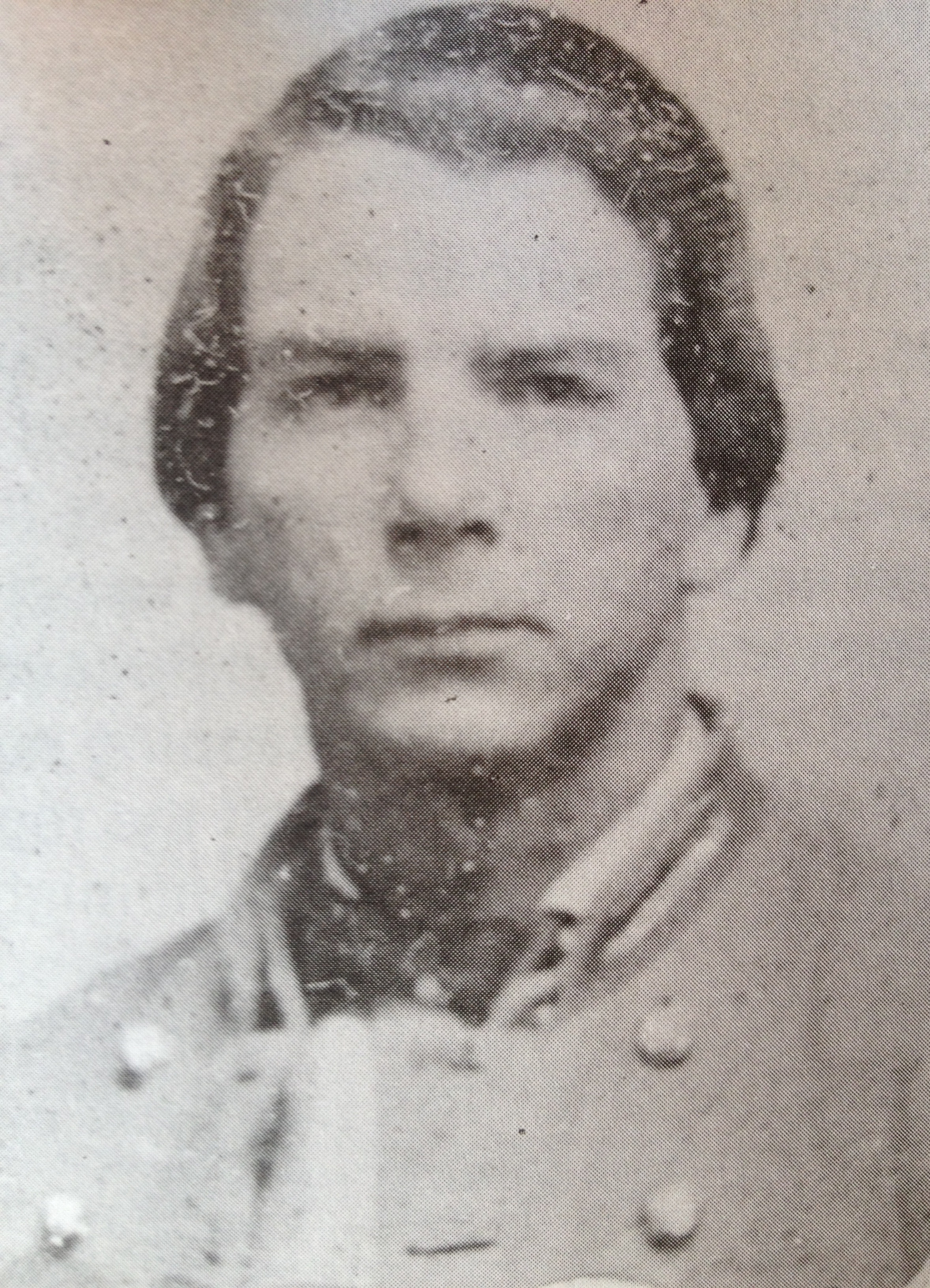
Lt. Francis M Wright, Co. A 12th Virginia

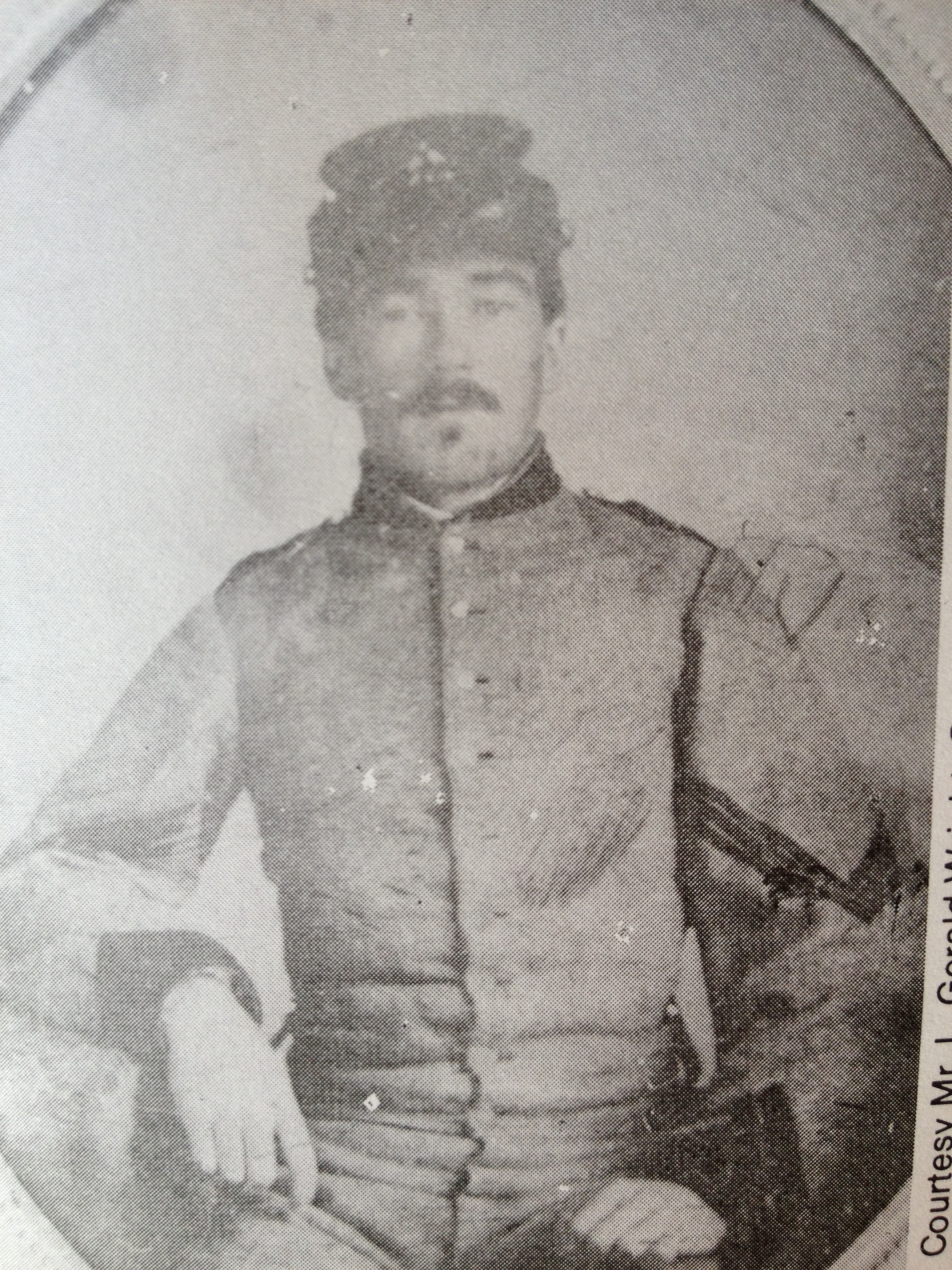
Unknown Sergeant of the 12th Virginia Infantry

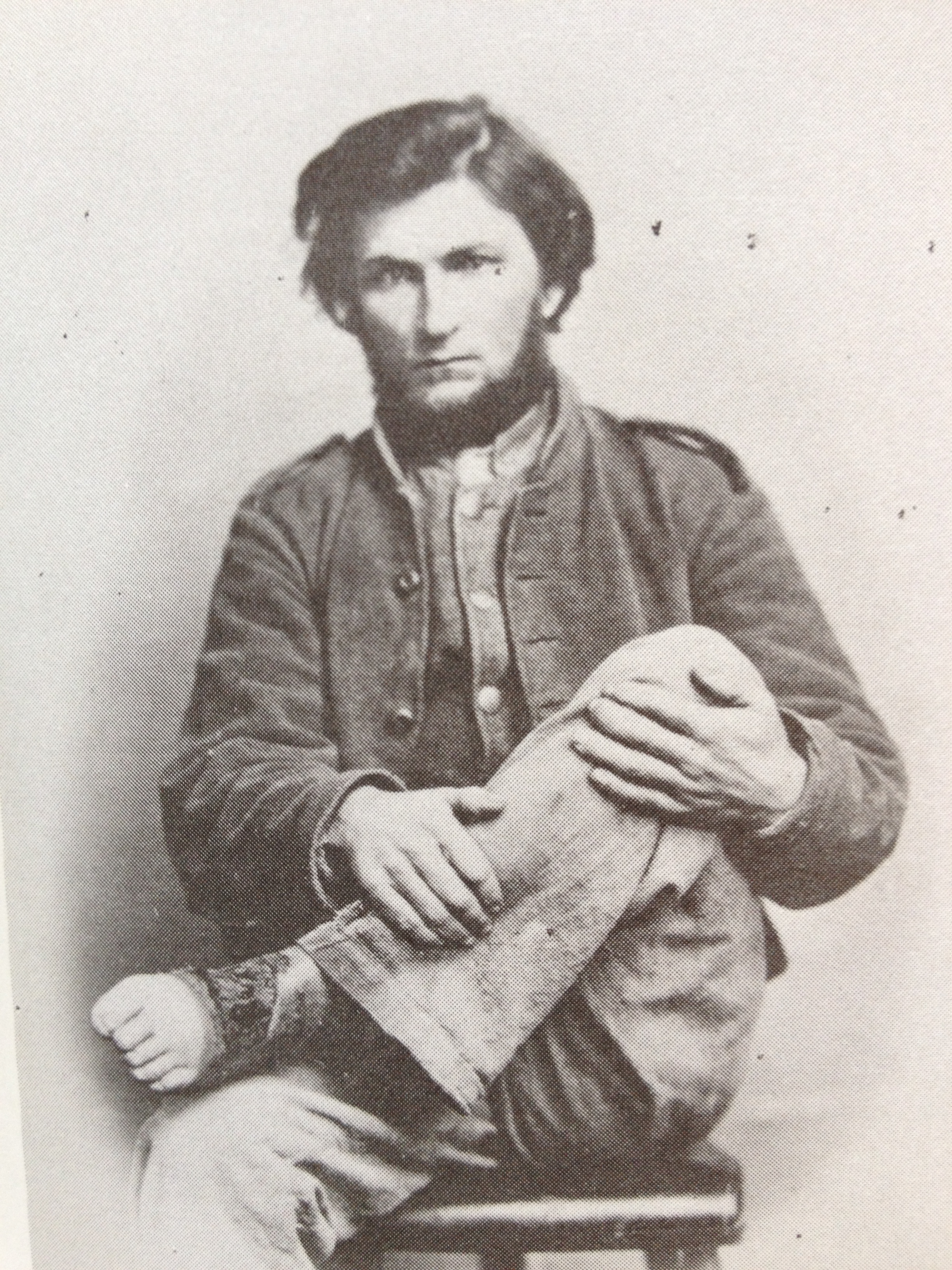
Pvt. Joseph Gray, late October 1864, after the Battle of Burgess' Mill.

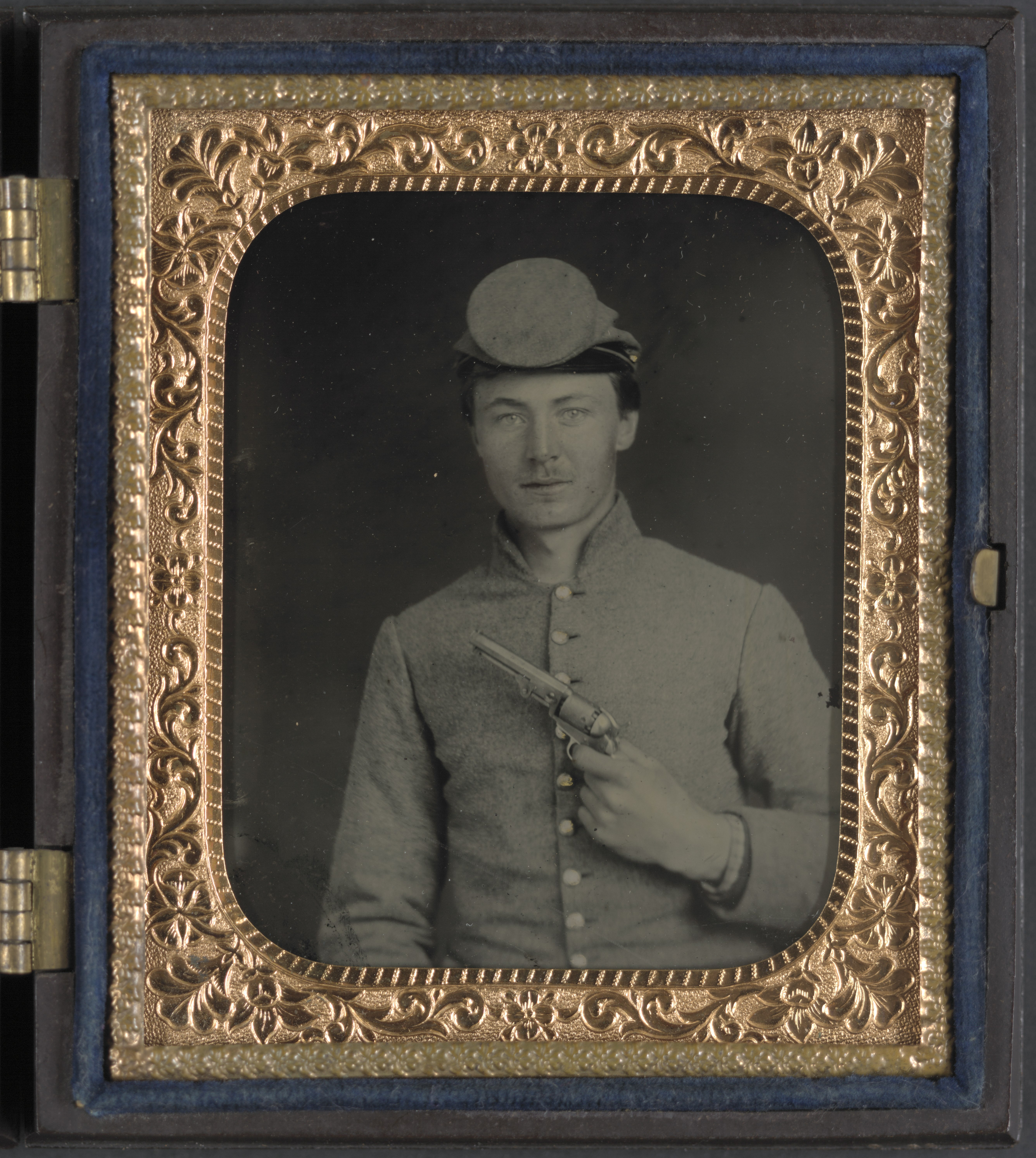
Private Peter Jones

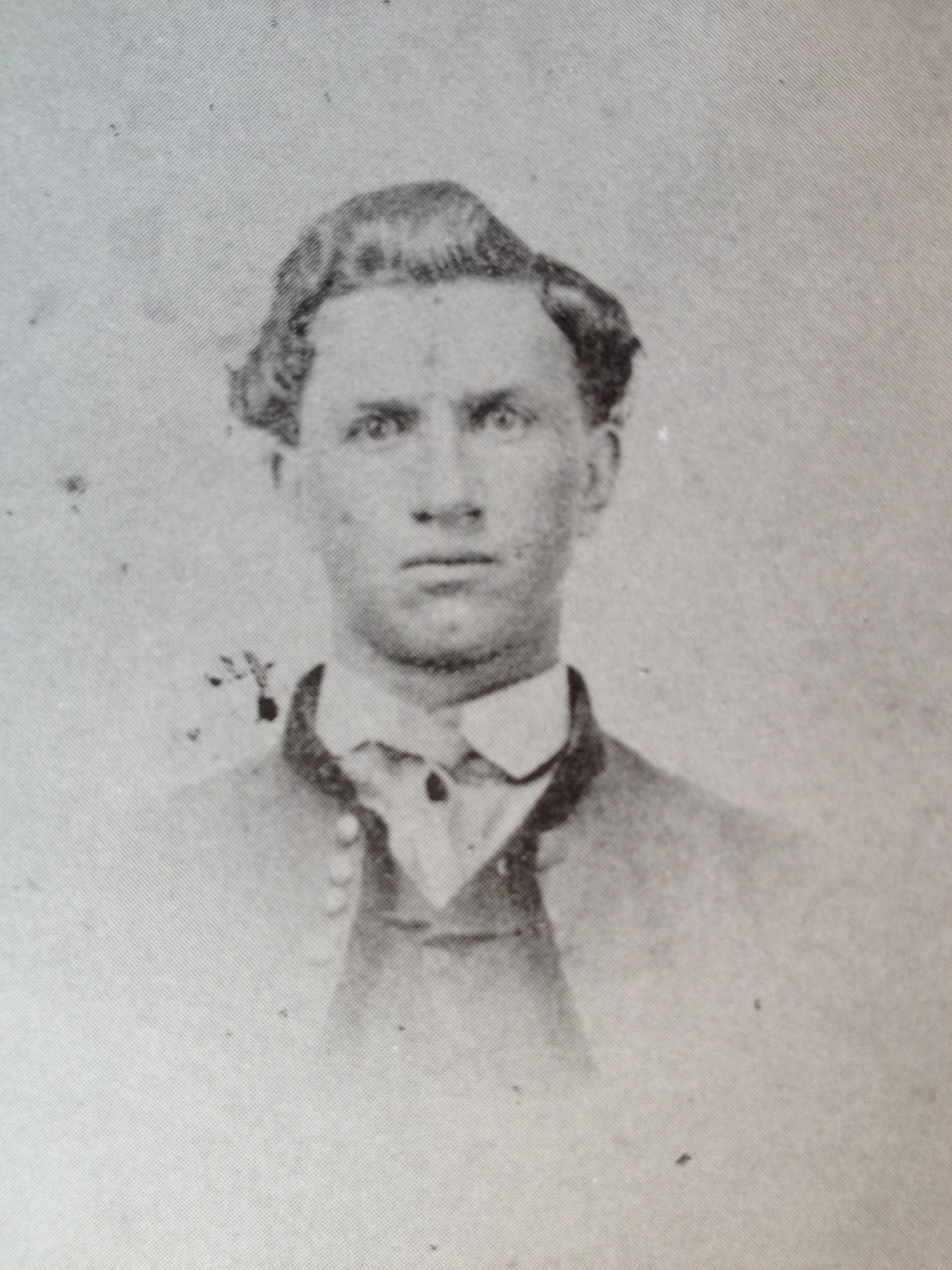
Pvt. John William Young, Petersburg Riflemen.

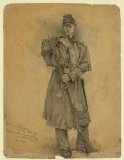
Sketch of an unknown member of the 12th Virginia

=== Military Actions ===
- 1861. The regiment consisted of nearly 1000 men and officers.
  - The 4th Battalion, (12th Virginia), goes into camp in Norfolk, after an extremely long delay by friends and family in Petersburg, from the early hours of the morning, until noon, the battalion was delayed. It is speculated by Mahone and the other commanders that if the unit had arrived as expected early on the morning of the 20th, that the whole of Norfolk Naval Base would have fallen intact to the Confederate Army.
  - Company K is assigned to the Seacoast Battery, on Craney Island, starting in May.
  - On August 22, Company H spent a month at the Battery of Bouch's Bluff.
- 1862.
  - May 7. The regiment took the ferry to Portsmouth, VA to march the 20 miles to Suffolk, following the actions of Union General Wool. The regiment threw away the knapsacks, blankets, excess gear, and two-soldier tents during the march.
  - On May 15, The 12th Virginia and Mahone's Brigade, were ordered to Drewry's Bluff, aiding the heavy artillery and the Confederate Marines stationed there.
  - May 19. U.S. Navy ships; ironclads, USS Galena and USS Monitor, with the Naugatuck and Port Royal, steam up the river from City Point, and engage the C.S. battery at Drewry's Bluff. The 12th Virginia left the fortifications and started to fire at the vessels, in the attempt to injure any exposed crewman. After several hours without affecting either side, the U.S. Navy retired back down the river.
  - May 28. The 12th Virginia, Mahone's Brigade, and the rest of Huger's Division, went into camp on the outskirts of Richmond.
- Battle of Seven Pines/Fair Oaks May 31, Mahone's Brigade found itself on a mis-marked road, being led away from battle in the afternoon assault.
  - June 1, 1 A.M., orders to Mahone moved his brigade to the Williamsburg Road, arriving west of Seven Pines by 7 A.M. After confusion on the field from Armistead's Brigade pulling out, Mahone misinterpreted orders and pulled his brigade out, leaving only General George Pickett's Brigade in combat. Pickett called for aid in holding the line, and General D. H. Hill sent Mahone's brigade back into combat. This placed them nearer to Casey's Redoubt, and lasted from noon to 1 P. M. With the closing of the day's battle, the 12th Virginia faced Francis Barlow's 6th New York Infantry, O. O. Howard's Brigade, Richardson's Division. The 12th Virginia was the last unit to withdraw during the night, as it was the closest to the enemy. The following morning, the men examined the Regimental Battle Flag, of the Petersburg City Guard, with its first bullet holes.
  - During this time, Confederate President Jefferson Davis signed an order placing Robert E. Lee as commander of the Confederate Army of Northern Virginia.
- June 25. Battle of Oak Grove 12th Virginia sustains 12 dead and 11 wounded, among highest in brigade.
- June 30 Battle of Glendale Huger's Division engaged in road construction per CSA General Mahone's orders; does not participate
- Battle of Malvern Hill 102 casualties, approximately 25% of 12 Virginia men engaged
- August 17, The regiment left the encampment at Falling Creek to board the Richmond and Petersburg Railroad train bound for Richmond, and marched from the R&P station to the Central Virginia Railroad station on Broad Street, in parade order with regimental band playing. The entire regiment carried either .58 caliber Springfield Rifle-muskets, or Enfield .577 caliber rifle-muskets, and possessed new rubber blankets, wool blankets, haversacks and other captured/issued goods. The men carried their personal effects in the bedroll, over the shoulder. The regiment left Richmond in boxcars from the Central Virginia Railroad, at 6 p.m.
- August 18, Train arrived at Louisa Court House around midnight, and the men had to march the thirteen miles to Gordonsville, and went into camp four miles south of Orange Court House.
- August 29–30. Second Battle of Manassas. 12th Virginia sustained 69 casualties, the highest of any regiment in Anderson's Division, including Major John P. May killed and Gen. Mahone and Col. D.A. Weisinger wounded; Col. William A. Parham of Sussex County and 41st Virginia Infantry led the brigade during Mahone's recovery
- September 4–20 Maryland Campaign
  - Battle of Crampton's Gap, 60 killed wounded or missing of 100 soldiers in the 12's Virginia, including Lt.Col. Fielding Taylor III killed
  - Battle of Antietam. Former Congressman and Petersburg lawyer Roger Pryor in brigade command (but commanding only 80 men, of which 23 men present for duty from 12th Virginia)
- December 13 Battle of Fredericksburg 12 Virginia sustains 8 killed or wounded by shell fire.

1863

- April 30-May 5 Battle of Chancellorsville. 12th Virginia sustains 36 killed or wounded; 51 taken prisoner at Germanna bridge near beginning; but on May 5 only 100 men present at roll call instead of 313, so Col. Feild on May 15 read public reprimand of unexcused absentees

May. Col. Weisinger returns to duty, having recovered from wounds of Second Manassas

- July 1–2.Battle of Gettysburg. 12th Virginia mostly in reserve; 1 killed, 8 wounded and 8 taken prisoners of war, one of the lowest casualty rates in army.

1864

- May 5–6.Battle of the Wilderness. Friendly fire incident between 12th Virginia and 41st Virginia wounds Gen. Longstreet and many others. Longstreet replaced by Richard Heron Anderson; Mahone replacing Anderson in divisional command and Col. Weisinger assumes command of Mahone's Brigade, and Lt.Col. E.M. Feild of 12th Virginia
- June 9–14. Battle of Old Men and Young Boys. Union troops attack Petersburg, defended by Lt.Col. Archer and about 125 local militia. Archer wounded on final day, when General Grant after arrival of Longstreet's Corps, changes to siege.
- June 18. 12th Virginia arrives during Siege of Petersburg. Would mostly man trenches for next 10 months
  - July 30Battle of the Crater. 12th Virginia loses 8 killed and 24 wounded, about 10% of those engaged
  - October 27–28Battle of Boydton Plank Road Though 12th Virginia protected South Side Railroad, many men became Union prisoners of war, including Captain Edward Scott of Company F, a grand nephew of Union General Winfield Scott

1865

- April 2. 12th Virginia in Mahone's Division acts as rear guard during Petersburg's evacuation
- Lee's surrender. After acting as rear guard during the evacuation of Petersburg on April 2–3, 1861, Mahone's Division was the largest in Lee's army. 12th Virginia surrendered 16 officers and 180 men.

== Officers and profiles of the 12th Virginia ==
=== Fletcher H. Archer ===
Fletcher Harris Archer was born on February 6, 1817, in Petersburg, one of the youngest of five sons and four daughters of Allen Archer, a prosperous miller, and Prudence Whitworth Archer. He attended school in Petersburg before entering the University of Virginia, where he received his bachelor of law degree on July 3, 1841. He then returned to his native city and established his practice.

On April 2, 1842, Archer was elected captain of the 7th Company, 39th Virginia Militia Regiment. He held that rank in December 1846, when he raised the Petersburg Mexican Volunteers, which became Company E of the 1st Virginia Volunteer Regiment. His was one of the few Virginia units that saw active military service during the Mexican War. The regiment reached Mexico early in 1847 and served on General Zachary Taylor's line until the end of the war. By August 1, 1848, the company was back in Petersburg, where Archer resumed his law practice. He married Eliza Ann Eppes Allen and they had one daughter, born shortly before her mother's death in April 1851.

Petersburg During the Civil War

Within two days of Virginia's secession from the Union, Archer raised a company of one hundred men that was designated Company K, "Archer Rifles," 12th Virginia Infantry Regiment. He was elected its captain. Shortly thereafter, on May 5, 1861, he was appointed lieutenant colonel in the 3rd Virginia Infantry Regiment. After brief intervals of service in command of the Naval Hospital in Norfolk, as lieutenant colonel of the 5th Battalion Virginia Infantry, and as commander of the 1st Brigade, Department of Norfolk, Archer retired in May 1862 to civilian life in Petersburg. On March 31, 1863, he married Martha Georgianna Morton Barksdale, a widow with three sons and one daughter.

As the armies moved ever closer to the Richmond-Petersburg front, Archer again offered his military expertise to the Confederacy. On May 4, 1864, he was commissioned a major commanding the 3rd, or "Archer's Battalion," Virginia Reserves. Composed of men between the ages of sixteen and eighteen and between forty-five and fifty-five from Petersburg and the counties of Dinwiddie and Prince George, the reserves were to be used for state defense and detail duty. They participated in Archer's greatest military accomplishment, his defense of Petersburg on June 9, 1864, in what has come to be called the Battle of Old Men and Young Boys.

As more than 1,300 Union cavalry troops led by Brigadier General August Kautz attempted to ride into Petersburg from the south and Union infantry threatened the defenses east of the city, 125 members of Archer's unit and 5 men and one gun from an artillery unit answered a call for reserves and militia to assemble at Battery 29 on the Jerusalem Plank Road. Later Archer recalled that details for special service and guard duty in Richmond had left him with barely a company of inadequately armed men in civilian clothes, combining those "with head silvered o'er with the frosts of advancing years" and others who "could scarcely boast of the down upon the cheek." His command repelled the first attack by the Northern troops but a second assault forced him back into the city. The arrival of Confederate cavalry and artillery put a check to further Union movement, but at the cost of 76 casualties to the reserves, more than half of those who had gone into action.

Promoted to lieutenant colonel, Archer led his unit in the defense of Petersburg during the subsequent Union attack of June 15–18 and throughout the nine-and-one-half-month siege of the city. Wounded in the arm at Petersburg, he was hit again during the retreat to Appomattox, where his combined force of the 3rd and 44th Battalions of Virginia Reserves surrendered sixty-five men.

After the war ended Archer returned to Petersburg and began to rebuild his law practice. Active in the local Conservative Party, he eventually became its chairman. He sought the party's nomination for mayor in 1876 and 1878 but lost both times to William E. Cameron, who had remained with the 12th Virginia until war's end and later aligned himself with General Mahone and even later with the Readjuster movement. In 1879 Archer and tobacconist Charles A. Jackson were the Conservative nominees for seats in the House of Delegates, but both lost as the Readjusters carried the city with 55 percent of the vote.

Following this citywide defeat, Archer won election to the Petersburg City Council and fellow councillors elected him their president. By virtue of this position Archer became mayor on January 2, 1882, when Cameron was sworn in as governor. At this point the council still had a Conservative majority, but Readjusters controlled all of the elective executive offices in Petersburg except the mayor's office and vowed to oust Archer in the May 1882 election.

To counter a Readjuster–Fusionist Republican coalition, the Conservatives formed an alliance with the Straightout Republicans and ran as the Citizens' Party. Archer received their nomination for mayor but lost to Thomas J. Jarratt, and the Readjusters won a narrow majority on the city council. The Conservatives then tried to keep the Readjusters from taking their seats by alleging a violation of the city charter, and on July 1 Archer refused to vacate his office at the end of his term. He did not finally step down as mayor until a lawsuit confirmed Jarratt in the office on March 23, 1883.

In 1884 Archer was a delegate to the state Democratic convention in Richmond and tried to encourage dissident white Readjusters to rejoin the Democratic Party. He did not run for another public office thereafter. Archer died at his home on High Street on August 21, 1902, after having been in "feeble health by reason of his advanced age for some months." He was interred in Petersburg's Blandford Cemetery.

=== Finlay F. Ferguson ===
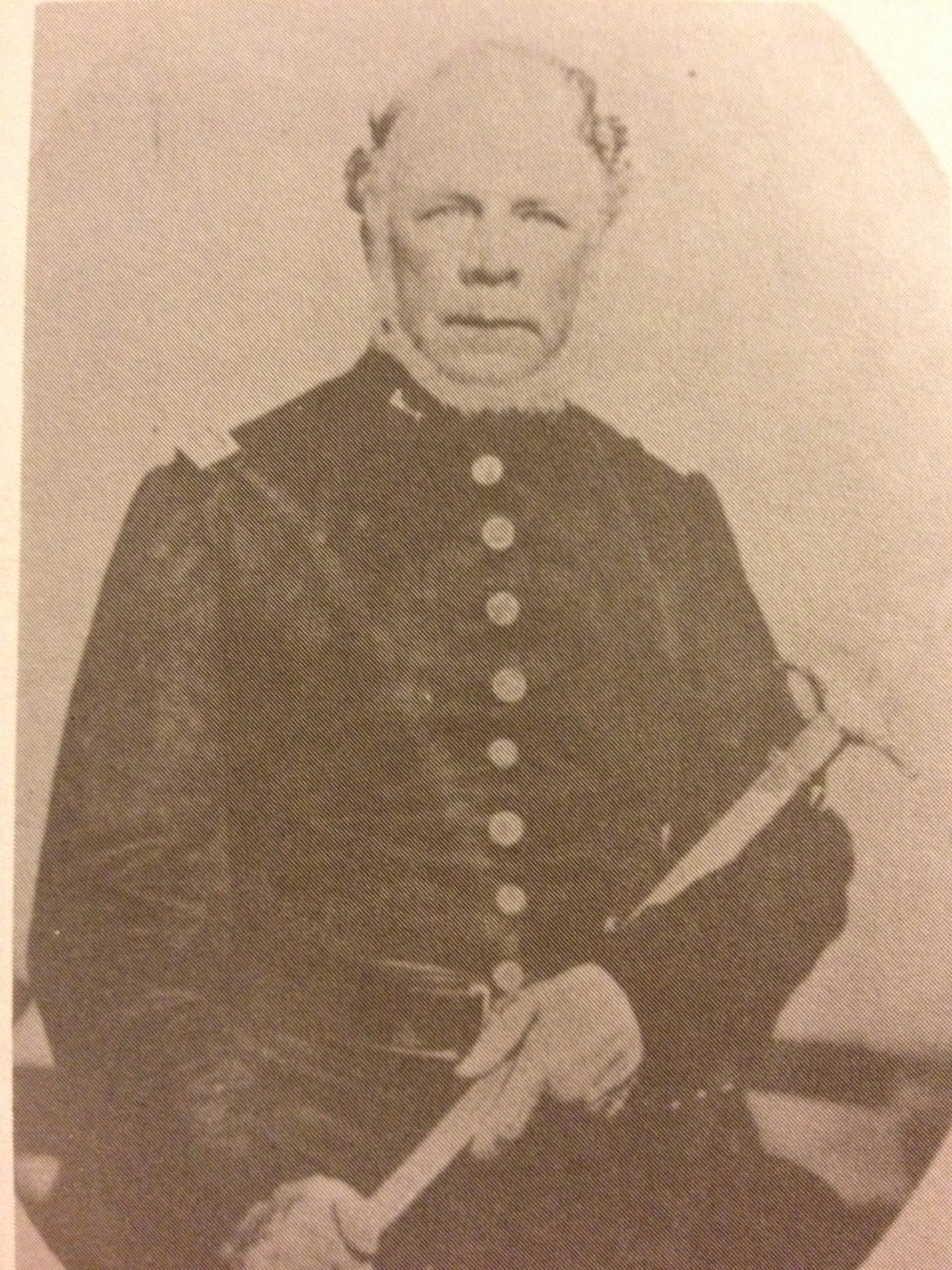

Captain of Company H, the Norfolk Junior Volunteers, from April 1861 to May 1862. Born in 1804, married in 1842, had 3 children in 1860. Mayor of Norfolk in 1860. (According to the Norfolk Public Library, he served from June 24, 1856, to 1858.) Died in 1863, and buried in Elmwood Cemetery, Norfolk, Virginia.

=== William Crawford Smith ===
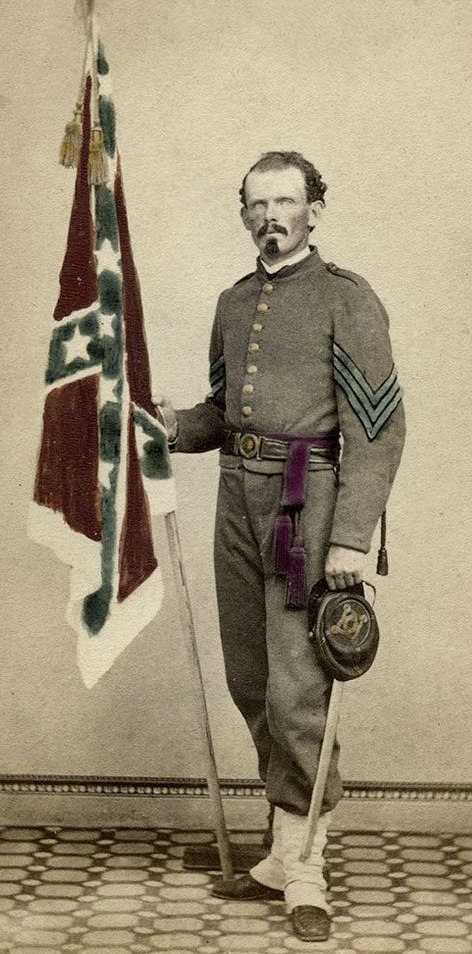
Sgt. William Crawford Smith, Flagbearer of the 12th Virginia Infantry, Co. C. photo taken circa 1863.

Enlisted on May 17, 1861, in Company B, the Petersburg Greys. Brother of Hugh Ritchie Smith and James Smith. Born in Petersburg on November 26, 1837. Moved to Nashville Tenn. before 1861, returned to enlist that year. Wounded at Crampton's Gap on September 14, 1862, captured and taken to the U.S. Army 6th Corps Hospital, in Burkittsville, Md. Date not recorded for parole/exchange to Confederacy. In Richmond Hospital, October to November, 1862. Promoted to Corporal on March 1, then Sergeant on August 1, 1863. Wounded during the Wilderness campaign, May 6, 1864, no recorded dates for hospital stay. Paroled at Appomattox after Lee's Surrender, he returned to Nashville, Tennessee, in 1865, becoming a building contractor and architect, built the early buildings at Vanderbilt University and the reproduction of the Parthenon in Nashville for the state centennial. Granted Colonelship of the 1st Tennessee Militia in 1896. Organized the 1896 Tennessee State Exposition. Became Colonel of the 1st Tennessee Infantry, U.S. Volunteers, from 1898 to 1899. Led his regiment in combat against Aguinaldo's Philippine insurrectionists in 1899. Fell dead from his horse, attributed to heat stroke, near Manila on February 5, 1899. He was known to be a Mason and a great reader. Buried at Mt. Olivet Cemetery, Nashville Tennessee, on April 19, 1899, following a huge state funeral, one of the largest ever seen in the city.

=== William Hodges Mann ===
William Hodges Mann was born in Williamsburg on July 31, 1843; as the son of John Mann and Mary Hunter Bowers. Went to Williamsburg Academy, and Brownsburg Academy in Rockbridge County. Became deputy clerk of the circuit court of Nottoway County, from 1859 to 1861. Enlisted on June 20, 1861, in Company E, the Petersburg Riflemen. Wounded at Seven Pines, on June 1, 1862. While recuperating, became temporary clerk to Confederate Treasury Dept. Served as a spy, behind Gen U.S. Grant's lines, during the Siege of Petersburg. After the war, in 1865, he was elected to clerk of the Virginia Circuit Court of Dinwiddie County. Admitted to the Bar in 1867. Married twice. Served as Judge of Nottoway County, from 1870 to 1892. Virginia State Senator from 1898 to 1910 and a Member of the Democratic State Executive Committee. Prominent Prohibitionist, and a promoter of public high schools. Established Bank of Crewe Va, was president to 1910. Owned a dairy farm in Burkeville. Was a Presbyterian elder, and friend to Rev. Theodorick Pryor, father of General Richard Pryor. Governor of Virginia from 1910 to 1914. Lawyer in Petersburg from 1914 to his death 1927. Died, on December 21, 1927, from a stroke at his law office desk. Buried in Blandford cemetery.

== The Legacy of the 12th Virginia ==
Veterans of the 12th Virginia gained political power in Petersburg during Reconstruction, and such continued as the Re-Adjuster Party took power. Former Sergeant of Company E, William E. Hinton, became a local financier and political leader, first as a Conservative, then as a Re-Adjuster, including a term in the Virginia General Assembly. His brother, Drury A. Hinton, former captain of Virginia's 41st Infantry, served as the city's prosecutor (elected and re-elected as Commonwealth Attorney), and won a seat on the Virginia Supreme Court.

The 12th Virginia Infantry lives on today in the form of an incorporated living history and reenactment unit bearing its designation. Modern Companies 'B' and 'C' live on in the Richmond-Petersburg region of the Commonwealth of Virginia; with one company not associated having formed in California as company 'G'. The Virginia unit is a family-friendly, non-profit organization, and participates in numerous events in Virginia and bordering states.

== See also ==
- List of Virginia Civil War units
