= Benjamin G. Barney =

American Civil War general (1827–1886)

Benjamin Griffin Barney
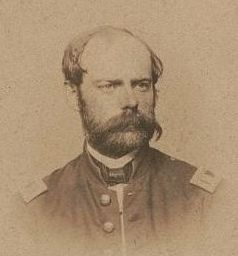
- Born: August 15, 1827; Nantucket, Massachusetts, U.S.
- Died: July 23, 1886 (aged 58); San Francisco, California, United States
- Burial place: San Francisco National Cemetery
- Military career
- Allegiance: United States (Union)
- Branch: United States Army (Union Army)
- Service years: 1862 – 1864
- Rank: Colonel; Bvt. Brigadier General
- Commands: 2nd Pennsylvania Provisional Heavy Artillery
- Conflicts: American Civil War; Siege of Petersburg; Second Battle of Petersburg; Battle of the Crater (WIA)

Benjamin Griffin Barney (1827-1886) was an American Brevet Brigadier General during the American Civil War. He was a commander of the 2nd Pennsylvania Provisional Heavy Artillery and was known for his service during the Second Battle of Petersburg.

== Biography ==
Despite being born in Massachusetts, Barney moved to Philadelphia as a merchant before the outbreak of the American Civil War. Barney enlisted in the 9th Pennsylvania Infantry Regiment on September 11, 1862, and was appointed as captain of Company B in the regiment. Around November 1862, Barney was commissioned to be a captain of Battery B of the 2nd Pennsylvania Heavy Artillery.

On April 20, 1864, Barney was promoted to Lieutenant Colonel and was transferred to the recently formed 2nd Pennsylvania Provisional Heavy Artillery to account for the amounts of extra soldiers that were left over from the 2nd Pennsylvania Heavy Artillery as well as into the Field of Staff of the 2nd Pennsylvania Pro. Heavy Artillery. During the Second Battle of Petersburg, Elisha Marshall got wounded during the fighting and Barney replaced him as the commander of 2nd Brigade, 1st Division, IX Corps. Afterwards, Barney and the 2nd Pennsylvania were assigned as the first line of Col. Marshall's lead at the Battle of the Crater however Barney got severely wounded during the fighting and was discharged on November 11, 1864, and hospitalized at Georgetown, D.C. Barney was brevetted Brigadier General on March 13, 1865, for his services during the Second Battle of Petersburg.

== See also ==
- List of American Civil War brevet generals (Union)
