= 61st Virginia Infantry Regiment =

61st Virginia Infantry Regiment 7th Battalion, Virginia Reserves
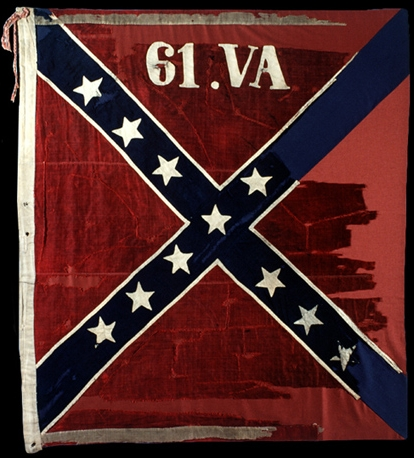
- 61st Virginia Volunteer Infantry Regiment Battle Flag
- Active: As 7th: Summer 1861 – October 1862; As 61st: October 1862 – April 1865
- Disbanded: April 1865
- Country: Confederacy
- Allegiance: Confederate States of America
- Branch: Confederate States Army
- Type: Artillery; Infantry
- Engagements: American Civil War: Battle of Antietam; Battle of Fredericksburg; Battle of Chancellorsville; Battle of Gettysburg; Overland Campaign; Siege of Petersburg; Appomattox Campaign

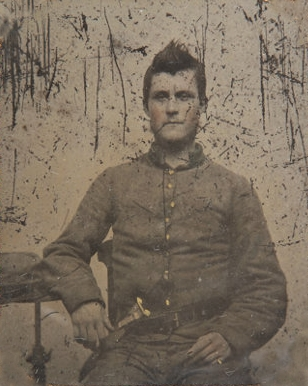
David W. Thornton, 61st Virginia Infantry

The 61st Virginia Infantry Regiment was an infantry regiment raised in Virginia for service in the Confederate States Army during the American Civil War. It fought mostly with the Army of Northern Virginia. The core of what would become the 61st Virginia was organized in Norfolk, Virginia in summer 1861 as the 7th Battalion, Virginia Reserves with eight companies. It served as heavy artillery in the Portsmouth and Norfolk area. However, when these cities were evacuated, the unit was transferred to the infantry and merged into the 61st Regiment being formed in Petersburg, Virginia in October 1862. Lieutenant Colonel Samuel M. Wilson was placed in command. The men of the 61st Virginia were from Portsmouth, and the counties of Norfolk, Isle of Wight, and Greensville. It was assigned to General Mahone's Brigade and which became General Weisiger's Brigade, Army of Northern Virginia upon General Mahone's promotion to Division Commander.

The 61st participated in many battles from Sharpsburg to Cold Harbor, endured the hardships of the Petersburg trenches south of the James River, and ended the war at Appomattox. It reported 1 wounded at Fredericksburg, had 4 killed and 28 wounded at Chancellorsville, and lost about eight percent of the 356 at Gettysburg.

The regiment surrendered 10 officers and 107 men. Its field officers were Colonels Virginius D. Groner and Samuel M. Wilson, Lieutenant Colonels William F. Niemeyer and William H. Stewart, and Major Charles R. McAlpine.

Company F was known as the "Isle of Wight Avengers."

The battle flag of the regiment is currently displayed in the visitor center at Appomattox Court House.

== See also ==
- List of Virginia Civil War units
