= 6th Virginia Infantry Regiment =

Confederate States Army unit

- Flag of Virginia, 1861
- Active: May 1861 – Spring 1865
- Disbanded: April 1865
- Country: Confederacy
- Allegiance: Confederate States of America
- Type: Confederate States Army
- Role: Infantry
- Engagements: American Civil War: Battle of Malvern Hill; Second Battle of Bull Run; Battle of Chancellorsville; Battle of Gettysburg

Commanders
- Notable commanders: Colonel William Mahone

The 6th Virginia Infantry Regiment was an infantry regiment raised in Virginia for service in the Confederate States Army during the American Civil War. It fought mostly with the Army of Northern Virginia.

6th Infantry Regiment organized at Norfolk, Virginia in May, 1861, composed of men recruited from Norfolk and nearby Princess Anne, Nansemond, and Chesterfield Counties.

The field officers were Colonels Thomas J. Corprew (Norfolk's sheriff in 1861 and captain of the Norfolk Light Artillery Blues), William Mahone (who rose to General and later U.S. Senator), and George T. Rogers; Lieutenant Colonels William T. Lundy and Henry W. Williamson; and Major Robert B. Taylor. Corprew's brother Oliver H.P. Corprew, a wealthy tobacco farmer from Mecklenburg County became the unit's quartermaster.

== History ==
The 6th Virginia initially protected Norfolk, but after the city fell to Union forces in June, 1862, was placed in Mahone's Brigade with 673 effectives. Upon Mahone's promotion, General D.A. Weisiger, who began the war as a captain of the 12th Virginia Infantry assumed command of the brigade that included both regiments.

The 6th participated in the campaigns of the Army of Northern Virginia from the Seven Days' Battles to Cold Harbor, then saw action in the Petersburg trenches and around Appomattox.

It reported 10 killed, 33 wounded, and 8 missing at Malvern Hill, had 12 killed and 49 wounded at Second Manassas, and had 5 killed and 34 wounded at Fredericksburg. The regiment sustained 47 casualties at Chancellorsville and lost three percent of the 288 engaged at Gettysburg. It surrendered 110 officers and men on April 9, 1865.

== See also ==
- List of Virginia Civil War units
