= Otelia B. Mahone =

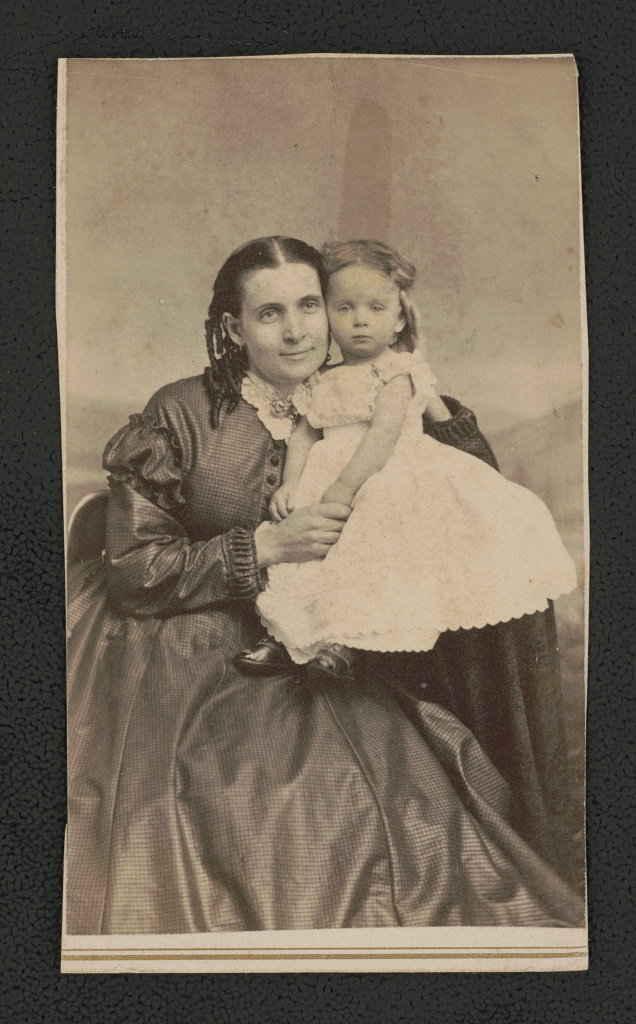
Otelia Mahone with a child, likely her daughter Otelia

Otelia Butler Mahone (August 1, 1835 – February 11, 1911) from Smithfield, Virginia was a nurse during the American Civil War and the wife of Confederate Major General William Mahone, who was a civil engineer, teacher, railroad builder, and Senator in the United States Congress. Popularly known in Virginia as the "Hero of the Battle of the Crater" during and after the Civil War, her small-of-stature husband was nicknamed "Little Billy." An illustrious "character" in her own right, strong-willed Otelia Butler Mahone became almost as well known as her famous husband. She is credited by local legend with the naming of the towns of Windsor, Ivor, Wakefield, Waverly and Disputanta along the famous 52-mile tangent railroad tracks (now part of Norfolk Southern) engineered and built by her husband between the cities of Suffolk and Petersburg. When he led the formation of the Atlantic, Mississippi and Ohio Railroad (AM&O) from three trunk lines across the southern tier of Virginia in 1870, wags claimed the initials stood for "All Mine and Otelia's."

In their later years, Otelia and Little Billy Mahone settled in her mother's original hometown of Petersburg, Virginia, where she lived as a widow for many years after his death in 1895.

== Parents and childhood ==
Otelia Butler was the daughter of Dr. Robert Butler (1784–1853) of the town of Smithfield in Isle of Wight County, Virginia and his second wife, the former Otelia Voinard (1803–1855), originally from Petersburg, Virginia. The Butler family was prominent, and Dr. Butler was serving as the elected Treasurer of the Commonwealth of Virginia when he died in 1853.

She has been described in published accounts as a "lady of rare beauty with a strong, forceful personality." It was also said that young Otelia Butler came from "cultured" background.

== Marriage ==
William Mahone was of Irish-American heritage and grew up in Southampton County, Virginia. He graduated with the Class of 1847 from Virginia Military Institute (VMI), trained as a civil engineer. He was hired in 1853 to build the Norfolk and Petersburg Railroad (N&P), which passed through Isle of Wight County not far from the Butler's home in Smithfield.

Otelia married 29-year-old Mahone on February 8, 1855. The couple settled in Norfolk, Virginia. Later in 1855, they escaped the yellow fever epidemic which decimated a third of the population of the Norfolk-Portsmouth area by staying with his mother in Jerusalem (later renamed Courtland) in Southampton County.

Popular legend has it that Otelia and William Mahone traveled along the newly completed Norfolk and Petersburg Railroad naming stations from Ivanhoe, a book she was reading written by Sir Walter Scott. From his historical Scottish novels, Otelia chose the place names of Windsor, Waverly and Wakefield. She tapped the Scottish Clan "McIvor" for the name of Ivor, a small Southampton County town. When they reached a point in Prince George County not far from the end of the line at Petersburg, the two could not agree. It is said that they invented a new word in honor of their "dispute", which is how the tiny community of Disputanta was named. The N&P railroad was completed in 1858, and William was named its president.

When her husband became an officer in the Confederate Army, Otelia served the cause in Richmond as a nurse. Small of stature at 5 feet 5 inches tall and weighing only 100 pounds (45 kg), her husband was nicknamed "Little Billy". When Otelia was notified by Governor John Letcher that her husband had been injured in the Second Battle of Manassas, but had only received a "flesh wound", she replied "Now I know it is serious for William has no flesh whatsoever." Late in the War, during the Siege of Petersburg, Otelia and the children moved to Petersburg to be near him. Mahone himself became the hero of the Battle of the Crater in July, 1864, and was promoted to Major General.

== Children and family life ==
Otelia and William Mahone had 13 children. However, only 3 of their children survived to adulthood, two sons, William and Robert, and a daughter, also named Otelia.

William Mahone, Jr. (1856-1927) attended school at Hanover Academy. He was engaged in the tobacco trade for a time and later served as collector of customs at Petersburg.

Robert Butler Mahone (1858-1914) was assigned to his father as private secretary for a number of years and afterward was in the government service. In 1898, he was appointed by U.S. President William McKinley as Consul of the United States at Nuevo Laredo, Tamaulipas, across the U.S.-Mexico border from Laredo, Texas.

Otelia (née Mahone) McGill traveled extensively in Europe and in 1895 married William L. McGill, from a prominent Petersburg, Virginia family.

The Mahones lived in Norfolk after their marriage. Late in the Civil War, they relocated to Petersburg. They moved to Lynchburg, headquarters of the new Atlantic, Mississippi and Ohio Railroad (AM&O) for several years from 1869 to 1872, returning to Petersburg, where they lived the rest of their lives. Their former home on South Sycamore Street in Petersburg became part of the Petersburg Public Library. In 1874, they acquired and enlarged a house on South Market Street which was their home thereafter.

== Postwar ==
In a meeting near Appomattox Court House about the time of the surrender, defeated Confederate General Robert E. Lee urged his generals to go home and start rebuilding. In the post-war period, William Mahone redirected his attention back to his pre-war occupation, railroading, quickly rebuilding the Norfolk and Petersburg Railroad. He became president of the South Side Railroad in late 1865, and was instrumental in combining the N&P and South Side Railroad with the Virginia and Tennessee Railroad to form the Atlantic, Mississippi and Ohio Railroad in 1870. Otelia and William moved to Lynchburg, Virginia, headquarters of the A, M & O, whose initials were said to stand for "All Mine and Otelia's". After the Financial Panic of 1873, the A, M & O fell behind on its bonds, and went into receivership. Mahone lost control in 1881 to northern financial interests who renamed it the Norfolk and Western Railway.

William Mahone was also active in Virginia politics for almost 30 years. He was elected to the Virginia General Assembly in 1864 while still serving in the Confederate Army. After he failed in a bid to become governor in 1877, he organized Readjuster Party the following year. His chosen candidate William E. Cameron was elected as governor, serving from 1882 to 1886. Mahone himself served in the United States Congress as one of Virginia's two senators from 1881 to 1887.

== Heritage ==
William Mahone died in 1895 in Washington, D.C. Otelia lived for 15 more years, and died in Petersburg, Virginia on February 11, 1911, at the age of 75 years and 6 months. They are buried in Blandford Cemetery in Petersburg.

A large portion of U.S. Highway 460 between Petersburg and Suffolk parallels the 52-mile tangent line of the railroad William engineered. As the road passes through the towns he and Otelia are thought to have named, it is locally-known as General Mahone Boulevard and General Mahone Highway.
