= John R. McDaniel =

Member of the Virginia House of Delegates from the Campbell County district
- In office December 5, 1877 – May 1878 Serving with W. E. Burnham, A.S. Grigsby
- Succeeded by: H. Howard Withers

Personal details
- Born: July 9, 1807 Amherst, Virginia, US
- Died: May 14, 1878 (aged 70) Washington, D.C., US
- Spouse: Eliza Foster Chaplin
- Children: Oriana Robin McDaniel
- Occupation: Businessman, politician, Freemason

John Robin McDaniel (July 9, 1807 – May 14, 1878) was a businessman and leading citizen of Lynchburg, Virginia, who represented it for one term in the Virginia General Assembly.

== Early and family life ==
McDaniel was born to McDaniel and Dolly Waller Robinson in Amherst, Virginia on July 9, 1807. The large family (he was the youngest of six boys and a girl who survived to adulthood, two other daughters dying as infants) moved to nearby Lynchburg, where his mother died when he was nine. He received a private education.

McDaniel married Elizabeth Foster Chaplin on August 16, 1837, and they had a daughter, Oriana Robin McDaniel. It may have been his second marriage, for John Robin McDaniel Irby would later graduate from the University of Virginia and publish scientific papers.

== Career ==
His firm, McDaniel and Irby, were grocers and commission merchants. One of Lynchburg's leading boosters, McDaniel helped found the Lynchburg Gaslight Company, and pledged his fortune to build the Virginia and Tennessee Railroad, whose President he became.

McDaniel owned dozens of slaves. He was once involved in litigation concerning a slave owned in trust whom he was supposed to hire out, but sold. However, J. R. McDaniel was not one of Lynchburg's major slave traders like William Norvell, Chiswell Dabney, George Whitlocke, William Radford and John H. Tyree in the city's early years, and later consolidators (sending slaves to the Deep South) George Davis, M. Hart, E. Myers and Seth Woodroof.

McDaniel was a 33rd degree Scottish Rite Freemason who served as the Grand Master of Masons in Virginia from 1860 to 1861. McDaniel served on the Supreme Council beginning in 1847 and succeeded Lynchburg's James Penn as Lieutenant Grand Commander in 1870, serving until his death during a Masonic convention in 1878.

In 1860, as the American Civil War began, McDaniel retired from his railroad position in favor of civil engineer Robert L. Owen Sr., who had helped survey the route and had been operating the railroad. During the Civil War, McDaniel received a contract to supply salt to Confederate forces from Saltville, Virginia, which the railroad transported. After the war, former Confederate General (and future Republican U.S. Senator, 1881–87) William Mahone, who headed the Norfolk and Petersburg Railroad acquired most of the V&T stock (Lynchburg becoming a majority black city after the war and holding many shares), and merged it and the South Side Railroad into the new Atlantic, Mississippi and Ohio Railroad, which soon went bankrupt.

McDaniel remained active in many community activities. In 1877, he ran for the part-time position of delegate to the Virginia General Assembly representing Lynchburg, after controversial election results the previous year were thrown out by Judge James Garland after the ballots were stolen. McDaniel won the election and served in the session of December 5, 1877 – March 14, 1878.

== Death and legacy ==
McDaniel died of a heart attack, aged 72, in Washington, D.C. while attending a Masonic convocation, on May 14, 1878.
