= Walter Gwynn =

American politician

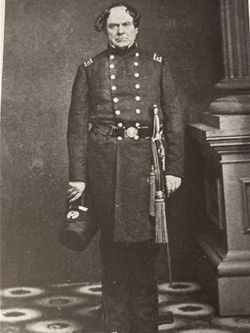
- Born: February 22, 1802; Jefferson County, Virginia (now West Virginia), US
- Died: February 6, 1882 (aged 79); Baltimore, Maryland, US
- Burial place: Hollywood Cemetery, Richmond, Virginia
- Military career
- Allegiance: United States, Confederate States of America
- Branch: US Army, Confederate States Army
- Service years: 1822–32 (USA); 1861–63 (CSA)
- Rank: First Lieutenant (USA); Brigadier General (CSA)
- Conflicts: American Civil War
- Other work: Florida Comptroller, Civil engineer

Walter Gwynn (February 22, 1802 – February 6, 1882) was an American civil engineer and soldier who became a Virginia Provisional Army general and North Carolina militia brigadier general in the early days of the American Civil War in 1861 and subsequently a Confederate States Army colonel. He was a railroad engineer and railroad president before the Civil War, Florida Comptroller in 1863 and a civil engineer after the Civil War.

== Early life ==
Gwynn was born in Jefferson County, Virginia (now West Virginia), the grandson of Humphrey Gwynn, a descendant of Colonel Hugh Gwynn, who settled in Virginia before 1640. Walter Gwynn was the son of Thomas Peyton Gwynn, born April 19, 1762, and Ann. Thomas Peyton Gwynn died in 1810, the same year his daughter, Frances Ann Gwynn, married William Branch Giles, Senator and later Governor of Virginia. William B. Giles and Frances were Walter Gwynn's guardians in 1818 when he entered West Point, according to the records.

== United States Military ==
He graduated from the United States Military Academy at West Point, New York, in the Class of 1822 and was commissioned a brevet second lieutenant in the 2nd U.S. Artillery, later transferring to the 4th U.S. Artillery. In 1827, while still an artillery lieutenant, he helped survey the route for the Baltimore and Ohio Railroad (B&O).

== Civil Engineer ==
He resigned his army commission in February 1832. From 1833 to 1836, he worked as chief engineer in charge of the construction of the Portsmouth and Roanoke Railroad. He was Superintendent and Chief Engineer of the Wilmington and Raleigh Railroad in North Carolina from 1836 to 1840; also during this period, he conducted surveys for several other railroad and canal projects in Florida, North Carolina, and Virginia. From 1842 to 1846 he was president of the Portsmouth and Roanoke Railroad, and in 1846, he became president of the James River and Kanawha Canal Company, a position which he held until 1853, when he moved from Richmond, Virginia, to Raleigh, North Carolina. In 1850, Gwynn was hired by the North Carolina Rail Road Company as Chief Engineer "Employed on the Surveys and Location of the North Carolina Rail Road, from the commencement of operations to the completion of the location." Gwynn supervised construction of the North Carolina Railroad until it was completed in early 1856. Between 1853 and 1855, he conducted surveys for the Atlantic & North Carolina Railroad and the Western North Carolina Railroad; and from 1848 to 1855 he was the chief engineer of the Wilmington & Manchester Railroad. He was also chief engineer of the Blue Ridge Rail Road Company in South Carolina in the 1850s.

Gwynn's concurrent positions with multiple railroads was considered controversial and was criticized at times, but his qualifications and accomplishments overshadowed such criticism. But by the late 1850s, he had established an international reputation as a railroad engineer and as a founder of the southeastern railroad network. A colleague said that Gwynn "made for himself a reputation among his fellow engineers that will last for all time." In 1857, he retired from railroad work and moved to South Carolina.

== Confederate States Military ==
At the start of the Civil War, Gwynn was a major in the engineers of the South Carolina Militia. At the request of the governor, he had accepted the commission and was instrumental in the planning of the attack on Fort Sumter in early 1861 as a member of the Ordnance Board. He was later charged with constructing batteries at various strategic points in Charleston Harbor, facing Fort Sumter.

On April 10, 1861, he accepted a commission as major general of the Virginia Militia and was directed by Virginia governor John Letcher to assume command of the defenses around Norfolk and Portsmouth until mid-May. Working with Gwynn at Norfolk was William Mahone, who was the president of the Norfolk and Petersburg Railroad. Working under Gwynn's authority, Mahone (who was still a civilian) helped bluff the Federal troops into abandoning the Gosport Shipyard in Portsmouth by running a single passenger train into Norfolk with great noise and whistle-blowing, then much more quietly, sending it back west, and then returning the same train again, creating the illusion of large numbers of arriving troops to the Federals listening in Portsmouth across the Elizabeth River (and just barely out of sight). The ruse worked, and not a single Confederate soldier was lost as the Union authorities abandoned the area, and retreated to Fort Monroe across Hampton Roads.

In 1861, Gwynn oversaw construction of defensive fortifications at Sewell's Point, which was across the mouth of Hampton Roads from Fort Monroe at Old Point Comfort. He also participated in the Battle of Big Bethel during the Blockade of the Chesapeake Bay.

Gwynn also served as a brigadier general in the Virginia Provisional Army and then brigadier general in the North Carolina Militia, commanding the Northern Coast Defenses of North Carolina. All of these general-officer assignments were in the spring and summer of 1861.

By August he joined the Confederate States Army as a major of engineers and was promoted to colonel on October 9, 1862. (Fellow railroader Mahone also joined the Confederate Army, eventually achieving the rank of major general after becoming the so-called 'Hero of the Battle of the Crater,' which took place near Petersburg in 1864.)

== Later life ==
In 1863, he resigned his commission and was named Florida Comptroller. After the war, Gwynn returned to civil engineering in North Carolina. He died in 1882 at the Carrolton Hotel in Baltimore, Maryland, and is buried in Hollywood Cemetery in Richmond, Virginia.
