= Norfolk and Petersburg Railroad =

Overview
- Headquarters: Petersburg, Virginia
- Locale: Virginia
- Founder: Francis Mallory
- Dates of operation: 1858–1870
- Successor: Atlantic, Mississippi and Ohio Railroad

Technical
- Track gauge: 5 ft (1,524 mm) gauge
Route map
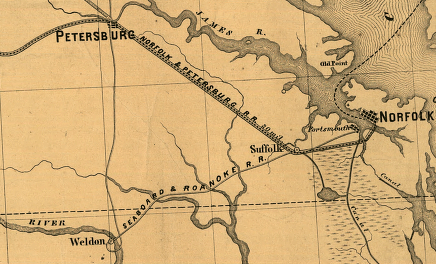
Norfolk and Petersburg Railroad map, c. 1858-1870, issued by William Mahone, President

The Norfolk and Petersburg Railroad was built between Norfolk and Petersburg, Virginia and was completed by 1858. The line was 85 miles (137 km) of 5 ft (1,524 mm) track gauge.

It played a role on the American Civil War (1861–1865), and became part of the Atlantic, Mississippi and Ohio Railroad (AM&O) in 1870. The AM&O became the Norfolk and Western (N&W) in 1881. About 100 years later, the Norfolk and Western was combined with the Southern Railway, another profitable carrier, to form the Norfolk Southern Railway in 1982.

In the 21st century, almost all of the original well-engineered N&P, including the corduroy roadbed through the Great Dismal Swamp and 52-mile tangent alignment is still in service. It forms part of a major coal export route terminating at Lambert's Point near Hampton Roads. In addition to coal, most of the route is in active use in the 20th century for intermodal container and automobile parts and completed vehicle shipments.

== A railroad for Norfolk ==
Although railroads emerged as a new transport technology in the 1830s, and a line of the Portsmouth and Roanoke Railroad reached nearby Portsmouth in 1835, Norfolk was to wait 20 more years for a railroad line. In 1851, the authority to build the line was finally obtained followed many years of lobbying by Norfolk area politicians who were attempting to overcome opposition in the Virginia General Assembly. The representatives of inland port cities such as Richmond and Petersburg correctly foresaw that building the new railroad would lessen their role in export shipping trade. Dr. Francis Mallory (1807–1860) a former Representative in the United States Congress and later a member of the Virginia General Assembly was named the railroad's first president.

== William Mahone: Engineering and building the N & P ==
In 1853, the new Norfolk and Petersburg Railroad hired as its chief engineer 26-year-old William Mahone (1826–1895), of Southampton County, and construction began. A civil engineer and graduate of Virginia Military Institute, he designed and built drawbridges across the busy Eastern and Southern Branches of the Elizabeth River near Norfolk. Mahone, who had gained previous experience building plank roads, is credited with the design and implementation of an innovative roadbed through the Great Dismal Swamp near Norfolk, Virginia, employing a corduroy log foundation laid at right angles beneath the surface of the swamp. Still in use today, Mahone's design withstands immense tonnages of coal traffic through the swamp. He is also responsible for engineering and building the famous 52 mile-long tangent track between Suffolk and Petersburg which is also part of a major artery of modern Norfolk Southern rail traffic.

In 1855, Mahone married Otelia Butler (1837–1911). She was the daughter of the late Dr. Robert Butler from Smithfield, Virginia, who had been Treasurer of the State of Virginia. Otelia, who was said to have been a "cultured" lady, and William Mahone settled in Norfolk. A yellow fever epidemic swept through Norfolk in 1855 and within several months, killed 2,000 people, nearly a third of the population. However, the Mahones went to stay with his mother in Courtland, about 40 miles away, until the epidemic passed. Construction of the new railroad was delayed for more than a year due to the many deaths and resulting financial hardships to those financing the project. Ever frugal, Mahone was widely credited with staying within a very tight budget while maintaining his high engineering standards, earning considerable public esteem along the line.

== Naming stations ==
Otelia Mahone became a well-known character of sorts in her own right. Popular legend has it that Otelia and William Mahone traveled along the newly completed railroad naming stations from Ivanhoe, a book she was reading by Sir Walter Scott. From Scott's historical Scottish novels, she chose the place names of Windsor, Waverly and Wakefield. She tapped the Scottish Clan "McIvor" for the name of Ivor, a small Southampton County town.

No one seems to know how Zuni, a station located between several of the others, was named. However, when they reached a location in Prince George County not far from the end of the line in Petersburg, apparently the couple could not agree. It is said that they invented a name based upon their "dispute", and that is how Disputanta was named. In 1858, the railroad was completed and William Mahone was named its president in 1860.

== American Civil War ==
By the time the Norfolk and Petersburg Railroad was completed, the clouds of conflict which would become the American Civil War were already forming. In 1861, the railroad had 85.5 miles of track, 13 stations, 6 wood-burning steam locomotives, and 98 freight and passenger cars. Mahone was envisioning joining his 2 neighboring railroads to the west to create a through-line across the entire southern tier of Virginia to Bristol, Tennessee. However, the War interrupted that work.

After Virginia voted to secede from the United States on April 17, 1861, local officials began to establish control of federal property at Norfolk. However, the valuable shipyard was guarded by Union troops. While still a civilian, Mahone helped bluff the federal troops to abandon the Gosport Shipyard in Portsmouth by running a single passenger train into Norfolk with great noise and whistle-blowing, then much more quietly sending it back west, and then returning the same train again (again with much noise, etc.) creating the illusion in Portsmouth across the Elizabeth River just out of sight of large numbers of arriving Confederate troops. Combined with carefully placed misinformation to those manning the shipyard, the ruse worked, and not a single Confederate soldier died as the Union authorities quickly set fire to the yard and ships and abandoned the area, retreating to Fort Monroe across Hampton Roads.

Initially serving under General Walter Gwynn who commanded Norfolk's defenses, William Mahone soon became an officer in the Confederate Army. Early in the War, the N&P was useful to the Confederacy and transported ordnance to the Norfolk area where it was used during the Confederate occupation. Once the Union took control of Norfolk in the spring of 1862, most of his railroad was in Union hands and Mahone became a full-time military operant, leading troops in many campaigns in and around Virginia. Meanwhile, Otelia worked as a Confederate nurse in Richmond. Brigadier General Mahone had a noteworthy role in the Battle of the Crater during the Siege of Petersburg in 1864, and was with Confederate General Robert E. Lee at his surrender at Appomattox Court House in April 1865.

== Atlantic, Mississippi, and Ohio Railroad ==
After the war, Mahone led the rebuilding of the N&P, and soon became involved in the South Side Railroad, which ran from Petersburg to Lynchburg, becoming its president as well. Reviving his prewar dream, he became the driving force in the linkage of N&P, South Side Railroad and the Virginia and Tennessee Railroad to form the Atlantic, Mississippi & Ohio Railroad (AM&O), a new line extending from Norfolk to Bristol, Virginia which was formed in 1870 after several years of lobbying of the Virginia General Assembly by Mahone and his political allies. William and Otelia Mahone moved to Lynchburg, where headquarters were established. The letters AM&O were said to stand for "All Mine and Otelia's."

The AM&O operated successfully for several years, but fell behind in bond payments during the financial panic of 1873. The bondholders worked well with Mahone until 1876, when they had other receivers appointed. After several years of operating under receiverships, Mahone's role as a railroad builder ended in 1881 when northern interests purchased the AM&O and renamed it Norfolk and Western.

Mahone was able to arrange for the proceeds of the sale of the AM&O (including the former N&P) to help found 2 schools for teachers. The Virginia Normal and Collegiate Institute near Petersburg was forerunner of Virginia State College, which expanded to become Virginia State University. The other school he helped fund became Norfolk State College, which expanded to become Norfolk State University in Norfolk, Virginia.

The former South Side Railroad was originally one of three AM&O divisions, and was later consolidated with the former N&P into a single division. The AM&O did well for several years, but fell on hard times in the financial panic of 1873 which negatively impacted almost all of the railroads. After several years of operating under receiverships, Mahone's role as a railroad builder ended in 1881 when northern interests purchased the AM&O and renamed it Norfolk and Western. Mahone was able to arrange for a portion of the State's proceeds of the sale to help found a school to prepare teachers to help educate black children and former slaves. The Virginia Normal and Collegiate Institute near Petersburg was forerunner of Virginia State College, which expanded to become Virginia State University.

== Norfolk and Western, Norfolk Southern ==
The Norfolk and Western itself grew into a great system, and the former Norfolk and Petersburg Railroad formed a major piece of the line used to transport bituminous coal from the mines in southwestern Virginia and southern West Virginia to port at Norfolk, where a huge coal pier was built at Lambert's Point. The N&W merged with the smaller but also highly efficient Virginian Railway in 1959, facilitating a more favorable route for eastbound coal than offered by the former South Side Railroad west of Burkeville. However, from that point east, the combination brought an increase to the South Side Railroad alignment as former VGN traffic was rerouted through Crewe to connect with the former N & P on its way to Lambert's Point. Norfolk & Western Railway was combined with the Southern Railway, another profitable carrier, to form Norfolk Southern Railway (NS) in 1982.

Over 150 years after completion, much of the former Norfolk and Petersburg Railroad route is still in active use and is a vital portion of Norfolk Southern Railway, a Class I railroad which for many years had its headquarters in Norfolk, only a short distance from the coal piers at Lambert's Point.

On December 11, 2012, Amtrak began "Northeast Regional" passenger service to the Hampton Roads area over this trackage, with a connection to the mainline built near the Collier yard south of Petersburg. The Amtrak station is next to Harbor Park, just north of the Eastern Branch of the Elizabeth River.
