= John McDaniel =

John McDaniel may refer to:

- John McDaniel (American football)
- John McDaniel (musician)
- John R. McDaniel, businessman and politician in Virginia
