= Robert B. Mahone =

American diplomat (1858–1914)

Robert Butler Mahone (18 October 1858 – August 18, 1914), better known as Butler Mahone, was appointed Consul of the United States at Nuevo Laredo, Tamaulipas, across the U.S.-Mexico border from Laredo, Texas on January 22, 1898, by U.S. President William McKinley (1843–1901).

He was the son of Otelia Butler Mahone and former Confederate General and United States Senator William Mahone. As one of the family's three children to survive infancy, he had an older brother, William T. Mahone Jr. (1856–1927) and a younger sister, Otelia (née Mahone) McGill.

Butler Mahone's maternal grandfather, Dr. Robert Butler of Smithfield in Isle of Wight County, was the treasurer of the state of Virginia when he died in 1853.

Butler Mahone had been assigned to his father as private secretary for a number of years and afterward was in the government service. He is buried in Blandford Cemetery in Petersburg, Virginia.
