= Brown's Ferry (Drakes Corner, Virginia) =

Historic house in Virginia, United States

- U.S. National Register of Historic Places
- Virginia Landmarks Register
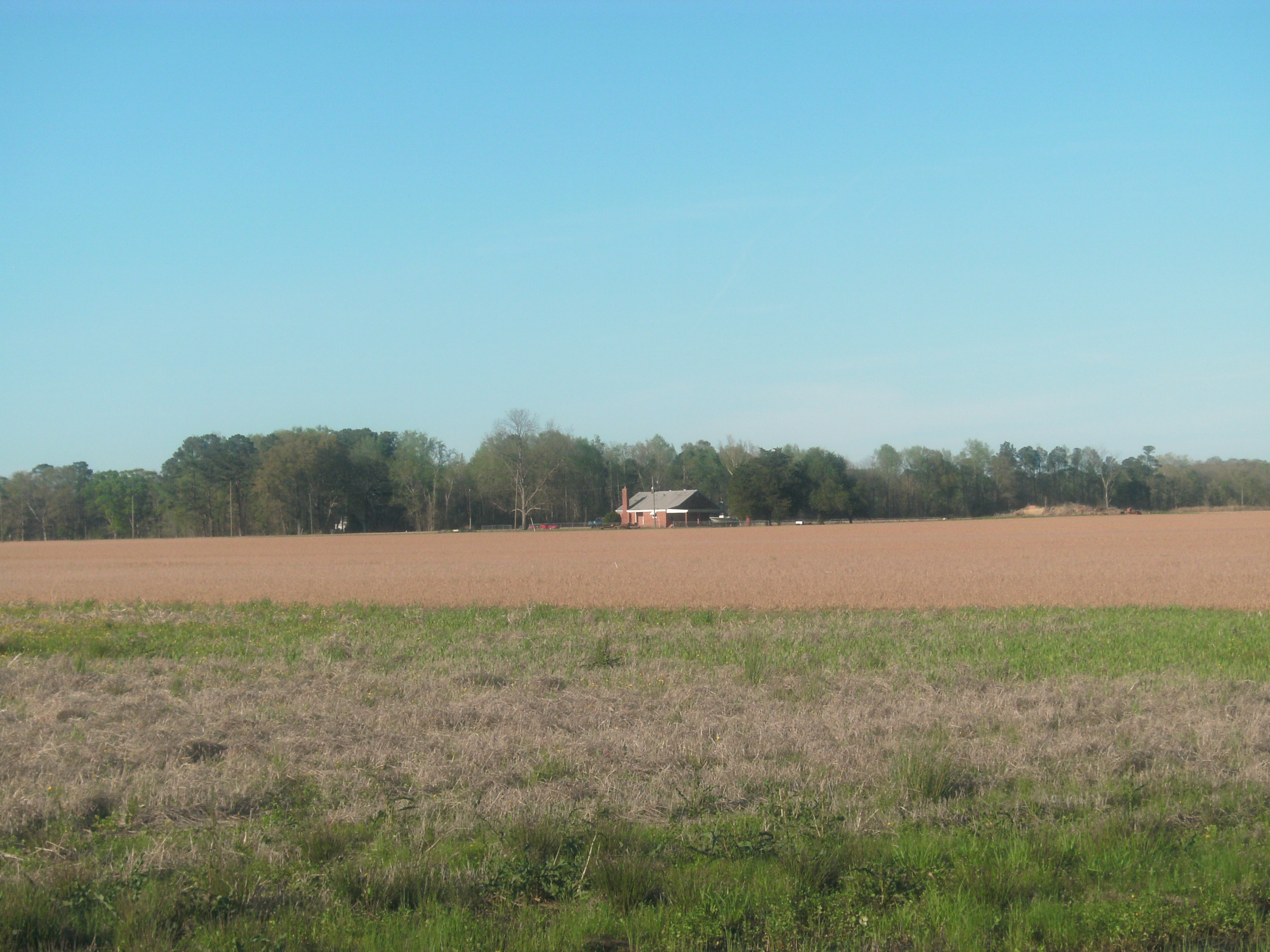
- Brown's Ferry in April 2017. The house appears to have been demolished.

- Location within Virginia Location within the United States
- Location: East of Drakes Corner off VA 684, near Drakes Corner, Virginia
- Coordinates: 36°36′37″N 77°0′4″W
- Area: 7 acres (2.8 ha)
- Built: c. 1815
- Architectural style: Federal
- NRHP reference No.: 79003090
- VLR No.: 087-0120

Significant dates
- Added to NRHP: June 18, 1979
- Designated VLR: March 20, 1979

Brown's Ferry, also known as the Mahone House, is a historic home near Courtland, Southampton County, Virginia. It was built about 1815, and is a large two-story, five-bay, Federal style brick dwelling. It has a one-story kitchen attached to the rear. The main house has a side gable roof and three interior end chimneys. The interior features notable woodwork and painting. Also on the property are a contributing smokehouse, corn crib, and pole barn. It was the birthplace of Confederate General William Mahone (1826–1895).

It was listed on the National Register of Historic Places in 1979.
