= Virginia and Tennessee Railroad =

The Virginia and Tennessee Railroad was an historic 5 ft (1,524 mm) gauge railroad in the Southern United States, much of which is incorporated into the modern Norfolk Southern Railway. It played a strategic role in supplying the Confederacy during the American Civil War.

== Founding and early history ==
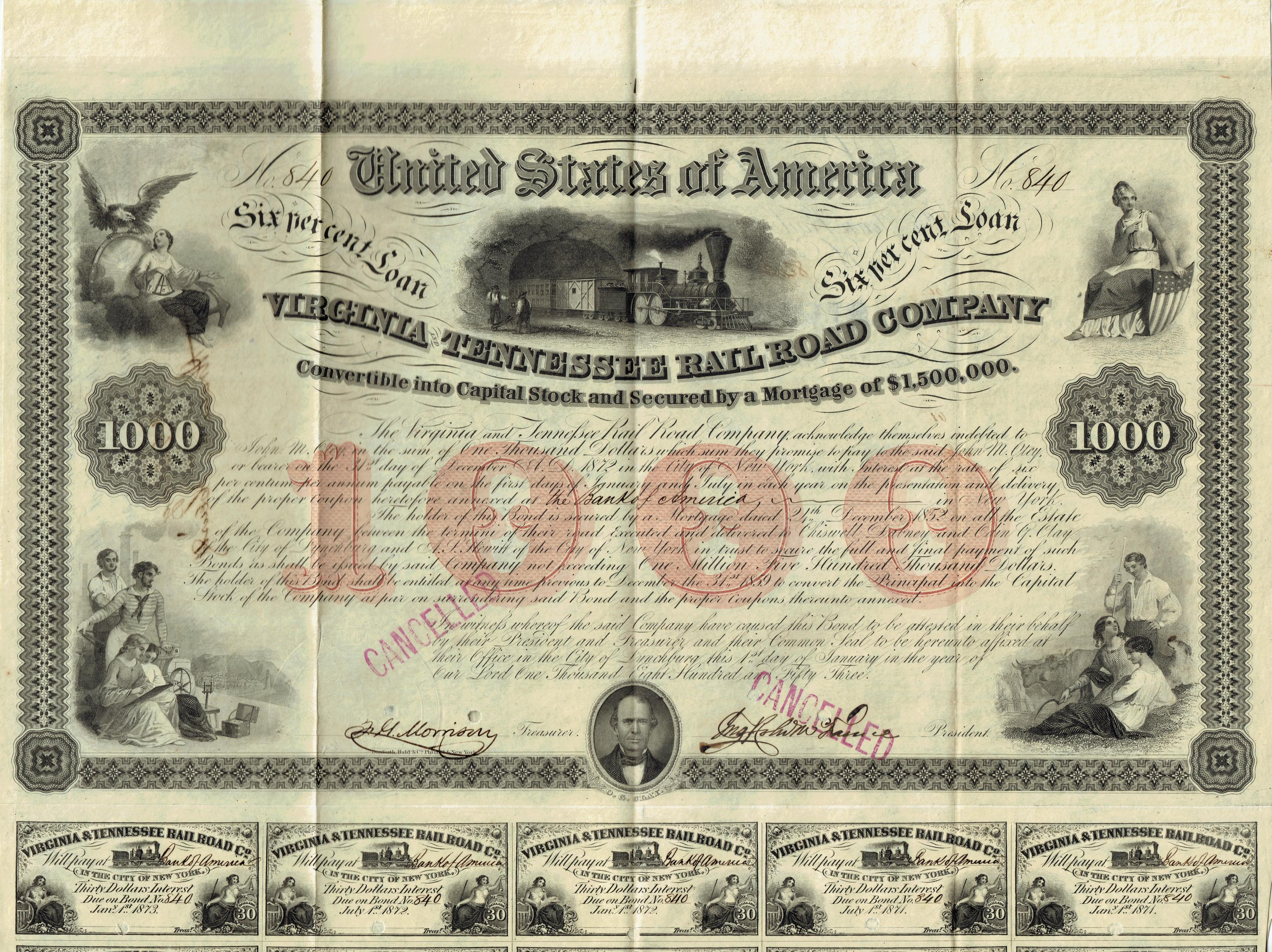
Bond of the Virginia and Tennessee Rail Road Company, issued 1 January 1853

Built in the 1850s, the V&T ran completely through southwestern Virginia along a portion of the Great Valley of Virginia. The railroad extended westward from Lynchburg, through a gap in the Blue Ridge Mountains near the town of Big Lick (the present-day city of Roanoke); there, it turned southwestward and followed the Great Valley to Bristol, a total distance of 204 miles (328 km).

After the Virginia government refused to fund its construction (in part because it could adversely affect the James River Canal), the city of Lynchburg incorporated the railroad on March 24, 1848, as the Lynchburg and Tennessee Railroad. John R. McDaniel, who had previously put together the Lynchburg Gas Light Company and who had pledged his fortune to get it built, was its first president. Construction of the road bed began in 1850, and on February 18, 1852, the railroad's first locomotive (the "Virginia") was tested when it steamed out of Lynchburg's James River basin, climbing the nearby low mountains. Regular freight service was initiated not long afterwards. Construction of the railroad's entire length to Bristol was completed on October 1, 1856.

The Virginia and Tennessee stimulated rapid economic growth in the counties through which it ran, and also changed their political alignment to more closely resemble that in Richmond and the Tidewater area, rather than of other Virginia counties in the Appalachian mountain region (much less those in the Ohio River watershed where slavery was much less common and that became West Virginia during the Civil War). Bristol, formerly a small town on the Tennessee border, became a communication and commercial hub. During the 1850-1860 decade, southwest Virginia's population increased, and the proportion of those living in slavery increased 15%. Thus, while northwestern Virginia elected almost all firm opponents of secession to the Virginia Secession Convention of 1861, the Abingdon Democrat editorialized for secession, only to be disappointed at the number of "wait-a-bit" delegates elected from surrounding counties.

=== American civil war ===
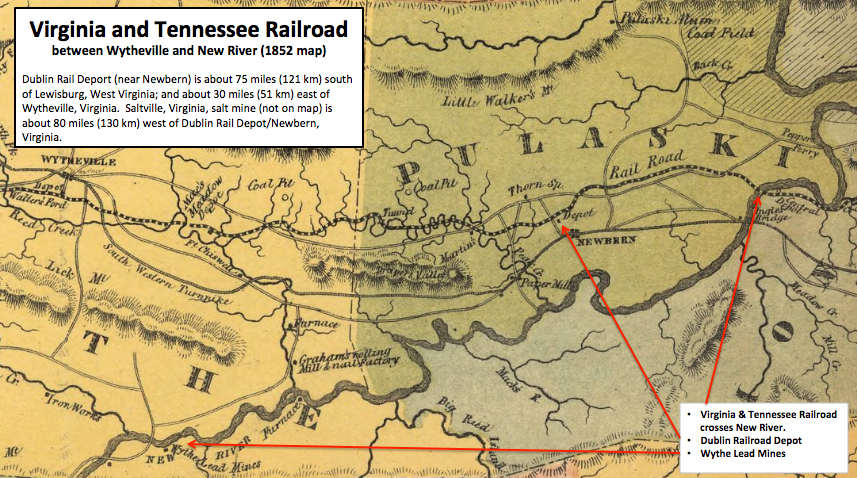
V&T RR near Dublin Depot

During the Civil War, Robert L. Owen Sr., who had been one of the engineers surveying for the railroad and who had risen through the ranks, succeeded McDaniel as president. The railroad became a key supply, food and troop movement route for the Confederate States Army, particularly from the capital of Richmond to the interior at Chattanooga, Tennessee. A Confederate Army regional headquarters was located at the railroad's Dublin Depot in Virginia.

The railroad moved key raw materials: copper from mines near Cleveland, Tennessee, salt from Saltville, Virginia, and saltpeter from caves throughout the region. A large lead mine was located in Wythe County, Virginia, south of Wytheville in Austinville. Almost all of the domestically–produced lead used by the Confederacy for bullets came from this mine, and it produced at least one third of the lead used by the Confederate Army. Union forces finally captured much of the railroad and destroyed tracks and rolling stock in late 1864, although service was periodically interrupted by a series of cavalry raids earlier in the war.

== The Mahone years ==
After the war, the road was rebuilt and came under the control of former Confederate general William Mahone, who was already leading the Southside Railroad and the Norfolk and Petersburg Railroad. He was named president of the V&T by the end of 1867. Mahone desired to consolidate the three roads and build further west, and he worked for several years lobbying to get the needed legislation through the Virginia General Assembly.

In 1870, it became part of Mahone's Atlantic, Mississippi and Ohio Railroad. The letters A, M & O were said to stand for "All Mine and Otelia's." The Mahones lived in Lynchburg during this time, but moved to Petersburg in or before 1880.

The A, M & O was initially profitable, but fell victim to the Financial Panic of 1873, like many other southern railroads. Mahone was initially able to placate the English and Scottish bondholders, but the relationship soured in 1875. After several years of operating under receiverships, Mahone's role as a railroad builder ended in 1881 when Northern interests purchased the A, M, & O and renamed it Norfolk and Western.

Mahone was able to arrange for a portion of the state's proceeds of the sale to help found a school to prepare teachers to help educate black children and former slaves. The Virginia Normal and Collegiate Institute near Petersburg was forerunner of Virginia State College, which expanded to become Virginia State University.

== 20th Century and modern ==
Norfolk & Western Railway (N&W) was expanded west into the coalfields and eventually into a much larger system. One hundred years later, the N&W was combined with the Southern Railway, another profitable carrier, to form Norfolk Southern Corporation (NS) in 1982.

Today, much of the former Virginia and Tennessee Railroad remains in service for Norfolk Southern (NS). The Fortune 500 company, headquartered in Norfolk, transports bituminous coal, intermodal freight transport/shipping containers, automobile parts and completed vehicles, and other commodities in the 21st century global transportation markets.

== Notes ==
=== References ===
- Whisonant, Richard C. (May 1996). "Geology and the Civil War in Southwestern Virginia: The Wythe County Lead Mines" (PDF). Virginia Minerals. 42 (2). Charlottesville, Virginia: Commonwealth of Virginia, Department of Mines, Minerals, and Energy: 13–19. Archived from the original on August 8, 2017.
- Whisonant, Richard C. (November 1997). "Geology and the Civil War in Southwestern Virginia: Union Raiders in the New River Valley, May 1864" (PDF). Virginia Minerals. 43 (4). Charlottesville, Virginia: Commonwealth of Virginia, Department of Mines, Minerals, and Energy: 29–39. Archived from the original on November 16, 2021.
- Whisonant, Robert C. (2015). Arming the Confederacy: How Virginia's Minerals Forged the Rebel War Machine. Cham, Switzerland: Springer International Publishing. ISBN 978-3-319-14508-2. OCLC 903929889.
