= Robert Butler (Virginia politician) =

American physician (1784–1853)

Robert N. Butler (August 1784 – July 31, 1853) was an American politician and medical doctor. He served as Adjutant General of Virginia in the War of 1812, and was State Treasurer of Virginia from 1846 to 1853.

== Biography ==
Butler was born in August 1784, in Surry County, Virginia, where his family had lived since the mid-17th century. Several of his ancestors had been members of the House of Burgesses.

Butler studied at the College of William and Mary. He eventually obtained a M.D. degree and practiced medicine in Smithfield, Virginia.

Butler married twice. His first wife was Eliza Bracken, whose father, Reverend John Bracken, was rector of Bruton Parish Church, president of the College of William and Mary, and had served as a mayor of Williamsburg. Their son, John Bracken Butler, also became a physician.

His second wife was Otelia Voinard of Petersburg, Virginia. Their daughter, Otelia Voinard Butler, married William Mahone, a railroad executive, Confederate general, United States Senator, and leading figure in the Readjuster Party.

Butler died on July 31, 1853, aged 68. He and his second wife are buried in the cemetery at St. Luke's Church, Isle of Wight County, Virginia, near Smithfield.
