= Battle of the Crater =

Military action of the American Civil War

- Part of the American Civil War
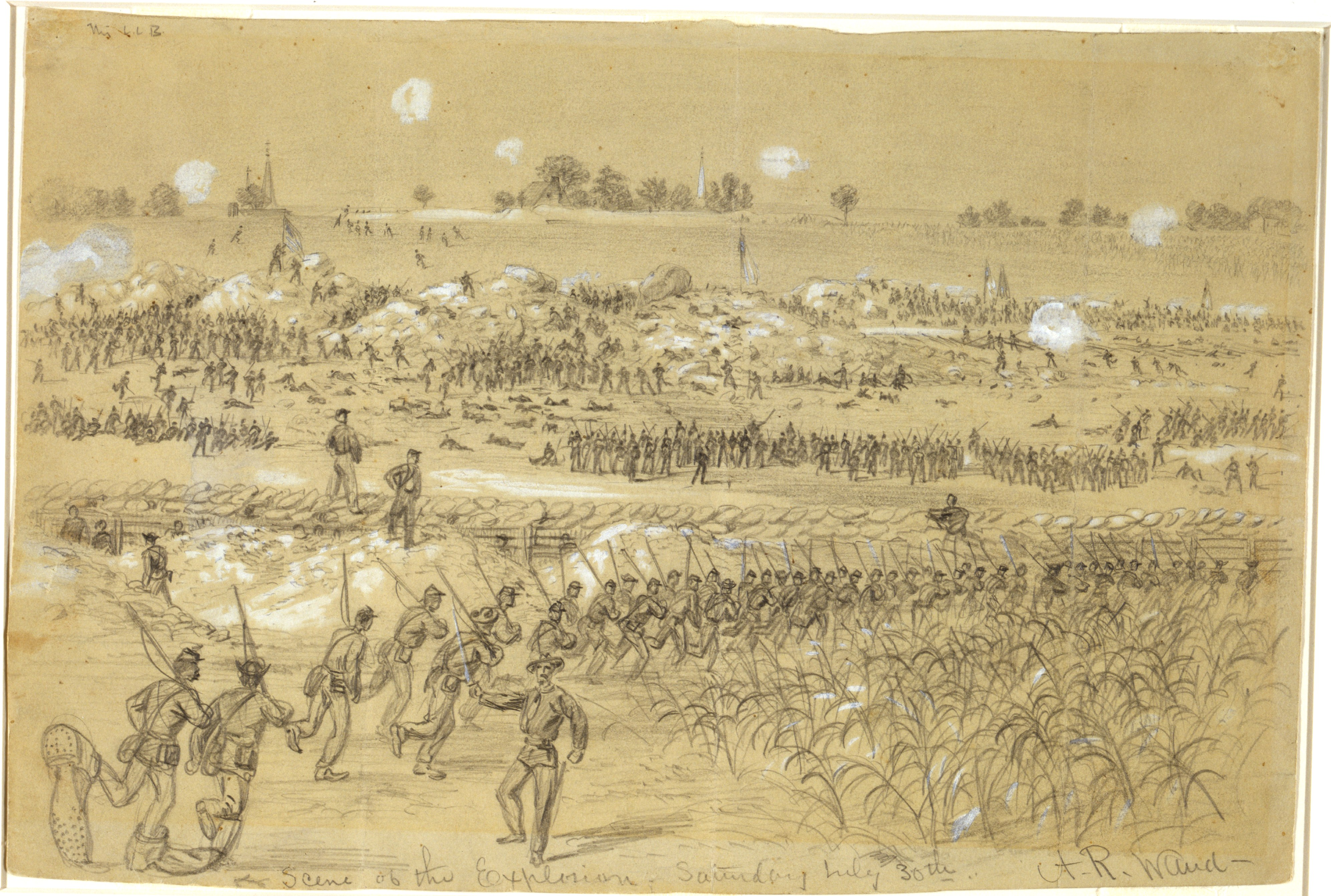
- Scene of the explosion July 30th 1864; Alfred R. Waud, artist
Date	July 30, 1864
Location	Petersburg, Virginia 37°13′06″N 77°22′40″W
Result	Confederate victory

Belligerents
United States (Union)	Confederate States (Confederacy)

Commanders and leaders
(United States) Ambrose E. Burnside (United States) James H. Ledlie	Robert E. Lee; P. G. T. Beauregard; William Mahone

Units involved
IX Corps	Elements of the Army of Northern Virginia 64th Regiment, Georgia Infantry

Strength
8,500	6,100

Casualties and losses
3,798 total 504 killed 1,881 wounded 1,413 missing or captured	1,491; 361 killed 727 wounded 403 missing or captured
- Location within Virginia

The Battle of the Crater took place during the American Civil War, part of the Siege of Petersburg. It occurred on Saturday, July 30, 1864, between the Confederate Army of Northern Virginia, commanded by General Robert E. Lee, and the Union Army of the Potomac, commanded by Major General George G. Meade under the direct supervision of the general-in-chief, Lieutenant General Ulysses S. Grant.

After weeks of preparation, on July 30 Union forces exploded a mine across from Union Major General Ambrose E. Burnside's IX Corps sector, blowing a gap in the Confederate defenses of Petersburg, Virginia. Instead of being a decisive advantage to the Union, this precipitated a rapid deterioration in the Union position. Unit after unit charged into and around the crater, where most of the soldiers milled in confusion in the bottom of the crater. Grant considered this failed assault as "the saddest affair I have witnessed in this war."

The Confederates quickly recovered, and launched several counterattacks led by Brigadier General William Mahone. The breach was sealed off, and the Union forces were repulsed with severe casualties, while Brigadier General Edward Ferrero's division of black soldiers was badly mauled. It may have been Grant's best chance to end the siege of Petersburg; instead, the soldiers settled in for another eight months of trench warfare.

Burnside was relieved of command for his role in the fiasco, and he was never returned to command. Ferrero and General James H. Ledlie were observed behind the lines in a bunker, drinking liquor throughout the battle. Ledlie was criticized by a court of inquiry into his conduct that September, and in December he was effectively dismissed from the Army by Meade on orders from Grant, formally resigning his commission on January 23, 1865.

== Background ==
During the Civil War, Petersburg, Virginia, was an important railhead, where four railroad lines from the south met before they continued to Richmond, Virginia, the capital of the Confederacy. Most supplies to General Lee's army and Richmond funneled through that location. Consequently, the Union regarded it as the "back door" to Richmond and as necessary for its defense. The result was the siege of Petersburg. It was actually trench warfare, rather than a true siege, as the armies were aligned along a series of fortified positions and trenches more than 20 miles (32 km) long, extending from the old Cold Harbor battlefield near Richmond to areas south of Petersburg.

After Lee stopped Grant's attempt to seize Petersburg on June 15, the battle settled into a stalemate. Grant had learned a hard lesson at Cold Harbor about attacking Lee in a fortified position and was chafing at the inactivity to which Lee's trenches and forts had confined him. Finally, Lt. Col. Henry Pleasants, commanding the 48th Pennsylvania Infantry of Major General Ambrose E. Burnside's IX Corps, offered a novel proposal to break the impasse.

Pleasants, a mining engineer from Pennsylvania in civilian life, proposed digging a long mine shaft under the Confederate Army lines and planting explosive charges directly underneath a fort (Elliott's Salient) in the middle of the Confederate First Corps line. If successful, not only would all the defenders in the area be killed, but also a hole in the Confederate defenses would be opened. If enough Union troops filled the breach quickly enough and drove into the Confederate rear area, the Confederates would not be able to muster enough force to drive them out, and Petersburg might fall. Burnside, whose reputation had suffered from his 1862 defeat at the Battle of Fredericksburg and his poor performance earlier that year at the Battle of Spotsylvania Court House, agreed to Pleasants's plan.

=== Mine construction ===
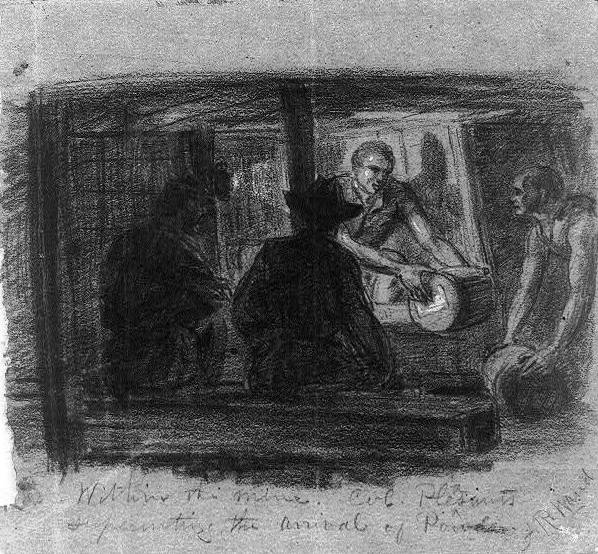
Contemporary sketch of Col. Pleasants supervising the placement of powder in the mine

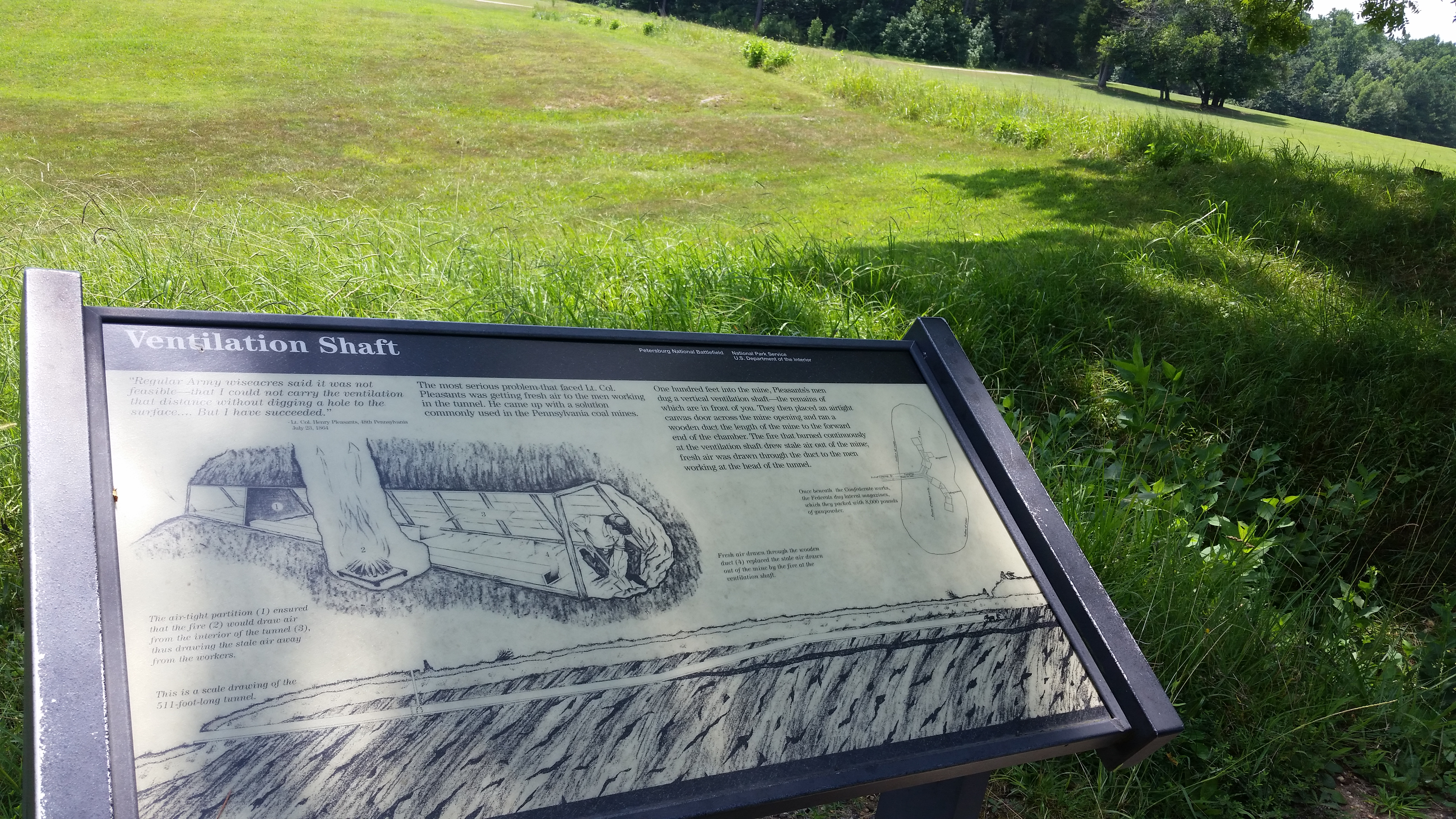
National Park Service marker depicting details of the mine

Digging began in late June, but even Grant and Meade saw the operation as a "mere way to keep the men occupied" and doubted it of any actual tactical value. They quickly lost interest, and Pleasants soon found himself with few materials for his project, and his men even had to forage for wood to support the structure.

Work progressed steadily, however. Earth was removed by hand and packed into improvised sledges made from cracker boxes fitted with handles, and the floor, wall, and ceiling of the mine were shored up with timbers from an abandoned wood mill and even from tearing down an old bridge.

The shaft was elevated as it moved toward the Confederate lines to make sure moisture did not clog up the mine, and fresh air was drawn in by an ingenious air-exchange mechanism near the entrance. A canvas partition isolated the miners' air supply from outside air and allowed miners to enter and exit the work area easily. The miners had constructed a vertical exhaust shaft located well behind Union lines. At the vertical shaft's base, a fire was kept continuously burning. A wooden duct ran the entire length of the tunnel and protruded into the outside air. The fire heated stale air inside of the tunnel, drawing it up the exhaust shaft and out of the mine by the chimney effect. The resulting vacuum then sucked fresh air in from the mine entrance via the wooden duct, which carried it down the length of the tunnel to the place in which the miners were working. That avoided the need for additional ventilation shafts, which could have been observed by the enemy, and it also easily disguised the diggers' progress.

On July 17, the main shaft reached under the Confederate position. Rumors of a mine construction soon reached the Confederates, but Lee refused to believe or act upon them for two weeks before he commenced countermining attempts, which were sluggish and uncoordinated, and were unable to discover the mine. However, General John Pegram, whose batteries would be above the explosion, took the threat seriously enough to build a new line of trenches and artillery points behind his position as a precaution. Shafts were also sunk by the Confederates in an effort to intercept the passage. Pleasants became aware of the Confederate's counter-movements and was able to frustrate their effort by changing the direction of the main and lateral galleries while increasing their depth below the surface.

The mine was in a "T"-shape. The approach shaft was 511 feet (156 m) long, starting in a sunken area downhill and more than 50 feet (15 m) below the Confederate battery, making detection difficult. The tunnel entrance was narrow, about 3 feet (1 m) wide and 4.5 feet (1.4 m) high. At its end, a perpendicular gallery of 75 feet (23 m) extended in both directions. Grant and Meade suddenly decided to use the mine three days after it was completed after a failed attack known later as the First Battle of Deep Bottom. Union soldiers filled the mine with 320 kegs of gunpowder, totaling 8,000 pounds (3,600 kg). The explosives were approximately 20 feet (6 m) under the Confederate works, and the T-gap was packed shut with 11 feet (3 m) of earth in the side galleries. A further 32 feet (10 m) of packed earth was placed in the main gallery to prevent the explosion blasting out the mouth of the mine. On July 28, the powder charges were armed.

=== Preparation ===
Burnside had trained a division of United States Colored Troops (USCT) under Brigadier General Edward Ferrero to lead the assault. The division consisted of two brigades, one designated to go to the left of the crater and the other to the right. A regiment from both brigades was to leave the attack column and extend the breach by rushing perpendicular to the crater, and the remaining regiments were to rush through, seizing the Jerusalem Plank Road just 1,600 feet (490 m) beyond, followed by the churchyard and, if possible, Petersburg itself. Burnside's two other divisions, made up of white troops, would then move in, supporting Ferrero's flanks and race for Petersburg itself. Two miles (3 km) behind the front lines, out of sight of the Confederates, the men of the USCT division were trained for two weeks on the plan.

Despite the careful planning and intensive training, on the day before the attack, Meade, who lacked confidence in the operation, ordered Burnside not to use the black troops in the lead assault. He claimed that if the attack failed, black soldiers would be killed needlessly, creating political repercussions in the North. Meade may have also ordered the change of plans because he lacked confidence in the black soldiers' abilities in combat and feared that if they were butchered, Radical Republicans would make an issue out of it and claim they were deliberately allowed to be killed. Burnside protested to Grant, who sided with Meade. When volunteers were not forthcoming, Burnside selected a replacement white division by having three commanders, Brigadier General Robert Brown Potter, Brigadier General Orlando B. Wilcox and Brigadier General James H. Ledlie draw lots. Ledlie's 1st Division was selected, but he failed to brief the men on what was expected of them and was reported during the battle to be drunk, well behind the lines, and not providing leadership. Ledlie would be dismissed for his actions during the battle. Ledlie, a civilian soldier with no proper military training, also commanded the smallest and weakest division in the army; one brigade was made of heavy artillery regiments that had not performed well in combat so far and Burnside himself had complained about their performance during the June 18 assaults on Petersburg. Worse than that, Ledlie was known as a coward; during the battle on June 18 he had hidden behind the lines and although his officers and enlisted men knew it, this escaped Burnside's notice.

== Opposing forces ==
"Battle of the Crater" from a 1970 National Park Service booklet, read by David Wales for LibriVox
Audio 00:14:21 (full text)

== Battle ==
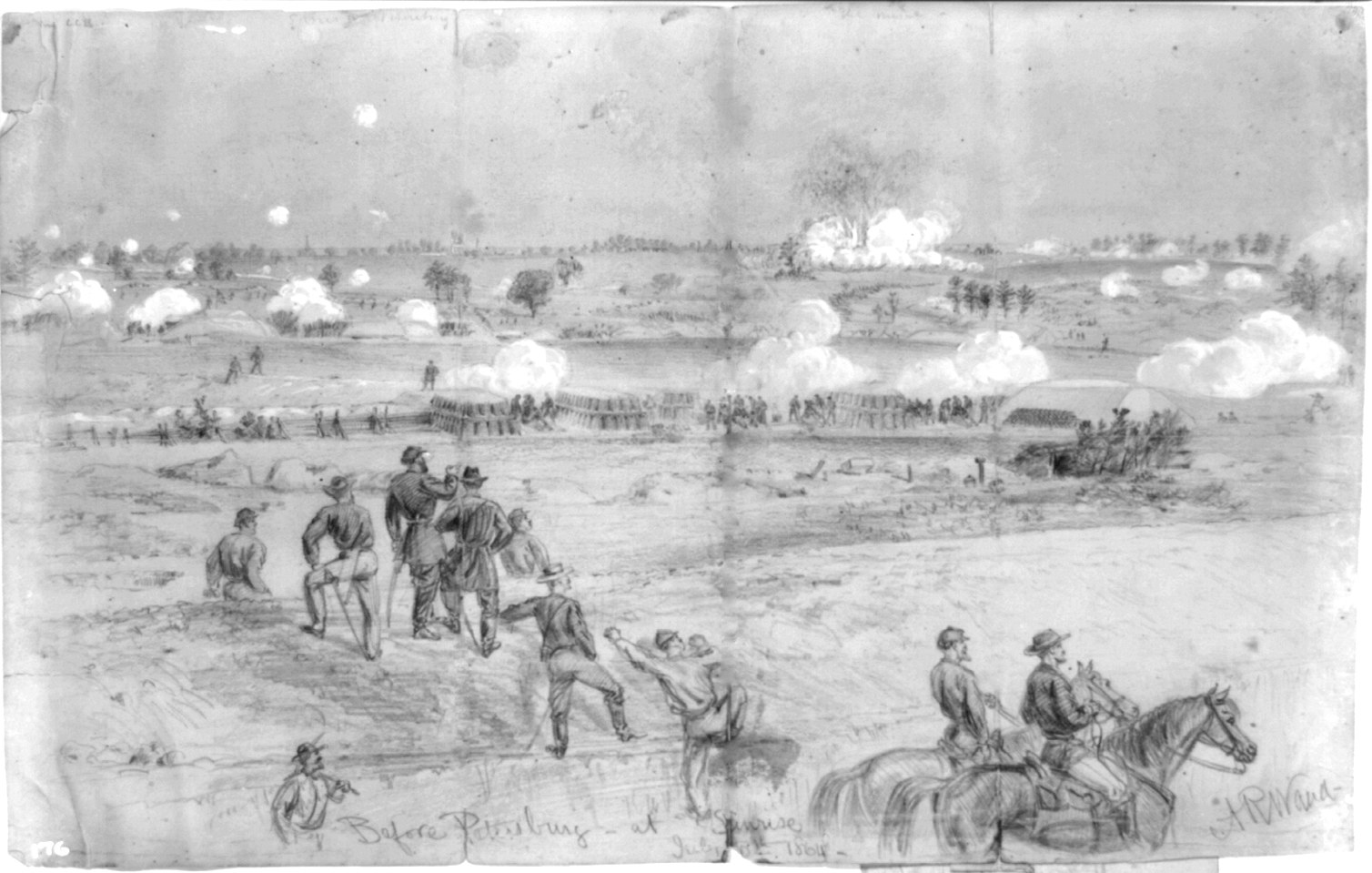
Sketch of the explosion, as seen from the Union line, by Alfred Waud

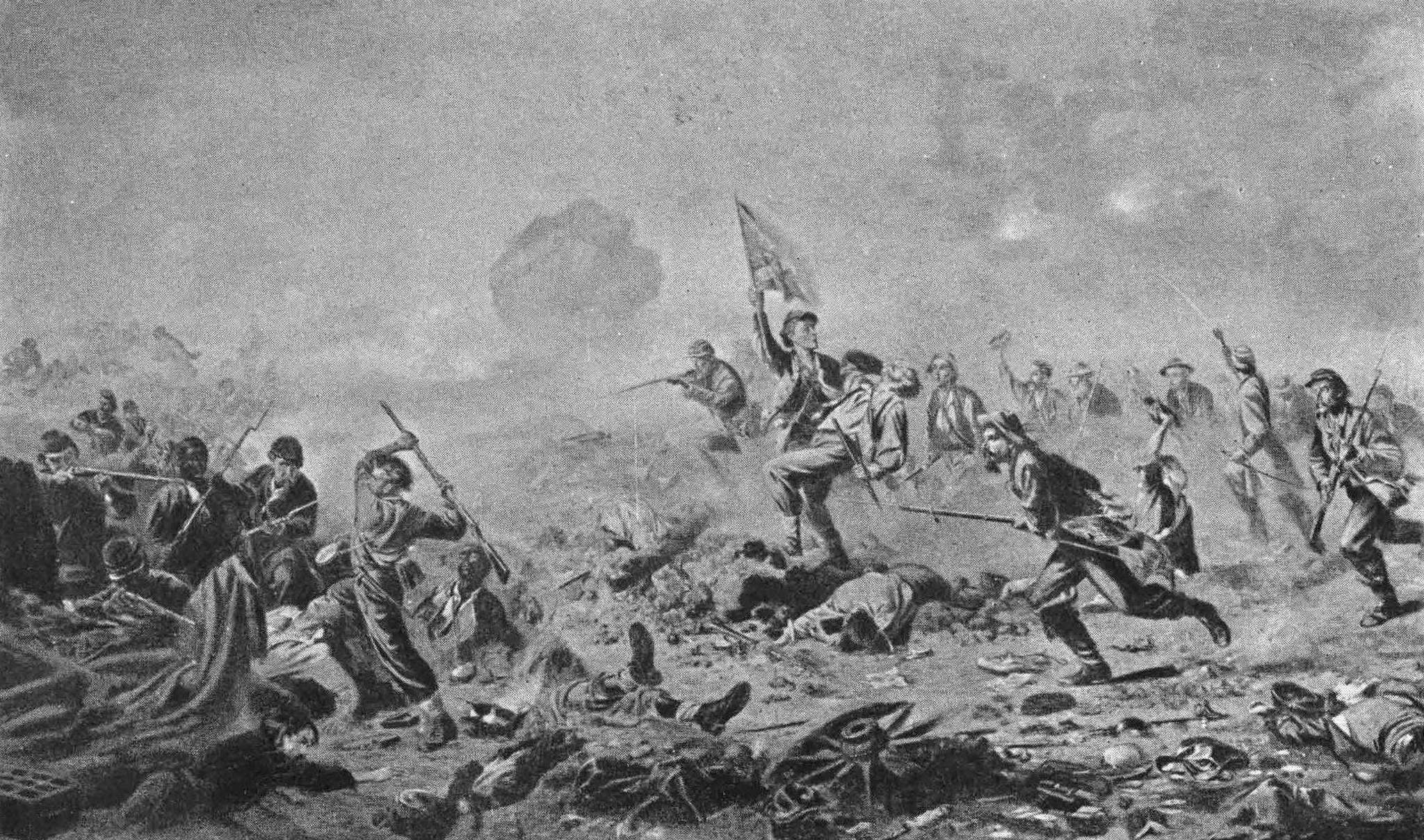
Battle of the Crater art from the Virginia Tech Bugle 1899 yearbook

The plan called for the mine to be detonated between 3:30 and 3:45 a.m. on the morning of July 30. Pleasants lit the fuse accordingly, but as with the rest of the mine's provisions, they had been given poor-quality fuses, which his men were forced to splice themselves. After more and more time passed and no explosion occurred (the impending dawn creating a threat to the men at the staging points, who were in view of the Confederate lines), two volunteers from the 48th Regiment (Lt. Jacob Douty and Sgt. Harry Reese) crawled into the tunnel. After discovering the fuse had burned out at a splice, they spliced on a length of new fuse and lit it again. Finally, at 4:44 a.m., the charges exploded in a massive shower of earth, men, and guns. A crater (still visible today) was created, 170 feet (52 m) long, 100 to 120 feet (30 to 37 m) wide, and at least 30 feet (9 m) deep.

The explosion immediately killed 278 Confederate soldiers of the 18th and 22nd South Carolina and the stunned Confederate troops did not direct any significant rifle or artillery fire at the enemy for at least 15 minutes. However, Ledlie's untrained division was not prepared for the explosion, and reports indicate they waited 10 minutes before leaving their own entrenchments. Footbridges were supposed to have been placed to allow them to cross their own trenches quickly. Because they were missing, however, the men had to climb into and out of their own trenches just to reach no-man's land. Once they had wandered to the crater, instead of moving around it, as the USCT troops had been trained, they thought that it would make an excellent rifle pit in which to take cover. They therefore moved down into the crater itself, wasting valuable time and realizing too late that the crater was much too deep and exposed to function as a rifle pit and quickly becoming overcrowded while the Confederates, under Brigadier General William Mahone, gathered as many troops together as they could for a counterattack. In about an hour, they had formed up around the crater and began firing rifles and artillery down into it in what Mahone later described as a "turkey shoot".

Sensing that the plan had failed, Grant sent Meade an order to terminate the attack. Meade passed this order on to Burnside but the latter believed it could still work and ignored the order, so he sent in Ferrero's division. Burnside preferred to work from his headquarters so he had only a vague idea of what was going on at the front lines as disaster was unfolding. Now faced with considerable flanking fire, the USCT also descended into the crater, and for the next few hours, Mahone's soldiers, along with those of Major General Bushrod Johnson and artillery, slaughtered the IX Corps as Union soldiers attempted to escape from the crater or surrender.

Some of the officers in Ferrero's division removed their USCT badges, fearing the Confederates would also kill them on-site if they were captured and accounts by survivors of the battle report that some bayoneted black soldiers in the hope that the Confederates would be more lenient to them if they were captured. Ferrero himself was AWOL, having joined Ledlie in the rear to drink alcohol together. Union troops from BG Orlando Willcox's 3rd Division, primarily being the three Michigan regiments in his 2nd Brigade, the 1st Michigan Sharpshooters Regiment, the 2nd Michigan Infantry Regiment, and the 20th Michigan Infantry Regiment eventually advanced and flanked to the right beyond the crater to the earthworks and assaulted the Confederate lines, driving the Confederates back for several hours in hand-to-hand combat until finally being beaten back and forced into the crater. Some Union officers saw dying members of Company K of the 1st Michigan Sharpshooters, who were all Native Americans, sing a death song and died, four to a group. Mahone's Confederates conducted a sweep out of a sunken gully area about 200 yards (180 m) from the right side of the Union advance. The charge reclaimed the earthworks and drove the Union force back towards the east. The Confederates rained mortar shells into the crater, killing scores of men in the process.

The weather was also very hot, and as it neared noon the sun beat down on the crater relentlessly. Soldiers who were not killed outright by the Confederates dropped by the dozens from dehydration and heat stroke, worsened by the frantic mob of men jammed into a small area. Survivors could remember little due to the chaos in the crater, the shell fire, and the extreme heat. Some details were organized to pick up cartridges from the dead or run back to the Union lines to fetch water.

== Aftermath ==
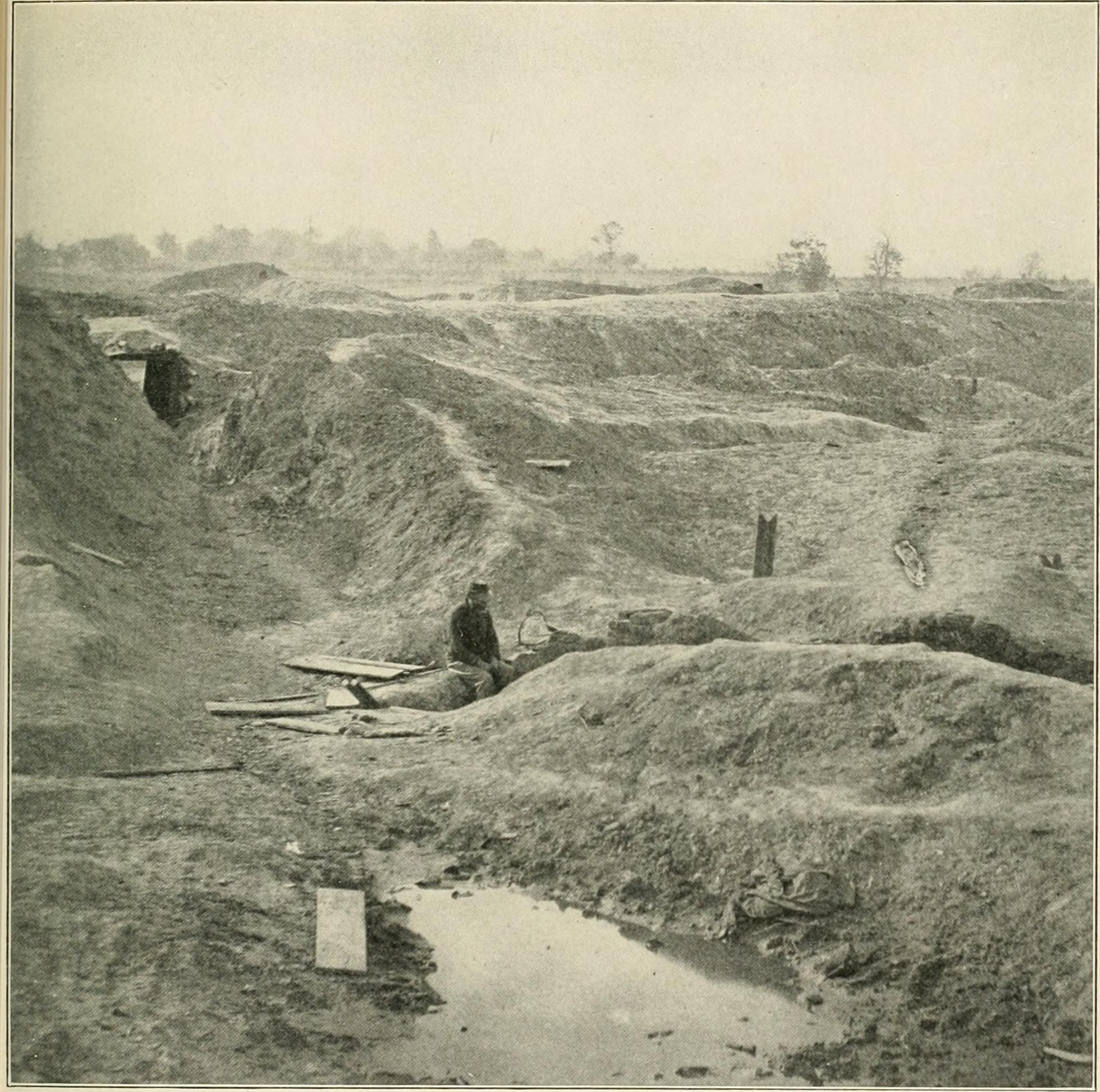
Result of the 8,000 lb (3,600 kg) of powder explosion under the Salient, 1865

Following the Crater affair a Reb wrote his homefolk that all the colored prisoners "would have been killed had it not been for gen Mahone who beg our men to Spare them." One of his comrades killed several, he continued; Mahone "told him for God's sake stop." The man replied, "Well gen let me kill one more," whereupon, according to the correspondent, "he deliberately took out his pocket knife and cut one's throat."

— Bell I. Wiley, The Life of Johnny Reb: The Common Soldier of the Confederacy

Union casualties were 3,798 (504 killed, 1,881 wounded, 1,413 missing or captured), Confederate 1,491 (361 killed, 727 wounded, 403 missing or captured). Disproportionate Union losses were suffered by Ferrero's division of the United States Colored Troops, many of whom were summarily executed on the battlefield or in the rear. Compared to the average ratio for Civil War battles of 4.8 wounded to one dead, for black troops at the Crater it was 1.8 to one. Both black and white wounded prisoners were taken to the Confederate hospital at Poplar Lawn, in Petersburg. Burnside had not given up hope and he petitioned Meade to let him try another attack but General E.O.C. Ord dismissed the idea as absurd. Meade brought charges against Burnside, and a subsequent court of inquiry censured him along with Brig. Gens. Ledlie, Ferrero, Orlando B. Willcox, and Col. Zenas R. Bliss. Burnside was removed from command of the IX Corps on August 26 and replaced with General John G. Parke. Although he was as responsible for the defeat as Burnside, Meade escaped immediate censure. However, in early 1865, the Congressional Joint Committee on the Conduct of the War exonerated Burnside and condemned Meade for changing the plan of attack, which did little good for Burnside, whose reputation had been ruined. As for Mahone, the victory, won largely because of his efforts in supporting Johnson's stunned men, earned him a lasting reputation as one of the best young generals of Lee's army in the last years of the war.

Grant wrote to Chief of Staff Henry W. Halleck, "It was the saddest affair I have witnessed in this war." He also stated to Halleck, "Such an opportunity for carrying fortifications I have never seen and do not expect again to have."

Pleasants, who had no role in the battle itself, received praise for his idea and its execution. When he was appointed a brevet brigadier general on March 13, 1865, the citation made explicit mention of his role.

Grant subsequently gave in his evidence before the Committee on the Conduct of the War:

General Burnside wanted to put his colored division in front, and I believe if he had done so it would have been a success. Still I agreed with General Meade as to his objections to that plan. General Meade said that if we put the colored troops in front (we had only one division) and it should prove a failure, it would then be said and very properly, that we were shoving these people ahead to get killed because we did not care anything about them. But that could not be said if we put white troops in front."

Despite the battle being a tactical Confederate victory, the strategic situation in the Eastern Theater remained unchanged. Both sides remained in their trenches, and the siege continued.

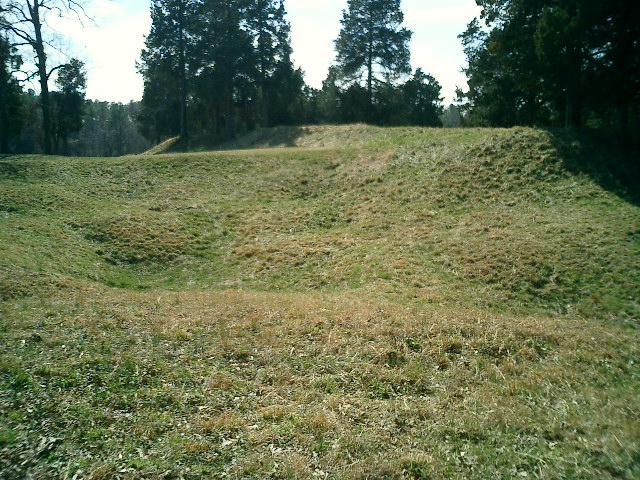
The Crater in 2004

== Historic site ==
The area of the Battle of the Crater is a frequently visited portion of Petersburg National Battlefield. There are sunken areas, where air shafts and cave-ins extend up to the "T" shape near the end. The park includes many other sites, primarily those that were a portion of the Union lines around Petersburg.

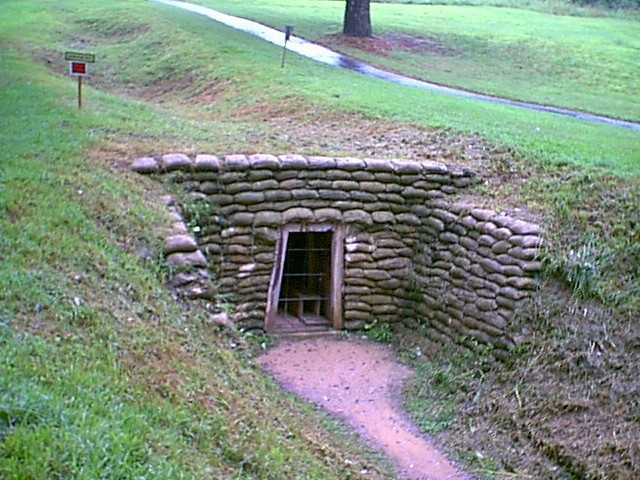
Mine entrance in 2006

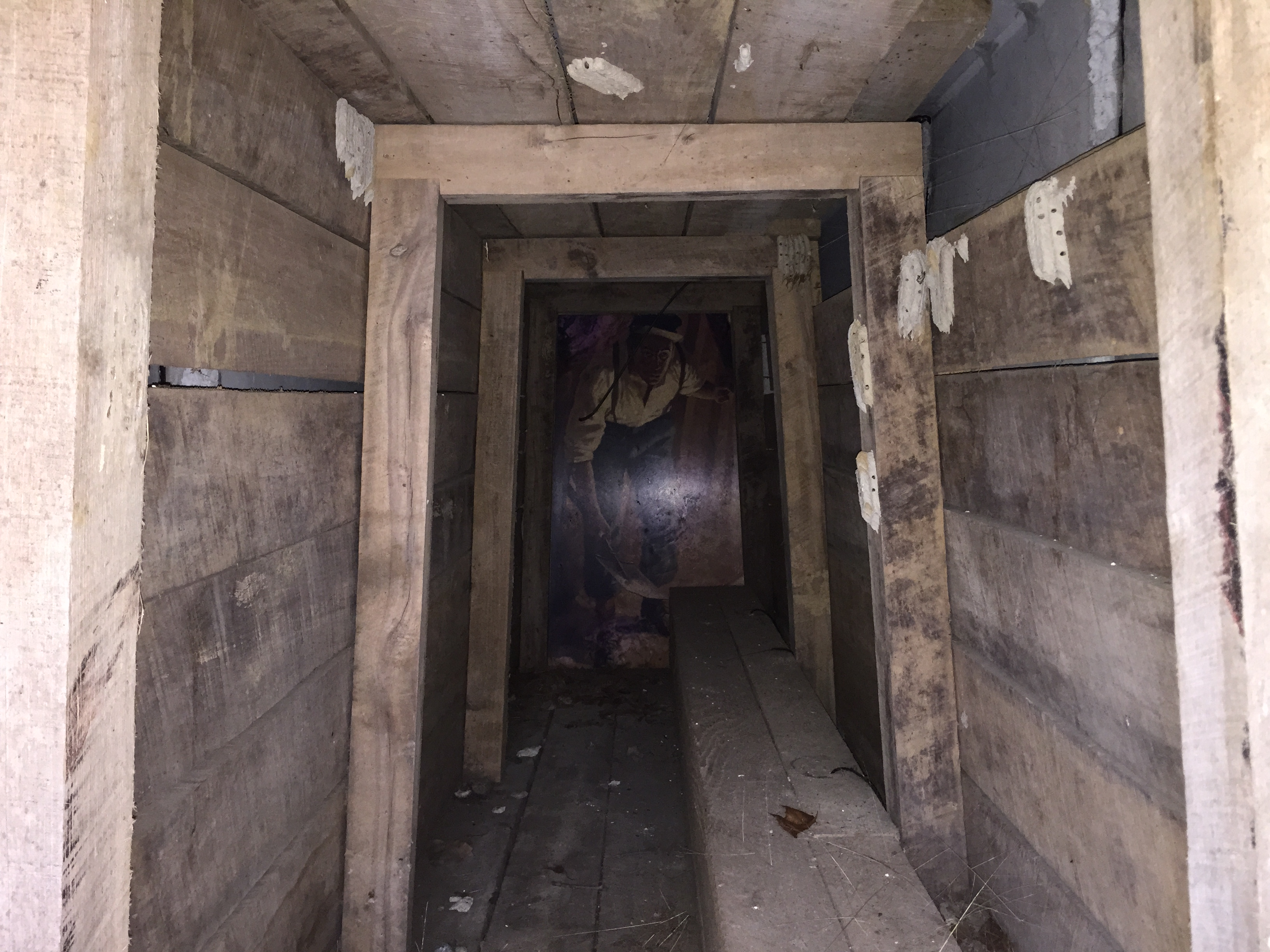
Interior of Mine entrance in 2015

== In popular culture ==
- The Battle of the Crater was graphically portrayed in the opening scenes of the 2003 film Cold Mountain, starring Jude Law as a Confederate soldier. The film inaccurately depicts the giant explosion occurring in broad daylight; it actually happened in darkness at 4:44 a.m.
- The Battle of the Crater is one of the events covered in the Doctor Who audio drama Renaissance of the Daleks.

== See also ==
- Lochnagar mine from the Battle of the Somme in the First World War
