= Battle of Spotsylvania Court House order of battle: Confederate =

The following Confederate States Army units and commanders fought in the Battle of Spotsylvania Court House (May 8–21, 1864) of the American Civil War. The Union order of battle is listed separately. Order of battle compiled from the army organization May 7–12, 1864, army organization May 13–25, 1864, the army organization during the Campaign and the reports.

== Abbreviations used ==
=== Military rank ===
- Gen = General
- LTG = Lieutenant General
- MG = Major General
- BG = Brigadier General
- Col = Colonel
- Ltc = Lieutenant Colonel
- Maj = Major
- Cpt = Captain

=== Other ===
- (w) = wounded
- (mw) = mortally wounded
- (k) = killed in action
- (c) = captured

== Army of Northern Virginia May 8–13, 1864 ==
Gen Robert E. Lee

General Staff:

- Chief Engineer: MG Martin L. Smith
- Chief of Artillery: BG William N. Pendleton
- Assistant Adjutant General: Ltc Walter H. Taylor
- Aide de Camp: Ltc Charles Marshall
- Aide de Camp: Maj Charles S. Venable

=== First Corps ===
MG Richard H. Anderson

Division	Brigade	Regiments and Others
McLaws' (old) Division; BG Joseph B. Kershaw	Kershaw's Brigade Col John W. Henagan	2nd South Carolina; 3rd South Carolina; 7th South Carolina; 8th South Carolina; 15th South Carolina; 3rd South Carolina Battalion
McLaws' (old) Division; BG Joseph B. Kershaw	Humphreys' Brigade BG Benjamin G. Humphreys	13th Mississippi; 17th Mississippi; 18th Mississippi; 21st Mississippi
McLaws' (old) Division; BG Joseph B. Kershaw	Wofford's Brigade BG William T. Wofford	16th Georgia; 18th Georgia; 24th Georgia; Cobb's (Georgia) Legion; Philip's (Georgia) Legion; 3rd Georgia Battalion Sharpshooters
McLaws' (old) Division; BG Joseph B. Kershaw	Bryan's Brigade BG Goode Bryan	10th Georgia; 50th Georgia; 51st Georgia; 53rd Georgia
Field's Division; MG Charles W. Field	Jenkins' Brigade Col John Bratton	1st South Carolina (Volunteers); 2nd South Carolina Rifles; 5th South Carolina; 6th South Carolina; Palmetto (South Carolina) Sharpshooters
Field's Division; MG Charles W. Field	Gregg's Brigade BG John Gregg	3rd Arkansas; 1st Texas; 4th Texas; 5th Texas
Field's Division; MG Charles W. Field	Law's Brigade Col William F. Perry	4th Alabama; 15th Alabama; 44th Alabama; 47th Alabama; 48th Alabama
Field's Division; MG Charles W. Field	Anderson's Brigade BG George T. Anderson	7th Georgia; 8th Georgia; 9th Georgia; 11th Georgia; 59th Georgia
Field's Division; MG Charles W. Field	Benning's Brigade Col Dudley M. Du Bose	2nd Georgia; 15th Georgia; 17th Georgia; 20th Georgia
Artillery; BG Edward P. Alexander	Huger's Battalion Ltc Frank Huger	Fickling's (South Carolina) Battery; Moody's (Louisiana) Battery; Parker's (Virginia) Battery; Smith's (Virginia) Battery; Taylor's (Virginia) Battery; Woolfolk's (Virginia) Battery
Artillery; BG Edward P. Alexander	Haskell's Battalion Maj John C. Haskell	Flanner's (North Carolina) Battery; Garden's (South Carolina) Battery; Lamkin's (Virginia) Battery; Ramsay's (North Carolina) Battery
Artillery; BG Edward P. Alexander	Cabell's Battalion Col Henry C. Cabell	Callaway's (Georgia) Battery; Carlton's (Georgia) Battery; McCarthy's (Virginia) Battery; Manly's (North Carolina) Battery

=== Second Corps ===
LTG Richard S. Ewell

General Staff:

- Assistant Adjutant General: Ltc Alexander S. Pendleton
- Assistant Adjutant General: Maj Campbell Brown
- Assistant Inspector General: Col Abner Smead
- Engineer: Maj Benjamin H. Greene
- Aide de Camp: Lt Thomas T. Turner (w)
- Chief of Ordnance: Ltc William Allan
- Medical Director: Dr. Hunter H. McGuire
- Quartermasters: Maj John D. Rogers and Maj A. M. Garber
- Commissaries and subsistence: Maj Wells J. Hawks and Cpt J. J. Lock

Division	Brigade	Regiments and Others
Early's Division; MG Jubal A. Early; BG John B. Gordon	Pegram's Brigade Col John S. Hoffman	13th Virginia; 31st Virginia; 49th Virginia; 52nd Virginia; 58th Virginia
Early's Division; MG Jubal A. Early; BG John B. Gordon	Johnston's Brigade BG Robert D. Johnston (w); Col Thomas M. Garrett (k); Col Thomas F. Toon	5th North Carolina: Col Thomas M. Garrett; 12th North Carolina; 20th North Carolina: Col Thomas F. Toon; 23rd North Carolina
Early's Division; MG Jubal A. Early; BG John B. Gordon	Gordon's Brigade BG John B. Gordon; Col Clement A. Evans	13th Georgia; 26th Georgia; 31st Georgia: Col Clement A. Evans; 38th Georgia; 60th Georgia; 61st Georgia
Johnson's Division; MG Edward Johnson (c)	Stonewall Brigade BG James A. Walker (w); Col John H. S. Funk	2nd Virginia; 4th Virginia; 5th Virginia: Col John H. S. Funk; 27th Virginia; 33rd Virginia
Johnson's Division; MG Edward Johnson (c)	Jones' Brigade Col William Witcher (w); Col John C. Higginbotham (k); Col Robert H. Dungan	21st Virginia; 25th Virginia: Col John C. Higginbotham; 42nd Virginia; 44th Virginia; 48th Virginia: Col Robert H. Dungan; 50th Virginia
Johnson's Division; MG Edward Johnson (c)	Steuart's Brigade BG George H. Steuart (c); Col Titus V. Williams	1st North Carolina; 3rd North Carolina; 10th Virginia; 23rd Virginia; 37th Virginia: Col Titus V. Williams
Johnson's Division; MG Edward Johnson (c)	Hays' and Stafford's Brigade BG Harry T. Hays (w); Col William Monaghan; Col Jesse M. Williams (k); Col Zebulon York	Hays' Brigade: 5th Louisiana; 6th Louisiana: Col William Monaghan; 7th Louisiana; 8th Louisiana; 9th Louisiana; Stafford's Brigade: 1st Louisiana (Volunteers); 2nd Louisiana: Col Jesse M. Williams; 10th Louisiana; 14th Louisiana: Col Zebulon York; 15th Louisiana
Rodes' Division; MG Robert E. Rodes	Daniel's Brigade BG Junius Daniel (mw); Ltc James T. Morehead, Jr. Col Bryan Grimes	32nd North Carolina; 45th North Carolina; 53rd North Carolina: Ltc James T. Morehead, Jr.; 2nd North Carolina Battalion
Rodes' Division; MG Robert E. Rodes	Ramseur's Brigade BG Stephen D. Ramseur (w)	2nd North Carolina; 4th North Carolina: Col Bryan Grimes; 14th North Carolina; 30th North Carolina
Rodes' Division; MG Robert E. Rodes	Battle's Brigade BG Cullen A. Battle (w)	3rd Alabama; 5th Alabama; 6th Alabama; 12th Alabama; 61st Alabama
Rodes' Division; MG Robert E. Rodes	Doles' Brigade BG George P. Doles	4th Georgia; 12th Georgia; 21st Georgia, Company E; 44th Georgia
Artillery; BG Armistead L. Long; Col Thomas H. Carter	Hardaway's Battalion Ltc Robert A. Hardaway (w); Maj David Watson (mw); Cpt Willis J. Dance; Maj Wilfred E. Cutshaw	Dance's (Virginia) Battery: Cpt Willis J. Dance; Graham's (Virginia) Battery; C. B. Griffin's (Virginia) Battery; Jones's (Virginia) Battery; B. H. Smith's (Virginia) Battery
Artillery; BG Armistead L. Long; Col Thomas H. Carter	Nelson's Battalion Ltc William Nelson	Kirkpatrick's (Virginia) Battery; Massie's (Virginia) Battery; Milledge's (Georgia) Battery
Artillery; BG Armistead L. Long; Col Thomas H. Carter	Braxton's Battalion Ltc Carter M. Braxton	Carpenter's (Virginia) Battery; Cooper's (Virginia) Battery; Hardwicke's (Virginia) Battery
Artillery; BG Armistead L. Long; Col Thomas H. Carter	Cutshaw's Battalion Maj Wilfred E. Cutshaw	Carrington's (Virginia) Battery; A. W. Garber's (Virginia) Battery; Tanner's (Virginia) Battery
Artillery; BG Armistead L. Long; Col Thomas H. Carter	Page's Battalion Maj Richard C. M. Page	W. P. Carter's (Virginia) Battery; Fry's (Virginia) Battery; Page's (Virginia) Battery; Reese's (Alabama) Battery

=== Third Corps ===
LTG Ambrose P. Hill
MG Jubal A. Early

Division	Brigade	Regiments and Others
Anderson's Division; BG William Mahone	Perrin's Brigade BG Abner M. Perrin (k); Col John C. C. Sanders	8th Alabama; 9th Alabama; 10th Alabama; 11th Alabama: Col John C. C. Sanders; 14th Alabama
Anderson's Division; BG William Mahone	Mahone's Brigade Col David A. Weisiger	6th Virginia; 12th Virginia; 16th Virginia; 41st Virginia; 61st Virginia
Anderson's Division; BG William Mahone	Harris's Brigade BG Nathaniel H. Harris	12th Mississippi; 16th Mississippi; 19th Mississippi; 48th Mississippi
Anderson's Division; BG William Mahone	Perry's Brigade Col David Lang	2nd Florida; 5th Florida; 8th Florida
Anderson's Division; BG William Mahone	Wright's Brigade BG Ambrose R. Wright	3rd Georgia; 22nd Georgia; 48th Georgia; 2nd Georgia Battalion; 10th Georgia Battalion
Heth's Division; MG Henry Heth	Davis's Brigade BG Joseph R. Davis	1st Confederate Battalion; 2nd Mississippi; 11th Mississippi; 26th Mississippi; 42nd Mississippi; 55th North Carolina
Heth's Division; MG Henry Heth	Cooke's Brigade BG John R. Cooke (w)	15th North Carolina; 27th North Carolina; 46th North Carolina; 48th North Carolina
Heth's Division; MG Henry Heth	Archer's and Walker's Brigade BG Henry H. Walker (w); Col Robert M. Mayo	Archer's Brigade: 13th Alabama; 1st Tennessee (Provisional Army); 7th Tennessee; 14th Tennessee; Walker's Brigade: 40th Virginia; 47th Virginia: Col Robert M. Mayo; 55th Virginia; 22nd Virginia Battalion
Heth's Division; MG Henry Heth	Kirkland's Brigade BG William W. Kirkland	11th North Carolina; 26th North Carolina; 44th North Carolina; 47th North Carolina; 52nd North Carolina
Wilcox's Division; MG Cadmus M. Wilcox	Lane's Brigade BG James H. Lane	7th North Carolina; 18th North Carolina; 28th North Carolina; 33rd North Carolina; 37th North Carolina
Wilcox's Division; MG Cadmus M. Wilcox	McGowan's Brigade BG Samuel McGowan (w); Col Benjamin T. Brockman (mw); Col Joseph N. Brown	1st South Carolina (Provisional Army); 1st South Carolina Rifles; 12th South Carolina; 13th South Carolina: Col Benjamin T. Brockman; 14th South Carolina: Col Joseph N. Brown
Wilcox's Division; MG Cadmus M. Wilcox	Scales' Brigade BG Alfred M. Scales; Col William L. J. Lowrance	13th North Carolina; 16th North Carolina; 22nd North Carolina; 34th North Carolina: Col William L. J. Lowrance; 38th North Carolina
Wilcox's Division; MG Cadmus M. Wilcox	Thomas' Brigade BG Edward L. Thomas	14th Georgia; 35th Georgia; 45th Georgia; 49th Georgia
Artillery; Col Reuben L. Walker	Poague's Battalion Ltc William T. Poague	Richard's (Mississippi) Battery; Utterback's (Virginia) Battery; William's (North Carolina) Battery; Wyatt's (Virginia) Battery
Artillery; Col Reuben L. Walker	Pegram's Battalion Ltc William J. Pegram	Brander's (Virginia) Battery; Cayce's (Virginia) Battery; Ellett's (Virginia) Battery; Marye's (Virginia) Battery; Zimmerman's (South Carolina) Battery
Artillery; Col Reuben L. Walker	McIntosh's Battalion Ltc David G. McIntosh	Clutter's (Virginia) Battery; Donald's (Virginia) Battery; Hurt's (Alabama) Battery; Price's (Virginia) Battery
Artillery; Col Reuben L. Walker	Cutts' Battalion Col Allen S. Cutts	Patterson's (Georgia) Battery; Ross' (Georgia) Battery; Wingfield's (Georgia) Battery
Artillery; Col Reuben L. Walker	Richardson's Battalion Ltc Charles Richardson (w); Maj Merritt B. Miller	Grandy's (Virginia) Battery; Landry's (Louisiana) Battery; Moore's (Virginia) Battery; Penick's (Virginia) Battery

=== Cavalry Corps ===
MG J.E.B. Stuart (mw)

Division	Brigade	Regiments and Others
Hampton's Division; MG Wade Hampton	Young's Brigade Col Gilbert J. Wright	Cobb's (Georgia) Legion; Philip's (Georgia) Legion; Jeff. Davis (Mississippi) Legion
Hampton's Division; MG Wade Hampton	Rosser's Brigade BG Thomas L. Rosser	7th Virginia; 11th Virginia; 12th Virginia; 35th Virginia Battalion
Fitzhugh Lee's Division; MG Fitzhugh Lee	Lomax' Brigade BG Lunsford L. Lomax	1st Maryland; 5th Virginia; 6th Virginia; 15th Virginia
Fitzhugh Lee's Division; MG Fitzhugh Lee	Wickham's Brigade Col Thomas T. Munford; BG Williams C. Wickham	1st Virginia; 2nd Virginia; 3rd Virginia; 4th Virginia
William H. F. Lee's Division; MG William H. F. Lee	Chambliss' Brigade BG John R. Chambliss	9th Virginia; 10th Virginia; 13th Virginia
William H. F. Lee's Division; MG William H. F. Lee	Gordon's Brigade BG James B. Gordon (mw); Col Clinton M. Andrews	1st North Carolina; 2nd North Carolina: Col Clinton M. Andrews; 5th North Carolina
Horse Artillery; Maj R. Preston Chew	Breathed's Battalion Maj James Breathed	Griffin's (Maryland) Battery; Hart's (South Carolina) Battery; Johnston's (Virginia) Battery; McGregor's (Virginia) Battery; Shoemaker's (Virginia) Battery; Thomson's (Virginia) Battery

== Army of Northern Virginia May 14–21, 1864 ==
Gen Robert E. Lee

General Staff:

- Chief Engineer: MG Martin L. Smith
- Chief of Artillery: BG William N. Pendleton
- Assistant Adjutant General: Ltc Walter H. Taylor
- Aide de Camp: Ltc Charles Marshall
- Aide de Camp: Maj Charles S. Venable

=== First Corps ===
MG Richard H. Anderson

Division	Brigade	Regiments and Others
McLaws' (old) Division; BG Joseph B. Kershaw	Kershaw's Brigade Col John W. Henagan	2nd South Carolina; 3rd South Carolina; 7th South Carolina; 8th South Carolina; 15th South Carolina; 3rd South Carolina Battalion
McLaws' (old) Division; BG Joseph B. Kershaw	Humphreys' Brigade BG Benjamin G. Humphreys	13th Mississippi; 17th Mississippi; 18th Mississippi; 21st Mississippi
McLaws' (old) Division; BG Joseph B. Kershaw	Wofford's Brigade BG William T. Wofford	16th Georgia; 18th Georgia; 24th Georgia; Cobb's (Georgia) Legion; Philip's (Georgia) Legion; 3rd Georgia Battalion Sharpshooters
McLaws' (old) Division; BG Joseph B. Kershaw	Bryan's Brigade BG Goode Bryan	10th Georgia; 50th Georgia; 51st Georgia; 53rd Georgia
Field's Division; MG Charles W. Field	Jenkins' Brigade Col John Bratton	1st South Carolina (Volunteers); 2nd South Carolina Rifles; 5th South Carolina; 6th South Carolina; Palmetto (South Carolina) Sharpshooters
Field's Division; MG Charles W. Field	Gregg's Brigade BG John Gregg	3rd Arkansas; 1st Texas; 4th Texas; 5th Texas
Field's Division; MG Charles W. Field	Law's Brigade Col William F. Perry; BG Evander M. Law	4th Alabama; 15th Alabama; 44th Alabama; 47th Alabama; 48th Alabama
Field's Division; MG Charles W. Field	Anderson's Brigade BG George T. Anderson	7th Georgia; 8th Georgia; 9th Georgia; 11th Georgia; 59th Georgia
Field's Division; MG Charles W. Field	Benning's Brigade Col Dudley M. Du Bose	2nd Georgia; 15th Georgia; 17th Georgia; 20th Georgia
Pickett's Division; MG George E. Pickett	Kemper's Brigade Col William R. Terry	1st Virginia; 3rd Virginia; 7th Virginia; 11th Virginia; 24th Virginia
Pickett's Division; MG George E. Pickett	Corse's Brigade BG Montgomery D. Corse	15th Virginia; 17th Virginia; 29th Virginia; 30th Virginia; 32nd Virginia
Artillery; BG Edward P. Alexander	Huger's Battalion Ltc Frank Huger	Fickling's (South Carolina) Battery; Moody's (Louisiana) Battery; Parker's (Virginia) Battery; Smith's (Virginia) Battery; Taylor's (Virginia) Battery; Woolfolk's (Virginia) Battery
Artillery; BG Edward P. Alexander	Haskell's Battalion Maj John C. Haskell	Flanner's (North Carolina) Battery; Garden's (South Carolina) Battery; Lamkin's (Virginia) Battery; Ramsay's (North Carolina) Battery
Artillery; BG Edward P. Alexander	Cabell's Battalion Col Henry C. Cabell	Callaway's (Georgia) Battery; Carlton's (Georgia) Battery; McCarthy's (Virginia) Battery; Manly's (North Carolina) Battery

=== Second Corps ===
LTG Richard S. Ewell

General Staff:

- Assistant Adjutant General: Ltc Alexander S. Pendleton
- Assistant Adjutant General: Maj Campbell Brown
- Assistant Inspector General: Col Abner Smead
- Engineer: Maj Benjamin H. Greene
- Chief of Ordnance: Ltc William Allan
- Medical Director: Dr. Hunter H. McGuire
- Quartermasters: Maj John D. Rogers and Maj A. M. Garber
- Commissaries and subsistence: Maj Wells J. Hawks and Cpt J. J. Lock

Division	Brigade	Regiments and Others
Early's Division; BG John B. Gordon; MG Jubal A. Early	Pegram's Brigade Col John S. Hoffman	13th Virginia; 31st Virginia; 49th Virginia; 52nd Virginia; 58th Virginia
Early's Division; BG John B. Gordon; MG Jubal A. Early	Johnston's Brigade Col Thomas F. Toon	5th North Carolina; 12th North Carolina; 20th North Carolina; 23rd North Carolina
Early's Division; BG John B. Gordon; MG Jubal A. Early	Gordon's Brigade Col Clement A. Evans	13th Georgia; 26th Georgia; 31st Georgia; 38th Georgia; 60th Georgia; 61st Georgia; 12th Georgia Artillery Battalion
Early's Division; BG John B. Gordon; MG Jubal A. Early	Hays' and Stafford's Brigade Col Zebulon York	Hays’ Brigade: 5th Louisiana; 6th Louisiana: Col William Monaghan; 7th Louisiana; 8th Louisiana; 9th Louisiana; Stafford's Brigade: 1st Louisiana; 2nd Louisiana; 10th Louisiana; 14th Louisiana: Col Zebulon York; 15th Louisiana
Early's Division; BG John B. Gordon; MG Jubal A. Early	Terry's Brigade Col William Terry	Stonewall Brigade consolidated: 2nd Virginia; 4th Virginia; 5th Virginia; 27th Virginia; 33rd Virginia; Jones' Brigade consolidated: 21st Virginia; 25th Virginia; 42nd Virginia; 44th Virginia; 48th Virginia; 50th Virginia; Steuart's Brigade consolidated: 10th Virginia; 23rd Virginia; 37th Virginia
Early's Division; BG John B. Gordon; MG Jubal A. Early	Hoke's (old) Brigade Ltc William G. Lewis	6th North Carolina; 21st North Carolina; 54th North Carolina; 57th North Carolina; 1st North Carolina Battalion Sharpshooters
Rodes' Division; MG Robert E. Rodes	Daniel's Brigade Col Bryan Grimes	32nd North Carolina; 43rd North Carolina; 45th North Carolina; 53rd North Carolina; 2nd North Carolina Battalion
Rodes' Division; MG Robert E. Rodes	Ramseur's Brigade BG Stephen D. Ramseur	1st North Carolina; 2nd North Carolina; 3rd North Carolina; 4th North Carolina; 14th North Carolina; 30th North Carolina
Rodes' Division; MG Robert E. Rodes	Battle's Brigade BG Cullen A. Battle	3rd Alabama; 5th Alabama; 6th Alabama; 12th Alabama; 61st Alabama
Rodes' Division; MG Robert E. Rodes	Doles' Brigade BG George P. Doles	4th Georgia; 12th Georgia; 21st Georgia; 44th Georgia
Artillery; BG Armistead L. Long; Col Thomas H. Carter	Hardaway's Battalion Maj Wilfred E. Cutshaw; Ltc Robert A. Hardaway	Dance's (Virginia) Battery; Graham's (Virginia) Battery; C. B. Griffin's (Virginia) Battery; Jones's (Virginia) Battery; B. H. Smith's (Virginia) Battery
Artillery; BG Armistead L. Long; Col Thomas H. Carter	Braxton's Battalion Ltc Carter M. Braxton	Carpenter's (Virginia) Battery; Cooper's (Virginia) Battery; Hardwicke's (Virginia) Battery
Artillery; BG Armistead L. Long; Col Thomas H. Carter	Nelson's Battalion Ltc William Nelson	Kirkpatrick's (Virginia) Battery; Massie's (Virginia) Battery; Milledge's (Georgia) Battery
Artillery; BG Armistead L. Long; Col Thomas H. Carter	Cutshaw's Battalion Maj Richard C. M. Page	Fry's (Virginia) Battery; A. W. Garber's (Virginia) Battery; Tanner's (Virginia) Battery

=== Third Corps ===
MG Jubal A. Early
LTG Ambrose P. Hill

Division	Brigade	Regiments and Others
Anderson's Division; BG William Mahone	Perrin's Brigade Col John C. C. Sanders	8th Alabama; 9th Alabama; 10th Alabama; 11th Alabama; 14th Alabama
Anderson's Division; BG William Mahone	Mahone's Brigade Col David A. Weisiger	6th Virginia; 12th Virginia; 16th Virginia; 41st Virginia; 61st Virginia
Anderson's Division; BG William Mahone	Harris's Brigade BG Nathaniel H. Harris	12th Mississippi; 16th Mississippi; 19th Mississippi; 48th Mississippi
Anderson's Division; BG William Mahone	Perry's Brigade Col David Lang	2nd Florida; 5th Florida; 8th Florida
Anderson's Division; BG William Mahone	Wright's Brigade BG Ambrose R. Wright; Ltc Matthew R. Hall	3rd Georgia; 22nd Georgia; 48th Georgia: Ltc Matthew R. Hall; 2nd Georgia Battalion; 10th Georgia Battalion
Heth's Division; MG Henry Heth	Davis's Brigade BG Joseph R. Davis	1st Confederate Battalion; 2nd Mississippi; 11th Mississippi; 26th Mississippi; 42nd Mississippi; 55th North Carolina
Heth's Division; MG Henry Heth	Cooke's Brigade BG John R. Cooke	15th North Carolina; 27th North Carolina; 46th North Carolina; 48th North Carolina
Heth's Division; MG Henry Heth	Archer's and Walker's Brigade Col Robert M. Mayo	Archer's Brigade: 13th Alabama; 1st Tennessee (Provisional Army); 7th Tennessee; 14th Tennessee; Walker's Brigade: 40th Virginia; 47th Virginia; 55th Virginia; 22nd Virginia Battalion
Heth's Division; MG Henry Heth	Kirkland's Brigade BG William W. Kirkland	11th North Carolina; 26th North Carolina; 44th North Carolina; 47th North Carolina; 52nd North Carolina
Wilcox's Division; MG Cadmus M. Wilcox	Lane's Brigade BG James H. Lane	7th North Carolina; 18th North Carolina; 28th North Carolina; 33rd North Carolina; 37th North Carolina
Wilcox's Division; MG Cadmus M. Wilcox	McGowan's Brigade Col Joseph N. Brown	1st South Carolina (Provisional Army); 1st South Carolina Rifles; 12th South Carolina; 13th South Carolina; 14th South Carolina
Wilcox's Division; MG Cadmus M. Wilcox	Scales' Brigade BG Alfred M. Scales; Col William L. J. Lowrance	13th North Carolina; 16th North Carolina; 22nd North Carolina; 34th North Carolina: Col William L. J. Lowrance; 38th North Carolina
Wilcox's Division; MG Cadmus M. Wilcox	Thomas' Brigade BG Edward L. Thomas	14th Georgia; 35th Georgia; 45th Georgia; 49th Georgia
Artillery; Col Reuben L. Walker	Poague's Battalion Ltc William T. Poague	Richard's (Mississippi) Battery; Utterback's (Virginia) Battery; William's (North Carolina) Battery; Wyatt's (Virginia) Battery
Artillery; Col Reuben L. Walker	Pegram's Battalion Ltc William J. Pegram	Brander's (Virginia) Battery; Cayce's (Virginia) Battery; Ellett's (Virginia) Battery; Marye's (Virginia) Battery; Zimmerman's (South Carolina) Battery
Artillery; Col Reuben L. Walker	McIntosh's Battalion Ltc David G. McIntosh	Clutter's (Virginia) Battery; Donald's (Virginia) Battery; Hurt's (Alabama) Battery; Price's (Virginia) Battery
Artillery; Col Reuben L. Walker	Cutts' Battalion Col Allen S. Cutts	Patterson's (Georgia) Battery; Ross' (Georgia) Battery; Wingfield's (Georgia) Battery
Artillery; Col Reuben L. Walker	Richardson's Battalion Maj Merritt B. Miller	Grandy's (Virginia) Battery; Landry's (Louisiana) Battery; Moore's (Virginia) Battery; Penick's (Virginia) Battery

=== Cavalry Corps ===
Division	Brigade	Regiments and Others
Hampton's Division; MG Wade Hampton	Young's Brigade Col Gilbert J. Wright	Cobb's (Georgia) Legion; Philip's (Georgia) Legion; Jeff Davis (Mississippi) Legion
Hampton's Division; MG Wade Hampton	Rosser's Brigade BG Thomas L. Rosser	7th Virginia; 11th Virginia; 12th Virginia; 35th Virginia Battalion
Hampton's Division; MG Wade Hampton	Butler's Brigade BG Matthew C. Butler	4th South Carolina; 5th South Carolina; 6th South Carolina
Fitzhugh Lee's Division; MG Fitzhugh Lee	Lomax' Brigade BG Lunsford L. Lomax	1st Maryland; 5th Virginia; 6th Virginia; 15th Virginia
Fitzhugh Lee's Division; MG Fitzhugh Lee	Wickham's Brigade BG Williams C. Wickham	1st Virginia; 2nd Virginia; 3rd Virginia; 4th Virginia
William H. F. Lee's Division; MG William H. F. Lee	Chambliss' Brigade BG John R. Chambliss	9th Virginia; 10th Virginia; 13th Virginia
William H. F. Lee's Division; MG William H. F. Lee	Gordon's Brigade Col Clinton M. Andrews	1st North Carolina; 2nd North Carolina; 5th North Carolina
Horse Artillery; Maj R. Preston Chew	Breathed's Battalion Maj James Breathed	Griffin's (Maryland) Battery; Hart's (South Carolina) Battery; Johnston's (Virginia) Battery; McGregor's (Virginia) Battery; Shoemaker's (Virginia) Battery; Thomson's (Virginia) Battery

== See also ==
- Wilderness Confederate order of battle
- Cold Harbor Confederate order of battle
