= Battle of Cedar Creek order of battle: Confederate =

The following Confederate States Army units and commanders fought in the October 19, 1864 Battle of Cedar Creek, the culminating battle of the Valley Campaigns of 1864 during the American Civil War. Order of battle compiled from the army organization during the campaign. The Union order of battle is listed separately.

== Military rank abbreviations used ==
- LTG = Lieutenant General
- MG = Major General
- BG = Brigadier General
- Col = Colonel
- Ltc = Lieutenant Colonel
- Maj = Major
- Cpt = Captain
- Lt = Lieutenant

== Army of the Valley ==
LTG Jubal Anderson Early, Commanding

=== Infantry ===
Division	Brigade	Regiments and Others
Ramseur's Division (2578 officers & men) MG S.D. Ramseur (k)	Battle's Brigade (743 officers & men) BG Cullen A. Battle (w)	Brigade Staff (7 officers); 3rd Alabama (218 off & men): Col Charles Forsyth; 5th Alabama (131 off & men): Ltc Edwin L. Hobson; 6th Alabama (141 off & men): Cpt Rinaldo M. Greene; 12th Alabama(123 off & men): Cpt Poleman D. Ross; 61st Alabama: Maj William E. Pinckard (123 off & men)
Ramseur's Division (2578 officers & men) MG S.D. Ramseur (k)	Grimes' Brigade (795 officers & men) BG Bryan Grimes	Brigade Staff (2 officers); 32nd North Carolina (94 officers & men): Colonel David G. Cowand; 53rd North Carolina (235 officers & men): Colonel David G. Cowand; 2nd North Carolina Battalion (108 officers & men): Colonel David G. Cowand; 43rd North Carolina (228 officers & men): Colonel John R. Winston; 45th North Carolina (128 officers & men): Colonel John R. Winston
Ramseur's Division (2578 officers & men) MG S.D. Ramseur (k)	Cook's Brigade (444 officers & men) BG Philip Cook	Brigade Staff (6 officers); 4th Georgia (99 officers & men): Ltc William H. Willis; 12th Georgia (112 officers & men): Cpt James Everett; 21st Georgia (135 officers & men): Cpt Henry T. Battle; 44th Georgia (102 officers & men): Ltc James W. Beck
Ramseur's Division (2578 officers & men) MG S.D. Ramseur (k)	Cox's Brigade (579 officers & men) BG William Ruffin Cox	Brigade Staff (7 officers); 1st North Carolina (56 officers & men): Cpt William H. Thomson; 2nd North Carolina (104 officers & men): Cpt. Thomas B. Beall; 3rd North Carolina (52 officers & men): Cpt William H. Thomson; 4th North Carolina (105 officers & men): Col Edwin A. Osborne; 14th North Carolina (137 officers & men): Cpt Joseph Jones; 30th North Carolina (118 officers & men): Cpt John C. McMillan
Pegram's (Early's) Division (1597 off & men) BG John Pegram	Pegram's Brigade (437 officers & men) Col John S. Hoffman	Brigade Staff (3 officers); 13th Virginia Infantry (93 officers & men): Cpt Felix Heiskell; 31st Virginia Infantry (115 officers & men): Ltc J. S. Kerr McCutchen; 49th Virginia Infantry (86 officers & men): Cpt John G. Lobban; 52nd Virginia Infantry (84 officers & men): Cpt John M. Humphreys; 58th Virginia Infantry (56 officers & men): Cpt Leroy C. James
Pegram's (Early's) Division (1597 off & men) BG John Pegram	Johnston's Brigade (436 officers & men) BG Robert D. Johnston	Brigade Staff (9 officers & men); 5th North Carolina Infantry (85 officers & men): Col John W. Lea; 12th North Carolina Infantry (140 officers & men): Col Henry E. Coleman; 20th North Carolina Infantry (106 officers & men): Col Thomas F. Toon; 23rd North Carolina Infantry (96 officers & men): Col Charles Blacknall; 1st North Carolina Battalion Sharpshooters (Not Reported): Cpt R. E. Wilson
Pegram's (Early's) Division (1597 off & men) BG John Pegram	Godwin's Brigade (712 officers & men) LtCol William T. Davis (w)	Brigade Staff (9 off & men); 6th North Carolina Infantry (179 officers & men): Ltc Samuel M. Tate; 21st North Carolina Infantry (244 officers & men): Maj William J. Pfohl (k); 54th North Carolina Infantry (126 officers & men): Cpt Augustus H. Martin; 57th North Carolina (154 officers & men): Cpt Miles H. Hunter
Gordon's Division MG John Brown Gordon	Evans' Brigade BG Clement A. Evans	13th Georgia: Col. John H. Baker; 26th Georgia: Ltc James Blain; 31st Georgia: Col John H. Lowe; 38th Georgia: Ltc Philip E. Davant; 60th Georgia: Col Waters B. Jones; 61st Georgia: Capt Eliphalet F. Sharpe; 12th Georgia Battalion:
Gordon's Division MG John Brown Gordon	Hays'/Stafford's Brigades Col William R. Peck	5th, 6th, and 7th Louisiana Consolidated Infantry; 8th Louisiana Infantry; 9th Louisiana Infantry; 10th and 15th Louisiana Consolidated Infantry; 1st and 14th Louisiana Consolidated Infantry; 2nd Louisiana Infantry
Gordon's Division MG John Brown Gordon	Terry's Brigade BG William Terry	Old First Brigade: 2nd, 4th, 5th, 27th, and 33rd Virginia Consolidated Infantry Regiments: Col Abraham Spengler; Jones’ Old Second Brigade: 21st, 25th, 42nd, 44th, 48th, and 50th Virginia Consolidated Infantry Regiments: Col Robert H. Dungan; Steuart’s Old Third Brigade: 10th, 23rd, and 37th Virginia Consolidated Infantry Regiments: Ltc Dorilas H. L. Martz (?)
Kershaw's Division MG Joseph B. Kershaw	Conner's Brigade Maj James M. Goggin	2nd South Carolina: Maj Benjamin R. Clyburn (w); 3rd South Carolina: Maj Rutherford P. Todd (w); 7th South Carolina: Cpt Elijah J. Coggans; 8th South Carolina: Col John W. Henegan; 15th South Carolina: --; 20th South Carolina: Col Stephen M. Boykin (c); Ltc Paul A. McMichaels (c); 3rd South Carolina Battalion: Cpt B. M. Whitener (k)
Kershaw's Division MG Joseph B. Kershaw	Humphreys' Brigade Col Daniel M. Moody (w)	13th Mississippi: Ltc Alfred G. O'Brien; 17th Mississippi: Cpt Jesse C. Cochran; 18th Mississippi: Col Thomas M. Griffin; 21st Mississippi: William H. Fitzgerald
Kershaw's Division MG Joseph B. Kershaw	Wofford's Brigade Col Christopher Columbus Sanders	16th Georgia: Maj James S. Gholston; 18th Georgia: Col Joseph Armstrong; 24th Georgia: Col Christopher C. Sanders; 3rd Georgia Battalion: Ltc Nathan L. Hutchins; Cobb's (Georgia) Legion: Cpt John H. Burr; Phillip's (Georgia) Legion: Ltc William W. Rich
Kershaw's Division MG Joseph B. Kershaw	Bryan's Brigade Col James P. Simms	10th Georgia: Col Willis C. Holt (mw); 50th Georgia: Col Peter A.S. McGlashan (w); 51st Georgia: Col Edward Ball (mw); 53rd Georgia: Col James P. Simms
Wharton's Division (1171 officers & men) BG Gabriel C. Wharton	Wharton's Brigade (417 officers & men) Capt. Robert H. Logan	Brigade Staff (3 off); 45th Virginia Infantry (158 officers & men):--; 51st Virginia Infantry (183 officers & men):--; 30th Virginia Sharpshooters Battalion (73 officers & men):--
Wharton's Division (1171 officers & men) BG Gabriel C. Wharton	Echols' Brigade (286 officers & men) Cpt Edmund S. Read	22nd Virginia Infantry (111 officers & men): Cpt Henry Dickinson; 23rd Virginia Infantry Battalion (83 officers & men): Cpt John M. Pratt; 26th Virginia Infantry Battalion (92 officers & men): Cpt Frank C. Burdett
Wharton's Division (1171 officers & men) BG Gabriel C. Wharton	Smith's Brigade (457 officers & men) Col Thomas Smith	Brigade Staff (6 officers & men); 36th Virginia Infantry (161 officers & men): Lt. Jackson Via; 60th Virginia Infantry (175 officers & men): Cpt Albert G.P. George; 45th Virginia Infantry Battalion (25 officers & men): Cpt William B. Hensley; Thomas's Legion (90 officers & men): Ltc James R. Love, jr.

=== Cavalry ===
Division	Brigade	Regiments and Others
Lomax's Division MG Lunsford L. Lomax	Imboden's Brigade Col George H. Smith	18th Virginia Cavalry: --; 23rd Virginia Cavalry: --; 62nd Virginia Mounted Infantry: --
Lomax's Division MG Lunsford L. Lomax	Bradley T. Johnson's Brigade BG Bradley T. Johnson	8th Virginia Cavalry: --; 21st Virginia Cavalry: --; 22nd Virginia Cavalry: --; 34th Virginia Cavalry Battalion: --; 36th Virginia Cavalry Battalion: --
Lomax's Division MG Lunsford L. Lomax	McCausland's Brigade BG John McCausland	14th Virginia Cavalry: --; 16th Virginia Cavalry: --; 17th Virginia Cavalry: --; 25th Virginia Cavalry: --; 37th Virginia Cavalry Battalion: --
Lomax's Division MG Lunsford L. Lomax	Jackson's Brigade BG Henry B. Davidson	2nd Maryland Cavalry: --; 19th Virginia Cavalry: --; 20th Virginia Cavalry: --; 46th Virginia Cavalry Battalion: --; 47th Virginia Cavalry Battalion: --
Rosser's (Fitz Lee's) Division BG Thomas L. Rosser	Wickham's Brigade Thomas T. Munford	1st Virginia Cavalry: --; 2nd Virginia Cavalry: --; 3rd Virginia Cavalry: --; 4th Virginia Cavalry: --
Rosser's (Fitz Lee's) Division BG Thomas L. Rosser	Payne's Brigade Col William H. F. Payne	5th Virginia Cavalry: --; 6th Virginia Cavalry: --; 15th Virginia Cavalry: --
Rosser's (Fitz Lee's) Division BG Thomas L. Rosser	Rosser's Brigade --	7th Virginia Cavalry: --; 11th Virginia Cavalry: --; 12th Virginia Cavalry: --; 35th Virginia Cavalry Battalion: --

=== Army Artillery ===
Division	Brigade	Regiments and Others
Artillery Col Thomas H. Carter	Braxton's Battalion --	Virginia battery (Carpenter's): --; Virginia battery (Hardwicke's): --; Virginia battery (Cooper's): --
Artillery Col Thomas H. Carter	Cutshaw's Battalion --	Virginia battery, (Carrington's): --; Virginia battery, (Tanner's): --; Virginia battery, (Garber's). --
Artillery Col Thomas H. Carter	Kings Battalion Ltc J. Floyd King	Virginia battery (Bryan's): --; Virginia battery (Chapman's): --; Virginia battery (Lowry's): --
Artillery Col Thomas H. Carter	Carter's Battalion --	Alabama battery (Reese's): --; Virginia battery (W. P. Carter's): --; Virginia battery (Pendleton's): --; Virginia battery (Fry's): --
Artillery Col Thomas H. Carter	Nelson's Battalion Ltc William Nelson	Georgia battery (Milledge's): --; Virginia battery (Kirkpatrick's): --; Snead's (Virginia) Fluvanna Battery (Massie's): --
Artillery Col Thomas H. Carter	Horse Artillery --	Maryland battery (Griffin's): --; Virginia battery (Jackson's): --; Virginia battery (Lurty's): --; Virginia battery (McClanahan's): --; Virginia battery (Johnston's): --; Virginia battery (Shoemaker's): --; Virginia battery (Thomson's): --
