= Battle of Mine Run order of battle: Confederate =

The following Confederate States Army units and commanders fought in the Mine Run campaign (November 27–December 2, 1863) of the American Civil War. The Union order of battle is listed separately. Order of battle compiled from the army organization from October 31, 1863, the casualty returns and the reports.

== Abbreviations used ==
=== Military rank ===
- Gen = General
- LTG = Lieutenant General
- MG = Major General
- BG = Brigadier General
- Col = Colonel
- Ltc = Lieutenant Colonel
- Maj = Major
- Cpt = Captain

=== Other ===
- (w) = wounded
- (mw) = mortally wounded
- (k) = killed in action
- (c) = captured

== Army of Northern Virginia ==
Gen Robert E. Lee

=== Second Corps ===
MG Jubal A. Early

| Division | Brigade | Regiments and others |
|---|---|---|
| Early's Division; BG Harry T. Hays | Pegram's Brigade BG John Pegram | 13th Virginia; 31st Virginia; 49th Virginia; 52nd Virginia; 58th Virginia |
| Early's Division; BG Harry T. Hays | Gordon's Brigade BG John B. Gordon | 13th Georgia: Col James M. Smith; 26th Georgia; 31st Georgia: Col Clement A. Evans; 38th Georgia: Ltc Philip E. Devant; 60th Georgia: Maj Waters B. Jones; 61st Georgia: Col John H. Lamar |
| Early's Division; BG Harry T. Hays | Hays' Brigade Col William Monaghan | 5th Louisiana; 6th Louisiana; 7th Louisiana; 8th Louisiana; 9th Louisiana |
| Early's Division; BG Harry T. Hays | Hoke's Brigade Ltc Samuel M. Tate | 6th North Carolina; 21st North Carolina; 54th North Carolina; 57th North Carolina; 1st Battalion North Carolina Sharpshooters |
| Johnson's Division; MG Edward Johnson | Stonewall Brigade BG James A. Walker | 2nd Virginia: Ltc Raleigh T. Colston (mw), Cpt Charles H. Stewart; 4th Virginia: Maj William Terry (w); 5th Virginia: Col John H. S. Funk; 27th Virginia: Maj Philip F. Frazer; 33rd Virginia: Ltc Abraham Spengler |
| Johnson's Division; MG Edward Johnson | Steuart's Brigade BG George H. Steuart (w) | 1st North Carolina: Ltc Hamilton A. Brown (w), Cpt Louis C. Latham; 3rd North Carolina: Col Stephen D. Thruston; 10th Virginia: Col Edward T. H. Warren; 23rd Virginia: Ltc Simeon T. Walton (k), Maj John P. Fitzgerald; 37th Virginia: Col Titus V. Williams |
| Johnson's Division; MG Edward Johnson | Jones' Brigade BG John M. Jones (w); Col William A. Witcher | 21st Virginia: Col William A. Witcher, Ltc William P. Moseley; 25th Virginia: Col John C. Higginbotham; 42nd Virginia: Ltc Robert W. Withers; 44th Virginia: Col Norvell P. Cobb; 48th Virginia: Col Robert H. Dungan; 50th Virginia: Col Alexander S. Vandeventer |
| Johnson's Division; MG Edward Johnson | Stafford's Brigade BG Leroy A. Stafford | 1st Louisiana: Cpt Edward D. Willett; 2nd Louisiana: Cpt Martin C. Redwine; 10th Louisiana: Ltc Henry D. Monier; 14th Louisiana: Ltc David Zable; 15th Louisiana: Col Edmund Pendleton |
| Rodes' Division; MG Robert E. Rodes | Daniel's Brigade BG Junius Daniel | 32nd North Carolina: Col Edmund C. Brabble; 43rd North Carolina: Ltc William G. Lewis; 45th North Carolina: Maj T. McGehee Smith; 53rd North Carolina: Col William A. Owens; 2nd North Carolina Battalion: Cpt Edward Smith |
| Rodes' Division; MG Robert E. Rodes | Ramseur's Brigade BG Stephen D. Ramseur | 2nd North Carolina; 4th North Carolina; 14th North Carolina; 30th North Carolina |
| Rodes' Division; MG Robert E. Rodes | Doles' Brigade BG George P. Doles | 4th Georgia: Ltc William H. Willis; 12th Georgia: Col Edward S. Willis; 21st Georgia: Col John T. Mercer; 44th Georgia: Col William H. Peebles |
| Rodes' Division; MG Robert E. Rodes | Battle's Brigade BG Cullen A. Battle | 3rd Alabama: Col Charles Forsyth; 5th Alabama: Col Josephus M. Hall; 6th Alabama: Maj Isaac F. Culver; 12th Alabama: Maj Adolph Proskamer; 26th Alabama: Ltc John S. Garvin |
| Rodes' Division; MG Robert E. Rodes | Johnston's Brigade BG Robert D. Johnston | 5th North Carolina; 12th North Carolina; 20th North Carolina: Col Thomas F. Toon; 23rd North Carolina: Ltc William S. Davis |
| Artillery; BG Armistead L. Long | Andrews' Battalion Maj Carter M. Braxton | 1st Maryland Artillery; Chesapeake (Maryland) Artillery; Alleghany (Virginia) Artillery; Lee (Virginia) Battery: Cpt Charles I. Raine (k) |
| Artillery; BG Armistead L. Long | Carter's Battalion Ltc Thomas H. Carter | Jefferson Davis (Alabama) Artillery; King William (Virginia) Artillery; Morris (Virginia) Artillery; Orange (Virginia) Artillery |
| Artillery; BG Armistead L. Long | Jones' Battalion Ltc Hilary P. Jones | Louisiana Guard Battery; Charlottesville (Virginia) Artillery; Courtney (Virginia) Artillery; Staunton (Virginia) Artillery |
| Artillery; BG Armistead L. Long | Nelson's Battalion Ltc William Nelson | Milledge's (Georgia) Battery; Amherst (Virginia) Artillery; Fluvanna (Virginia) Artillery |
| Artillery; BG Armistead L. Long | First Regiment Virginia Artillery Col J. Thompson Brown | 2nd Richmond (Virginia) Howitzers; 3rd Richmond (Virginia) Howitzers; Powhatan (Virginia) Artillery; Rockbridge (Virginia) Artillery; Salem (Virginia) Flying Artillery |

=== Third Corps ===
LTG Ambrose P. Hill

- Provost Guard: 5th Alabama Battalion

| Division | Brigade | Regiments and others |
|---|---|---|
| Anderson's Division; MG Richard H. Anderson | Wilcox's (old) Brigade Col John C. C. Sanders | 8th Alabama; 9th Alabama; 10th Alabama; 11th Alabama; 14th Alabama |
| Anderson's Division; MG Richard H. Anderson | Posey's Brigade Col Nathaniel H. Harris | 12th Mississippi; 16th Mississippi; 19th Mississippi; 48th Mississippi |
| Anderson's Division; MG Richard H. Anderson | Mahone's Brigade BG William Mahone | 6th Virginia; 12th Virginia; 16th Virginia; 41st Virginia; 61st Virginia |
| Anderson's Division; MG Richard H. Anderson | Wright' s Brigade BG Ambrose R. Wright | 3rd Georgia; 22nd Georgia; 48th Georgia; 2nd Georgia Battalion |
| Anderson's Division; MG Richard H. Anderson | Perry's Brigade BG Edward A. Perry | 2nd Florida; 5th Florida; 8th Florida |
| Heth's Division; MG Henry Heth | Davis' Brigade BG Joseph R. Davis | 2nd Mississippi; 11th Mississippi; 42nd Mississippi; 55th North Carolina |
| Heth's Division; MG Henry Heth | Archer's and Walker's Brigade BG Henry H. Walker | Archer's Brigade: 13th Alabama; 1st Tennessee (Provisional Army); 7th Tennessee; 14th Tennessee; Walker's Brigade: 40th Virginia; 47th Virginia; 55th Virginia; 22nd Virginia Battalion |
| Heth's Division; MG Henry Heth | Kirkland's Brigade Col Thomas C. Singletary | 11th North Carolina; 26th North Carolina; 44th North Carolina; 47th North Carolina; 52nd North Carolina |
| Heth's Division; MG Henry Heth | Cooke's Brigade Col Edward D. Hall | 15th North Carolina; 27th North Carolina; 46th North Carolina; 48th North Carolina |
| Wilcox's Division; MG Cadmus M. Wilcox | Lane's Brigade BG James H. Lane | 7th North Carolina; 18th North Carolina; 28th North Carolina; 33rd North Carolina; 37th North Carolina |
| Wilcox's Division; MG Cadmus M. Wilcox | McGowan' s Brigade BG Abner M. Perrin | 1st South Carolina (Provisional Army); 1st South Carolina (Orr's Rifles); 12th South Carolina; 13th South Carolina; 14th South Carolina |
| Wilcox's Division; MG Cadmus M. Wilcox | Thomas' Brigade BG Edward L. Thomas | 14th Georgia; 35th Georgia; 45th Georgia; 49th Georgia |
| Wilcox's Division; MG Cadmus M. Wilcox | Scales' Brigade BG Alfred M. Scales | 13th North Carolina; 16th North Carolina; 22nd North Carolina; 34th North Carolina; 38th North Carolina |
| Artillery; Col R. Lindsay Walker | Cutts' Battalion Ltc Allen S. Cutts | Irwin (Georgia) Artillery; Patterson's (Georgia) Artillery; Ross' (Georgia) Artillery |
| Artillery; Col R. Lindsay Walker | McIntosh's Battalion Maj David G. McIntosh | Hardaway (Alabama) Battery; Danville (Virginia) Artillery; Johnson's (Virginia) Battery; 2nd Rockbridge (Virginia) Artillery |
| Artillery; Col R. Lindsay Walker | Poague's Battalion Ltc William T. Poague | Madison (Mississippi) Artillery; Graham's (North Carolina) Battery; Albemarle (Virginia) Artillery; Brooke's (Virginia) Battery |
| Artillery; Col R. Lindsay Walker | Garnett's Battalion Ltc John J. Garnett | Donaldsonville Louisiana Artillery; Huger (Virginia) Artillery; Lewis (Virginia) Artillery; Norfolk (Virginia) Light Artillery |
| Artillery; Col R. Lindsay Walker | Pegram's Battalion Maj William R. J. Pegram | Pee Dee (South Carolina) Artillery; Crenshaw (Virginia) Battery; Fredericksburg (Virginia) Artillery; Letcher (Virginia) Artillery; Purcell (Virginia) Battery |
| Artillery; Col R. Lindsay Walker | Haskell's Battalion Maj John C. Haskell | Branch (North Carolina) Artillery; Rowan (North Carolina) Artillery; Palmetto (South Carolina) Artillery |

=== Cavalry Corps ===
MG J.E.B. Stuart

| Division | Brigade | Regiments and others |
|---|---|---|
| Hampton's Division; MG Wade Hampton | Gordon's Brigade BG James B. Gordon | 1st North Carolina; 2nd North Carolina; 4th North Carolina; 5th North Carolina |
| Hampton's Division; MG Wade Hampton | Young's Brigade BG Pierce M. B. Young | 1st South Carolina Cavalry; 2nd South Carolina Cavalry; Cobb's (Georgia) Legion; Phillips (Georgia) Legion; Jeff Davis (Mississippi) Legion: Ltc Joseph F. Waring |
| Hampton's Division; MG Wade Hampton | Rosser's Brigade BG Thomas L. Rosser | 7th Virginia; 11th Virginia; 12th Virginia: Ltc Thomas B. Massie; 35th Virginia Battalion |
| Fitzhugh Lee's Division; MG Fitzhugh Lee | William H. F. Lee's Brigade Col John R. Chambliss, Jr. | 9th Virginia; 10th Virginia; 13th Virginia |
| Fitzhugh Lee's Division; MG Fitzhugh Lee | Lomax's Brigade BG Lunsford L. Lomax | 5th Virginia; 6th Virginia; 15th Virginia |
| Fitzhugh Lee's Division; MG Fitzhugh Lee | Wickham's Brigade BG Williams C. Wickham | 1st Virginia; 2nd Virginia; 3rd Virginia; 4th Virginia |
| Horse Artillery | Beckham's Battalion Maj Robert F. Beckham | Breathed's (Virginia) Battery; Hart's (South Carolina) Battery; Chew's (Virginia) Battery; McGregor's (Virginia) Battery; Moorman's (Virginia) Battery |

=== Reserve artillery ===
BG William N. Pendleton

| Division | Battalions | Batteries |
|---|---|---|
| First Corps Artillery | Cabell's Battalion Col Henry C. Cabell | Callaway's (Georgia) Battery; Troup (Georgia) Artillery; Manly's (North Carolina) Battery; 1st Richmond (Virginia) Howitzers; Nelson (Virginia) Artillery |
