= Second Battle of Winchester order of battle: Confederate =

American Civil War battle

The following Confederate States Army units and commanders fought in the Second Battle of Winchester. The Union order of battle is listed separately.

== Military rank abbreviations ==
- LTG = Lieutenant General
- MG = Major General
- BG = Brigadier General
- Col = Colonel
- Ltc = Lieutenant Colonel
- Maj = Major
- Cpt = Captain

== Confederate army ==
Second Corps, Army of Northern Virginia (22651 officers & men)
LTG Richard S. Ewell

Division	Brigade	Regiments and Others
Early's Division (6350 officers & men); MG Jubal Anderson Early	Hays' Brigade (1272 officers & men) BG Harry T. Hays	5th Louisiana (205 officers & men): Maj Alexander Hart; 6th Louisiana (255 officers & men): Col William Monaghan, Ltc Joseph Hanlon; 7th Louisiana (255 officers & men): Col Davidson B. Penn; 8th Louisiana (296 officers & men): Col Trevanion D. Lewis; 9th Louisiana (260 officers & men): Col Leroy Augustus Stafford
Early's Division (6350 officers & men); MG Jubal Anderson Early	Hoke's Brigade (1750 officers & men) Col Isaac E. Avery	6th North Carolina (515 officers & men): Maj Samuel McD. Tate; 21st North Carolina (445 officers & men): Col William Whedbee Kirkland; 54th North Carolina (408 officers & men): Col Kenneth M. Murchison; 57th North Carolina (305 officers & men): Col Archibald C. Godwin; 1st North Carolina Battalion (77 officers & men): Maj Rufus W. Wharton
Early's Division (6350 officers & men); MG Jubal Anderson Early	Smith's Brigade (1180 officers & men) BG William "Extra Billy" Smith	13th Virginia Infantry (102 officers & men): Col James B. Terrill; 31st Virginia Infantry (270 officers & men): Col John S. Hoffman; 49th Virginia Infantry (281 officers & men): Ltc J. Catlett Gibson; 52nd Virginia Infantry (255 officers & men): Ltc James H. Skinner; 58th Virginia Infantry (272 officers & men): Col Francis H. Board
Early's Division (6350 officers & men); MG Jubal Anderson Early	Gordon's Brigade (1850 officers & men) BG John Brown Gordon	13th Georgia (322 officers & men): Col James Milton Smith; 26th Georgia (320 officers & men): Col Edward N. Atkinson; 31st Georgia (260 officers & men): Col Clement A. Evans; 38th Georgia (350 officers & men): Cpt William L. McLeod; 60th Georgia (305 officers & men): Cpt Waters B. Jones; 61st Georgia (293 officers & men): Col John H. Lamar
Early's Division (6350 officers & men); MG Jubal Anderson Early	Artillery Battalion (298 officers & men) Ltc Hilary P. Jones	Charlottesville Virginia Battery (75 officers & men; 4x 12-pounder Napoleons): Cpt James McD. Carrington; Courtney Virginia Battery (95 officers & men; 4x 3-inch Ordnance Rifles): Cpt William A. Tanner; Staunton Virginia Battery (64 officers & men; 4x 12-pounder Napoleons): Cpt Asher W. Garber; Louisiana Guard Battery (64 officers & men; 2x 3-inch Ordnance rifles; 2x 10-pounder Parrott Rifles): Cpt Charles Thompson, Lt Charles A. Green
Johnson's Division (6473 officers & men); MG Edward "Allegheny" Johnson	Steuart's Third Brigade (2178 officers & men) BG George H. Steuart	1st North Carolina (396 officers & men): Ltc Hamilton A. Brown; 3rd North Carolina (585 officers & men): Maj William M. Parsley; 10th Virginia Infantry (282 officers & men): Col E. T. H. Warren; 23rd Virginia Infantry (251 officers & men): Ltc Simeon T. Walton; 37th Virginia Infantry (264 officers & men): Maj Henry C. Wood
Johnson's Division (6473 officers & men); MG Edward "Allegheny" Johnson	Nicholl's "Pelican" Brigade (1038 officers & men) Col Jesse M. Williams	1st Louisiana (172 officers & men): Cpt Edward D. Willett; 2nd Louisiana (236 officers & men): Ltc Ross E. Burke; 10th Louisiana (226 officers & men): Maj Thomas N. Powell; 14th Louisiana (218 officers & men): Ltc David Zable; 15th Louisiana (186 officers & men): Maj Andrew Brady
Johnson's Division (6473 officers & men); MG Edward "Allegheny" Johnson	Stonewall Brigade (1346 officers & men) BG James A. Walker	2nd Virginia Infantry (335 officers & men): Col John Q. A. Nadenbousch; 4th Virginia Infantry (257 officers & men): Maj William Terry; 5th Virginia Infantry (370 officers & men): Col John H. S. Funk; 27th Virginia Infantry (148 officers & men): Ltc David M. Shriver; 33rd Virginia Infantry (236 officers & men): Cpt Jacob B. Golladay
Johnson's Division (6473 officers & men); MG Edward "Allegheny" Johnson	Jones' Second Brigade (1446 officers & men) BG John M. Jones	21st Virginia Infantry (183 officers & men): Cpt William P. Mosley; 25th Virginia Infantry (280 officers & men): Col John C. Higginbotham; 42nd Virginia Infantry (252 officers & men): Ltc Robert W. Withers; 44th Virginia Infantry (227 officers & men): Ltc Robert M. Dungan; 48th Virginia Infantry (252 officers & men): Ltc R. H. Dungan; 50th Virginia Infantry (252 officers & men): Ltc Logan H. N. Solyer
Johnson's Division (6473 officers & men); MG Edward "Allegheny" Johnson	Artillery Battalion (380 officers & men) Ltc R. Snowden Andrews (W); Maj Joseph W. Latimer	1st Battery, Maryland Artillery (105 officers & men; 4x 12-pounder Napoleons): Cpt William F. Dement; Chesapeake (Maryland) Artillery (81 officers & men; 4x 10-pounder Parrott Rifles): Cpt William D. Brown; Allegheny (Virginia) Artillery (99 officers & men; 2x 12-pounder Napoleons; 2x 3-inch Ordnance Rifles): Cpt John C. Carpenter; Lee (Virginia) Battery (95 officers & men; 1x 3-inch Ordnance Rifles; 1x 10-pounder Parrott Rifles; 2x 20-pounder Parrott Rifles): Cpt C. I. Raine
Rodes's Division (7952 officers & men); MG Robert E. Rodes	Daniel's Brigade (2157 officers & men) BG Junius Daniel	32nd North Carolina (465 officers & men): Col Edmund C. Brabble; 43rd North Carolina (583 officers & men): Col Thomas S. Kenan; 45th North Carolina (460 officers & men): Ltc Samuel H. Boyd; 53rd North Carolina (409 officers & men): Col William A. Owens; 2nd North Carolina Battalion (240 officers & men): Ltc Hezekiah L. Andrews
Rodes's Division (7952 officers & men); MG Robert E. Rodes	Iverson's Brigade (1380 officers & men) BG Alfred Iverson, Jr.	5th North Carolina (473 officers & men): Cpt Speight B. West; 12th North Carolina (219 officers & men): Ltc William S. Davis; 20th North Carolina (372 officers & men): Ltc Nelson Slough; 23rd North Carolina (316 officers & men): Col Daniel H. Christie
Rodes's Division (7952 officers & men); MG Robert E. Rodes	Doles's Brigade (1329 officers & men) BG George P. Doles	4th Georgia (341 officers & men): Ltc D. R. E. Winn; 12th Georgia (327 officers & men): Col Edward Willis; 21st Georgia (287 officers & men): Col John T. Mercer; 44th Georgia (364 officers & men): Col Samuel P. Lumpkin
Rodes's Division (7952 officers & men); MG Robert E. Rodes	Ramseur's Brigade (1023 officers & men) BG Stephen Dodson Ramseur	2nd North Carolina (243 officers & men): Maj Daniel W. Hurtt; 4th North Carolina (196 officers & men): Col Bryan Grimes; 14th North Carolina (308 officers & men): Col Tyler Bennett; 30th North Carolina (276 officers & men): Col Francis M. Parker
Rodes's Division (7952 officers & men); MG Robert E. Rodes	O'Neal's Brigade (1685 officers & men) Col Edward A. O'Neal	3rd Alabama (350 officers & men): Col Cullen A. Battle; 5th Alabama (317 officers & men): Col Josephus M. Hall; 6th Alabama (382 officers & men): Col James N. Lightfoot; 12th Alabama (317 officers & men): Col Samuel B. Pickens; 26th Alabama (319 officers & men): Ltc John C. Goodgame
Rodes's Division (7952 officers & men); MG Robert E. Rodes	Artillery Battalion (378 officers & men) Ltc Thomas H. Carter	Jeff Davis (Alabama) Artillery (79 officers & men; 4x 3-inch Ordnance Rifles): Cpt William J. Reese; King William (Virginia) Artillery (103 officers & men; 2x 10-pounder Parrott Rifles; 2x 12-pounder Napoleons): Cpt William P. Carter; Morris (Virginia) Artillery (114 officers & men; 4x 12-pounder Napoleons): Cpt Richard C. M. Page; Orange (Virginia) Artillery (82 officers & men; 2x 3-inch Ordnance Rifles; 2x 10-pounder Parrott Rifles): Cpt Charles W. Fry
Unattached		1st Maryland Infantry Battalion (400 officers & men) (17 total casualties): Ltc James R. Herbert; 2nd Baltimore (Maryland) Light Artillery (106 officers & men; 4x 10-pounder Parrott Rifles): Capt Wiley H. Griffin; Company A, 1st Maryland Cavalry (~50 officers & men): Capt. Frank A. Bond; Company B, 1st Maryland Cavalry (~50 officers & men): Capt George M. Emack
Cavalry	Jenkins's Cavalry Brigade (1185 officers & men) BG Albert G. Jenkins	34th Virginia Cavalry (172 officers & men): Ltc Vincent A. Witcher; 14th Virginia Cavalry (268 officers & men): Col James A. Cochran; 16th Virginia Cavalry (265 officers & men): Col Milton J. Ferguson Maj James H. Nounnan; 17th Virginia Cavalry (242 officers & men): Col William H. French; 36th Virginia Cavalry Battalion (125 officers & men): Maj James W. Sweeney (w); Capt Cornelius T. Smith; Charlottesville (Virginia) Horse Battery (113 officers & men; 2x 3-inch Rifles; 2x 12-pounder Howitzers): Cpt Thomas E. Jackson
Artillery Reserve (85 officers & men)	Crutchfield's Artillery Col J. Thompson Brown	
Artillery Reserve (85 officers & men)	Nelson's Battalion Ltc William Nelson	Five batteries of 1st Virginia Artillery
