= Battle of Spotsylvania Court House order of battle =

The order of battle for the Battle of Spotsylvania Court House includes:

- Battle of Spotsylvania Court House order of battle: Confederate
- Battle of Spotsylvania Court House order of battle: Union
