= Battle of New Hope Church order of battle =

Battle of New Hope Church order of battle may refer to:

- Battle of Mine Run order of battle, for the 1863 battle in Virginia also known as Battle of New Hope Church
- Atlanta campaign order of battle, for the 1864 Battle of New Hope Church in Georgia, during the Atlanta campaign
