= Battle of Mine Run order of battle =

The order of battle for the Battle of Mine Run (also known as Payne's Farm or New Hope Church) or the Mine Run campaign includes:

- Battle of Mine Run order of battle: Confederate
- Battle of Mine Run order of battle: Union
