= List of Confederate units from Georgia in the American Civil War =

Unofficial state flag of Georgia used during the Civil War.

This is a list of Georgia Civil War Confederate Units which fought for the Confederacy in the American Civil War, including State Guards, State Line, Militia, and Reserve forces that were under local control.

== Confederate army ==
=== Infantry ===
- 1st Confederate Infantry (formerly 36th Infantry)
- 1st (Olmstead's/Mercer's) Infantry
- 1st (Ramsey's) Infantry
- 1st (Regular) Infantry
- 2nd Infantry
- 3rd Infantry
- 4th Infantry
- 5th Infantry
- 6th Infantry
- 7th Infantry
- 8th Infantry
- 9th Infantry
- 10th Infantry
- 11th Infantry
- 12th Infantry
- 13th Infantry
- 14th Infantry
- 15th Infantry
- 16th Infantry
- 17th Infantry
- 18th Infantry
- 19th Infantry
- 20th Infantry
- 21st Infantry
- 22nd Infantry
- 23rd Infantry
- 24th Infantry
- 25th Infantry

- 26th Infantry
- 27th Infantry
- 28th Infantry
- 29th Infantry
- 30th Infantry
- 31st Infantry
- 32nd Infantry
- 34th Infantry
- 35th Infantry
- 36th Infantry (Broyles')
- 36th Infantry (Villepigue's, see 1st Confederate)
- 37th Infantry
- 38th Infantry
- 39th Infantry
- 40th Infantry
- 41st Infantry
- 42nd Infantry
- 43rd Infantry
- 44th Infantry
- 45th Infantry
- 46th Infantry
- 47th Infantry
- 48th Infantry
- 49th Infantry
- 50th Infantry
- 51st Infantry
- 52nd Infantry
- 53rd Infantry

- 54th Infantry
- 55th Infantry
- 56th Infantry
- 57th Infantry
- 59th Infantry
- 60th Infantry
- 61st Infantry
- 62nd Infantry
- 63d Infantry
- 64th Infantry
- 65th Infantry
- 66th Infantry
- 1st Battalion, Infantry (see 36th Regiment, Villepigue's)
- 2nd Battalion, Infantry
- 3rd Battalion, Infantry (see 37th Regiment)
- 4th Battalion, Infantry (Mercer's, see 21st Regiment)
- 4th Battalion, Infantry (Stiles', see 60th Regiment)
- 7th Battalion, Infantry (see 61st Regiment)
- 8th Battalion, Infantry
- 9th Battalion, Infantry (also 17th)
- 10th Battalion, Infantry (also 3rd)
- 11th Battalion, Infantry
- 13th Battalion, Infantry (see 63rd Regiment)
- 18th Battalion, Infantry
- 26th Battalion, Infantry
- 27th Battalion, Infantry
- 40th Battalion, Infantry

=== Sharpshooters ===
- 1st Battalion, Sharpshooters
- 2nd Battalion, Sharpshooters
- 3rd Battalion, Sharpshooters
- 4th Battalion, Sharpshooters

=== Cavalry ===
- 1st Cavalry
- 2nd Cavalry
- 3rd Cavalry
- 4th Cavalry (Avery's)
- 4th Cavalry (Clinch's)
- 5th Cavalry
  - Georgia Hussars (Company A)
- 6th Cavalry
- 7th Cavalry
- 8th Cavalry
- 9th Cavalry
- 10th Cavalry
- 11th Cavalry
- 12th Cavalry

- 13th Cavalry
- 29th Cavalry
- 62nd Cavalry
- 1st Battalion, Cavalry
- 2nd Battalion, Cavalry (see 5th Regiment)
- 3rd Battalion, Cavalry (see Clinch's 4th Regiment)
- 16th Battalion, Cavalry (see 13th Regiment)
- 19th Battalion, Cavalry (see 10th Confederate Regiment)
- 21st Battalion, Cavalry (see 7th Regiment)
- 23rd Battalion, Cavalry (see Avery's 4th Regiment)
- 24th Battalion, Cavalry (see 7th Regiment)
- 25th Battalion, Cavalry
- 29th Battalion, Cavalry
- 30th Battalion, Cavalry (see 11th Regiment)

=== Partisan rangers ===
- 2nd Regiment, Partisan Rangers
- 62nd Regiment, Partisan Rangers
- 15th Battalion, Partisan Rangers
- 20th Battalion, Partisan Rangers

=== Legions ===
- 1st Georgia Legion
  - Infantry Battalion
  - Cavalry Regiment (6th Cavalry)
- Cobb's Legion
  - Infantry Battalion
  - Cavalry Regiment (9th Cavalry)
  - Carlton's Battery (Troup Artillery)
- Cherokee Legion (State Guards)
- Floyd's Legion (State Guards)
  - Infantry (State Guards)
  - Cavalry (State Guards)
  - Forrest Artillery (State Guards)
- Phillips' Legion
  - Infantry Battalion
    - Blue Ridge Rifles (Company E)
  - Cavalry Battalion
- Smith's Legion
- Wright's Legion

=== Artillery ===
- 1st Artillery
- 2nd Battery
- 9th Artillery Battalion
- 11th Artillery Battalion (Sumter Artillery)
- 12th Light Artillery Battalion
- 14th (Montgomery's) Battalion, Light Artillery
- 22nd Battalion, Heavy Artillery
- 28th Battalion, Siege Artillery
- Anderson's Battalion, Light Artillery
- Maxwell's Battalion, Regular Light Artillery

- Barnwell's Battery, Light Artillery
- Bartow Artillery
- Blodgett's Flying Artillery
- Chatham Artillery (Wheaton's Artillery)
- Chatham Siege Artillery
- Chestatee Artillery
- Clinch's Battery, Light Artillery
- Columbus Artillery (Croft's)
- Daniell's Battery, Light Artillery
- Ferrell's Battery, Light Artillery

- Fraser's Battery, Light Artillery (Pulaski Artillery)
- Griffin Light Artillery
- Guerard's Battery, Light Artillery
- Havis' Battery, Light Artillery
- Hurt Light Artillery
- King's Battery, Light Artillery
- Massenburg's Battery, Light Artillery (Jackson Artillery)
- Moore's Battery, Artillery
- Scogin's Battery, Light Artillery (Griffin Light Artillery)
- Siege Train (Major Buist) Artillery

== Local organizations ==
During the course of the war various local Georgia organizations were created: white men age 16-60 were subject to militia service, the State Troops were organized from September 1861 to May 1862 for local defense, the State Guards served a similar purpose from August 1863 to February 1864, the State Line was assigned to guard the railroads, and the reserves were made up underage boys and men aged 50-60. These local Georgia units became subject to Confederate conscription as the scope of the conscription laws was widened, and Governor Joe Brown clashed frequently with the Richmond government as to whether the state or national authorities should have priority over Georgia's manpower. Many of the local organizations were later turned over to Confederate service.

=== State Guards ===
- 1st Infantry (State Guards)
- 5th Infantry (State Guards)
- 6th Infantry (State Guards)
- 7th Infantry (State Guards)
- 8th Infantry (State Guards)
- 9th Infantry (State Guards)
- 10th Infantry (State Guards)
- 11th Infantry (State Guards)
- 1st Battalion, Infantry (State Guards)
- 2nd Battalion, Infantry (Atlanta Arsenal, State Guards)
- 3rd Battalion (Atlanta Fire Battalion, State Guards)
- 4th Battalion, Infantry (State Guards)
- 5th Battalion, Infantry (State Guards)
- 11th Battalion, Infantry (State Guards)
- 13th Battalion, Infantry (State Guards)
- 14th Battalion, Infantry (State Guards)
- 17th Battalion, Infantry (State Guards)
- 18th Battalion, Infantry (State Guards)
- 19th Battalion, Infantry (State Guards)
- 20th Battalion, Infantry (State Guards)
- 21st Battalion, Infantry (State Guards)
- 22nd Battalion, Infantry (State Guards)
- 23rd Battalion, Infantry (State Guards)
- 2nd Cavalry (State Guards)
- 3rd Cavalry (State Guards)
- 4th Cavalry (State Guards)
- 10th Cavalry (State Guards)
- 11th Cavalry (State Guards)
- 12th (Robinson's) Cavalry (State Guards)
- 12th (Wright's) Cavalry (State Guards)
- 2nd Battalion, Cavalry (State Guards)
- 6th Battalion, Cavalry (State Guards)
- 7th Battalion, Cavalry (State Guards)
- 8th Battalion, Cavalry (State Guards)
- 9th Battalion, Cavalry (State Guards)
- 10th Battalion, Cavalry (State Guards)
- 12th Battalion, Cavalry (State Guards)
- 15th Battalion, Cavalry (State Guards)
- 16th Battalion, Cavalry (State Guards)
- 22d Battalion, Cavalry (State Guards)
- 1st Gordon Squadron, Cavalry (State Guards)
- 10th Battalion, Mounted Rifles (State Guards)

=== State Troops ===
- 1st Regiment (State Troops)
- 2nd Regiment (State Troops) (Storey's)
- 2nd Regiment (State Troops) (Stapleton's)
- 3rd Regiment (State Troops)
- 4th Regiment (State Troops)
- 5th Regiment (State Troops)
- 6th Regiment (State Troops)
- 7th Regiment (State Troops)
- 8th Regiment (State Troops)
- 9th Regiment (State Troops)
- 10th Regiment (State Troops)
- 11th Regiment (State Troops)
- Baker's Battery, Artillery
- Fay's Battery (Etowah Iron Works Artillery)
- Georgia Light Artillery
- Pruden's Battery, Artillery

=== Reserves ===
- 1st Reserves (Fannin's)
- 1st Reserves (Symons')
- 1st Battalion Reserves, Cavalry
- 1st Battalion Reserves, Infantry
- 2nd Reserves
- 3rd Reserves
- 4th Reserves
- 5th Reserves
- 6th Reserves
- Cook's Battalion, Reserves

=== Miscellaneous units ===
- 1st Augusta Battalion, Infantry
- 1st City Battalion (Columbus), Infantry
- 1st Light Duty Men
- 1st Local Defense Troops, Augusta
- 1st Local Defense Troops, Macon
- 2nd Battalion, Local Defense Troops (Macon)
- 23rd Battalion, Local Defense Troops (Athens Battalion, Enfield Rifle Battalion)
- Whiteside's Naval Battalion, Local Defense Troops
- 1st Militia
- 2nd Militia
- 6th Militia
- 8th Militia
- 12th Militia
- 1st Battalion Cavalry, Militia
- 1st State Line
- 2nd State Line
- Arsenal Battalion (Columbus)
- Augusta Arsenal Battalion
- Bradshaw's Cavalry Battalion
- Camden County Militia, Mounted
- City Battalion (Columbus)
- Coast Guard Battalion, Militia
- Cobb's Guards
- Cook's Battalion
- Hardwick Mounted Rifles
- Howard's Battalion, Infantry
- Nancy Harts Rifles
- Ordnance Battalion, Columbus
- Roswell Battalion, Cavalry
- Youngblood's Battalion, Government Mechanics, Columbus

== See also ==
- List of American Civil War units by state
- 1st Georgia Infantry Battalion (Union) - the state's only Union battalion.
