= 1st Louisiana Infantry Regiment (Confederate) =

Infantry regiment of the Confederate States Army

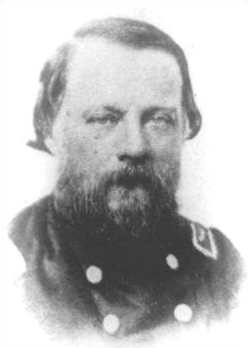
- Albert G. Blanchard was the regiment's first colonel
- Active: 28 April 1861 – 9 April 1865
- Country: Confederate States of America
- Allegiance: Confederate States of America, Louisiana
- Branch: Confederate States Army
- Type: Infantry
- Size: Regiment
- Part of: 2nd Louisiana Brigade (Starke's, Nicholls', Stafford's)
- Engagements: American Civil War; Battle of Oak Grove (1862); Battle of Malvern Hill (1862); Second Battle of Bull Run (1862); Battle of Antietam (1862); Battle of Fredericksburg (1862); Battle of Chancellorsville (1863); Second Battle of Winchester (1863); Battle of Gettysburg (1863); Battle of Mine Run (1863); Battle of the Wilderness (1864); Battle of Spotsylvania (1864); Battle of Monocacy (1864); Third Battle of Winchester (1864); Battle of Fisher's Hill (1864); Battle of Cedar Creek (1864); Siege of Petersburg (1864–65); Battle of Appomattox (1865)

Commanders
- Notable commanders: Albert G. Blanchard

The 1st Louisiana Infantry Regiment was a unit of volunteers recruited in Louisiana that fought in the Confederate States Army during the American Civil War. Formed in April 1861, the regiment was sent to fight in the Eastern Theater of the American Civil War. Joining a brigade of Louisiana regiments, it fought at Malvern Hill, Second Bull Run, Antietam, and Fredericksburg in 1862, at Chancellorsville, Second Winchester, Gettysburg, and Mine Run in 1863, and at the Wilderness, Spotsylvania, Monocacy, Third Winchester, Fisher's Hill, Cedar Creek, and Petersburg in 1864, and at Appomattox in 1865. At Appomattox, the regiment was only a shadow of its former self.

== Formation ==
The 1st Louisiana Infantry Regiment organized at New Orleans on 28 April 1861. The original field officers were Colonel Albert G. Blanchard, Lieutenant Colonel William G. Vincent, and Major William R. Shivers. Blanchard was promoted brigadier general on 21 September 1861 and was replaced as colonel by Vincent on the same date. Shivers became lieutenant colonel on 27 September 1861 and was replaced as major by Samuel R. Harrison. On 28 April 1862, the regiment elected new officers. Vincent was dropped and Harrison became colonel. Harrison resigned on 8 June 1862 and was replaced by Shivers. Michael Nolan became lieutenant colonel and James Nelligan became major. Nolan was killed on 3 July 1863 and replaced by Nelligan. Charles E. Cormier became major. When Shivers resigned at some time in 1864, Nelligan became colonel.

During the course of the war, about 960 men were enrolled in the regiment. There were 10 companies named A–K, excluding J. The original Company B led by Captain Camille E. Girardey was detached as artillery on 5 July 1861 and replaced by a new Company B. The artillery unit became known as the Louisiana Guard Battery. The original Company C led by Captain Francis Rawle transferred to the 1st Louisiana Infantry Battalion on 16 July 1861 and was replaced by a new Company C. The original Company H led by Captain Ben M. Anderson transferred to the 1st Kentucky Infantry Regiment and was replaced by a new Company H on 6 March 1862. The second Company H led by Captain Andrew Brady transferred to the 15th Louisiana Infantry Regiment on 22 May 1862 and was replaced by a third Company H on 27 June 1862.

Company information for the 1st Louisiana Infantry Regiment
Company	Nickname	Captains	Recruitment Parish
A	Caddo Rifles	Charles Dailee (x); Alex Boarman	Caddo
B	Red River Rebels	James C. Wise (x); J. P. Groves (m-Monocacy)	Rapides
C	Slocumb Rifles	Robert W. Armistead (d); James E. Armorer	Orleans
D	Emmet Guards	James Nelligan (p); Albert N. Cummings	Orleans
E	Montgomery Guards	Michael Nolan (p); Michael B. Gillmore (k-Oak Grove); Thomas Rice	Orleans
F	Orleans Light Guards, Co. D	P. R. O'Rorke (x); Samuel H. Snowden (p); James Dillon (r)	Orleans
G	Orleans Light Guards, Co. B	Thomas M. Deane (x); Edward D. Willett	Orleans
H	Shreveport Greys	William E. Moore	Caddo
I	Orleans Light Guards, Co. A	Charles E. Cormier (p); Joseph Taylor	Orleans
K	Orleans Light Guards, Co. C	Charles Frost (r); William L. Randall (r); Louis W. McLaughlin	Orleans

- Key: d = died, k = killed, m = mortally wounded, p = promoted, r = resigned, x = dropped on 28 April 1862.

== Service ==
=== 1861–1862 ===
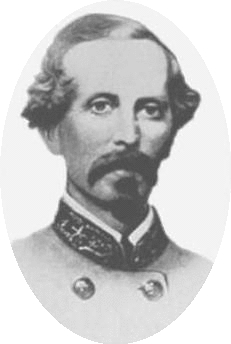
William E. Starke

In 1861, the 1st Louisiana Infantry traveled to Richmond, Virginia. From there the unit moved to Norfolk, Virginia, until early 1862 when it went to North Carolina. In late May, the regiment left Weldon, North Carolina, and returned to Richmond. In the Seven Days Battles the 1st Louisiana Infantry was part of Brigadier General Ambrose R. Wright's brigade and Major General Benjamin Huger's division. On 25 June 1862, the unit fought at the Battle of Oak Grove (King's Schoolhouse). It lost 135 of the 355 men taken into action that day, the most casualties of any unit on the field. On 1 July at the Battle of Malvern Hill, Wright's brigade charged but met intense rifle and artillery fire and was unable to get closer than 300 yd (274 m) from the Union line. Between Oak Grove and Malvern Hill, the regiment lost 214 killed, wounded, or missing.

On 26 July 1862, the 1st Louisiana Infantry was transferred to the 2nd Louisiana Brigade, together with the 1st Louisiana Zouave Battalion and the 2nd Louisiana, 9th Louisiana, 10th Louisiana, and 15th Louisiana Infantry Regiments. The 2nd Louisiana Brigade, led by Colonel Leroy Augustus Stafford arrived after the major fighting ended in the Battle of Cedar Mountain on 9 August. The brigade sustained losses of 4 killed and 20 wounded from artillery and skirmisher fire that evening. In the Second Battle of Bull Run on 28–30 August 1862, the brigade was led by Brigadier General William E. Starke and was part of a division commanded by Brigadier General William B. Taliaferro. Since Taliaferro was wounded on 28 August, Starke assumed command of the division. Colonel Stafford of the 9th Louisiana took charge of the brigade, which sustained losses of 110 killed, 269 wounded, and 6 missing during the fighting. On 30 August, the 2nd Louisiana Brigade successfully defended the unfinished railroad embankment against the attacks of the Union V Corps. The brigade engaged in a furious struggle with Federal soldiers that reached as far as the opposite side of the embankment, only 15 yd (14 m) away. When ammunition ran low, some Louisianans began throwing rocks at their adversaries.

Company H of the 1st Louisiana Infantry was disbanded on 5 September 1862. Starke's brigade went into the Battle of Antietam on 17 September 1862 with about 650 men and suffered losses of 70 killed and 204 wounded. The 1st Louisiana Infantry lost 14 killed and 49 wounded. At about 7 am, Starke's and another brigade charged toward Miller's Corn Field. Immediately, Starke was hit by four bullets and killed. The charge was stopped by intense Federal rifle and artillery fire. In the Battle of Fredericksburg on 13 December 1862, the regiment sustained losses of only a few men wounded. After Fredericksburg, the 1st Zouave Battalion was permanently detached from the brigade.

=== 1863–1865 ===
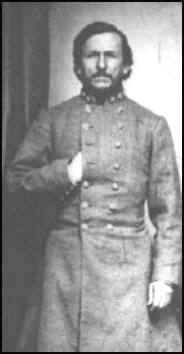
Leroy A. Stafford

Brigadier General Francis T. Nicholls led the brigade at the Battle of Chancellorsville on 1–3 May 1863. It was part of Brigadier General Raleigh Colston's division. The brigade suffered losses of 46 killed, 268 wounded, and 130 missing during the fighting. The 1st Louisiana Infantry lost 7 killed, 29 wounded, and 10 missing. The regiment participated in Lieutenant General Thomas J. Jackson's flank attack on 2 May and in the fighting on 3 May. Nicholls had his left foot taken off by an artillery projectile on 2 May. He was replaced in command of the brigade by Colonel Jesse M. Williams. In the vicious fighting on 3 May, the 1st Louisiana Infantry lost its flag.

On 15 June at the Second Battle of Winchester, the regiment had only 1 man wounded. At the Battle of Gettysburg, the 1st Louisiana Infantry fought at Culp's Hill on 2–3 July 1863, taking 172 men into action and suffering 39 casualties. Nolan led the regiment and was killed. The regiment was in a brigade commanded by Williams, in a division led by Major General Edward Johnson, and in the Second Corps under Lieutenant General Richard S. Ewell. The regiment fought at the Battle of Mine Run (Payne's Farm) on 27 November 1863. It took 112 into action and sustained 28 casualties.

The 1st Louisiana Infantry fought at the Battle of the Wilderness on 5 May 1864. The brigade was led by Brigadier General Stafford and was part of Johnson's division and Ewell's Second Corps. According to historian Gordon C. Rhea, Stafford's Louisiana brigade had earned a reputation for drinking, pillaging, and hard fighting. Stafford's brigade helped repel Union V Corps attacks at Saunders' Field between 1 and 3 pm on 5 May. In see-saw fighting in dense woods around 3:30 pm, the Stonewall Brigade on Stafford's right was driven back by Union VI Corps troops that then rushed into the gap between the two brigades. Stafford's soldiers were forced to retreat in confusion. Soon after giving the order to fall back, Stafford was fatally shot through the spine. The other Louisiana brigade under Brigadier General Harry T. Hays' was sent from the reserve to help, but it was also mauled in the fighting.

The brigade fought in the Battle of Spotsylvania on 7–20 May 1864. On 12 May, a dawn attack by the Union II Corps overran Johnson's division at the Bloody Angle, capturing 2,800 men and 20 artillery pieces. Johnson himself was captured and his division was practically destroyed. The initial Union success was followed by vicious fighting that lasted the rest of the day, with neither side gaining any further advantage. Most of the soldiers in the 1st Louisiana Infantry were captured in this action. The remnant took part in the Valley campaigns of 1864 in the summer and fall, fighting in the battles of Monocacy, Third Winchester, Fisher's Hill, and Cedar Creek. At Monocacy, the two Louisiana brigades were united under the command of Brigadier General Zebulon York in Major General John B. Gordon's division. At Cedar Creek, in what was once Stafford's brigade, the survivors of 1st Louisiana Infantry were consolidated with the 14th Louisiana Infantry. By October 1864, the consolidated unit was reduced to the strength of a single company.

In December 1864, the regiment returned from the Shenandoah Valley to serve in the Siege of Petersburg. The Petersburg trenches were evacuated on 2 April 1865 and General Robert E. Lee surrendered on 9 April at Appomattox. At the surrender, the 1st Louisiana Infantry counted only 1 officer and 18 enlisted men present for duty. During the war, the regiment suffered losses of 162 men killed in action, 74 died of disease, and 1 died by accident. Another 88 men deserted.

== See also ==
- List of Louisiana Confederate Civil War units
- Louisiana in the Civil War
