= Second Battle of Winchester order of battle: Union =

The following Union Army units and commanders fought in the Second Battle of Winchester of the American Civil War. The Confederate order of battle is listed separately.

== Abbreviations used ==
=== Military rank ===
- MG = Major General
- BG = Brigadier General
- Col = Colonel
- Ltc = Lieutenant Colonel
- Maj = Major
- Cpt = Captain

== Second Division, VIII Corps ==
MG Robert H. Milroy

(8219 officers & men) (103 KIA, 3 MW, 349 WIA, 4210 MIA = 4657 total casualties)

Brigades	Regiments and batteries
1st Brigade (2989 officers & men) (24 KIA, 121 WIA, 1214 MIA = 1359 total casualties) BG Washington Lafayette Elliott	110th Ohio (569 officers & men) (4 KIA, 51 WIA, 210 MIA = 265 total casualties): Col J. Warren Keifer, Ltc William N. Foster; 116th Ohio (619 officers & men) (8 KIA, 29 WIA, 141 MIA = 178 total casualties): Col James Washburn, Ltc Thomas F. Wildes; 122nd Ohio (810 officers & men) ( KIA, MW, WIA, MIA = 413 total casualties): Col William H. Ball, Ltc Moses M. Granger; 12th Pennsylvania Cavalry (620 officers & men) (4 KIA, 12 WIA, 156 MIA = 172 total casualties): Col Lewis B. Pierce; 13th Pennsylvania Cavalry (655 officers & men) (1 WIA, 247 MIA = 248 total casualties): Col James A. Gallagher; 1st West Virginia Artillery, Battery D (95 officers & men; 6x 3-inch Ordnance Rifles) ( 3 WIA, 80 MIA = 83 total casualties): Cpt John Carlin
2nd Brigade (3305 officers & men) (52 KIA, 173 WIA, 1752 MIA = 1977 total casualties) Col William G. Ely (c)	18th Connecticut (820 officers & men) (18 KIA, 46 WIA, 534 MIA = 598 total casualties): Ltc Monroe Nichols (c); Maj Henry Peale; 5th Maryland (est. 645 officers & men) (5 WIA, 315 MIA = 320 total casualties): Col William Louis Schley, Maj Salome Marsh; 123rd Ohio (est. 720 officers & men) (21 KIA, 62 WIA, 466 MIA = 549 total casualties): Col William T. Wilson (c); Ltc Henry B. Hunter (w&c); Maj Horace Kellogg (w); Capt. Frederick K. Shawhan; 87th Pennsylvania (est. 750 officers & men) (11 KIA, 21 WIA, 293 MIA = 325 total casualties): Col John W. Schall; 12th West Virginia (est. 440 officers & men) (6 KIA, 36 WIA, 191 MIA = 233 total casualties): Col John B. Klunk; 1st West Virginia Cavalry, Company K (65 officers & men) (1 WIA, 11 MIA = 12 total casualties): Cpt Weston Rowand; 3rd West Virginia Cavalry, Companies D and E (125 officers & men) (1 WIA, 71 MIA = 72 total casualties): Cpt James R. Utt; 5th U.S. Artillery, Battery L (90 officers & men; 6x 3-inch Ordnance Rifles) (3 KIA, 1 WIA, 77 MIA = 81 total casualties): Lt Wallace F. Randolph (w&c); Lt Edmund Dana Spooner
3rd Brigade (1925 officers & men) (20 KIA, 3 MW, 52 WIA, 993 MIA = 1068 total casualties) Col Andrew T. McReynolds	6th Maryland (580 officers & men) (1 KIA, 6 WIA, 167 MIA = 174 total casualties): Col John W. Horn; 67th Pennsylvania (830 officers & men) (17 KIA, 38 WIA, 736 MIA = 791 total casualties): Col John F. Staunton, Ltc Horace B. Burnham; 106th New York Infantry (detached at Martinsburg); 1st New York Cavalry (420 officers & men) (3 KIA, 3 MW, 3 WIA, 56 MIA = 64 total casualties): Maj Alonzo W. Adams; Baltimore Battery, Maryland Light Artillery (123 officers & men; 6x 3-inch Ordnance Rifles) (5 WIA, 34 MIA = 39 total casualties): Cpt F. W. Alexander; 1st Massachusetts Heavy Artillery, Company I (105 officers & men; 4x 20-pounder Parrott Rifles; 2x 24-pounder Howitzers) (3 WIA, 45 MIA = 48 total casualties): Capt William F. Martins (c); Lt. Jonathan B. Hanson
