= Jesse M. Williams =

Jesse Milton Williams (January 11, 1831 – May 12, 1864) commanded a Louisiana regiment in the American Civil War. He briefly held brigade command at the Battle of Gettysburg. Prior to the Civil War, Williams attended the University of Alabama and lived in Mansfield, Louisiana.

The 2nd Louisiana Infantry was organized in 1861, being mustered into the Confederate service on May 11 of that year. Jesse M. Williams was named captain of the Pelican Rifles, a company recruited in DeSoto Parish and Natchitoches Parish. The original officers of the 2nd Louisiana earned a reputation for drunkenness. Perhaps for this reason, the regiment was reorganized in May 1862 with J. T. Norwood as colonel and Williams as lieutenant colonel. By then the regiment, led by Col William Levy, had seen combat under the command of BG Howell Cobb in the 1862 Battle of Yorktown and the Battle of Seven Pines in the division of MG John B. Magruder.

When Col Norwood was mortally wounded at the Battle of Malvern Hill during an assault by Magruder's division, Williams was named his successor. He led the regiment in the Army's Second Louisiana Brigade at the Battle of Cedar Mountain, the Second Battle of Bull Run and the Battle of Antietam in the brigade of BG William E. Starke in Stonewall Jackson’s command. Williams was wounded in the chest at Antietam in the fighting along the Hagerstown Road. Col Williams did not return to his regiment in time for the Battle of Fredericksburg. Williams returned to active duty in 1863. The regiment fought under BG Francis T. Nicholls at the Battle of Chancellorsville. When Nicholls was wounded on May 2, 1862, eventually losing a foot, Williams became acting brigade commander. The brigade served on the left flank of the Confederate line on May 3, eventually running low on ammunition.

Jesse Williams remained acting brigade commander in the Gettysburg campaign under MG Edward Johnson. In that role, Williams led the attack on Stephenson’s Depot on June 15, 1863, cutting off the retreat of many of the federal troops of Gen Robert Milroy defeated in the Second Battle of Winchester. At Gettysburg on July 2, Williams’ brigade was involved in Johnson’s attack on Culp's Hill. In his report, Williams complained that he was not supported on the right by the brigade of BG John M. Jones. That Louisiana brigade was involved in a renewed assault on July 3. The battle cost Williams 291 of 1,104 troops engaged. Williams later forwarded a petition of his officers asking to be permitted to refill their ranks or go onto garrison duty. This may have helped cost Williams any chance at promotion.

Command of the Second Louisiana Brigade was given to BG Alfred Iverson for the Bristoe Campaign, but it passed eventually to BG Leroy A. Stafford. Williams led his regiment through 1863 under these commanders and at the beginning of 1864 under Stafford. Williams led his regiment at the Battle of the Wilderness, in which Gen Stafford lost his life. Col Zebulon York was Stafford’s immediate successor, but Williams seems to have succeeded to command in time for the Battle of Spotsylvania Courthouse. Williams was killed on May 12, 1864, during the attack of the federal II Corps on the Confederate lines. Ltc Ross E. Burke succeeded to command of the regiment.
