= Donaldsonville Louisiana Artillery =

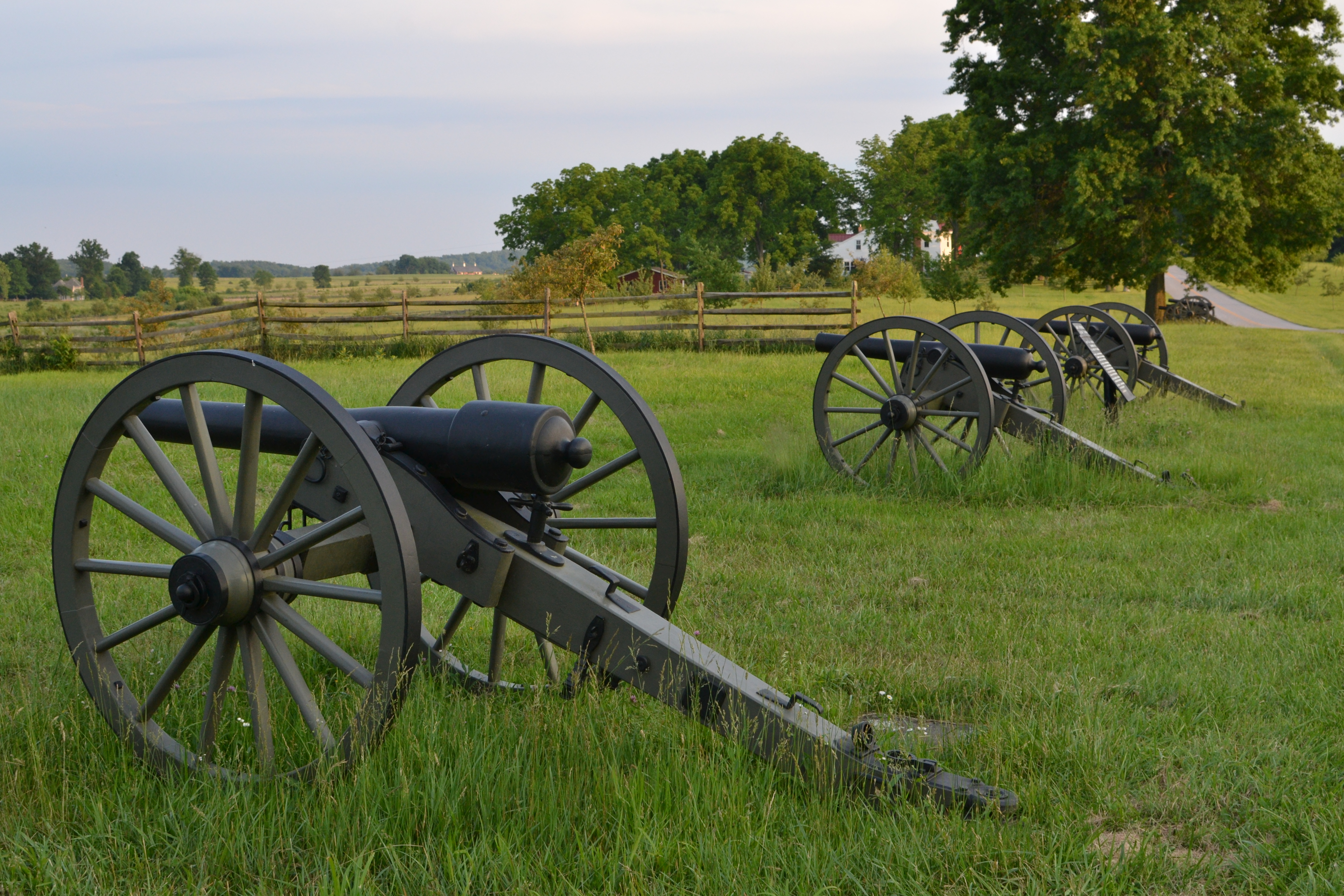
- One 10-pounder Parrot rifle and two 3-inch Ordnance rifles are located where Maurin's battery was placed at Gettysburg National Military Park.
- Active: August 1861 – 9 April 1865
- Country: Confederate States of America
- Allegiance: Confederate States of America; Louisiana
- Branch: Confederate States Army
- Type: Artillery
- Size: Company (103 men, Sept. 1861)
- Nicknames: Maurin's Battery, Landry's Battery
- Equipment: 2 x 10-pounder Parrott rifles 3 x M1841 6-pounder field guns 1 x 3-inch Ordnance rifle (Sept. 1862)
- Engagements: American Civil War; Siege of Yorktown (1862); Battle of Williamsburg (1862); Battle of Seven Pines (1862); Battle of Gaines' Mill (1862); Battle of Glendale (1862); First Battle of Rappahannock Station (1862); Second Battle of Bull Run (1862); Battle of Antietam (1862); Battle of Shepherdstown (1862); Battle of Fredericksburg (1862); Battle of Gettysburg (1863); Bristoe campaign (1863); Mine Run campaign (1863); Overland Campaign (1864); Siege of Petersburg (1864–65); Battle of Appomattox (1865)

Commanders
- Notable commanders: Victor Maurin; R. Prosper Landry

The Donaldsonville Louisiana Artillery was a Louisiana artillery unit that fought in the Confederate States Army during the American Civil War. Formed from an old militia company, it arrived in the Eastern Theater of the American Civil War in September 1861 with three obsolete guns and was equipped with three additional rifled guns. The battery fought at Yorktown, Williamsburg, Seven Pines, Gaines' Mill, Glendale, Second Bull Run, Antietam, Shepherdstown and Fredericksburg in 1862. The following year the unit served at Gettysburg and in the Bristoe and Mine Run campaigns. The battery fought in the Overland Campaign and at the Siege of Petersburg in 1864. It surrendered at Appomattox in April 1865.

== Formation ==
The Donaldsonville Artillery originally existed as a Louisiana state militia company, the Donaldsonville Cannoniers, established in 1837. The unit organized for Confederate service in August 1861 with three M1841 6-pounder field guns. The battery traveled to Richmond, Virginia, where it arrived on 5 September 1861. Three additional rifled guns were provided by the Confederate government. The commander of the battery was Captain Victor Auguste Maurin, who received his officer's commission on 13 September 1861. Maurin was mayor of Donaldsonville, Louisiana, from 1854 to 1861. The battery numbered 103 officers and men on 13 September. (Note: Bergeron stated that the battery arrived in Richmond on 5 September, Glyer asserted that the date was 5 October.)

== Service ==
=== 1861–1862 ===
On 6 November 1861, the Donaldsonville Artillery was ordered to move to Yorktown, Virginia, where it stayed through the winter of 1861–1862. The battery was posted at Wynn's Mill during the Siege of Yorktown from 5 April to 4 May 1862. At Yorktown, the unit was assigned to Brigadier General Raleigh E. Colston's brigade in Major General James Longstreet's division. The Donaldsonville Artillery fought at the Battle of Williamsburg on 5 May, defending Fort Magruder with its 6-pounder guns at the end of the action. On 1 June 1862, the battery played a minor role in the Battle of Seven Pines, during which it was assigned to the artillery reserve of Longstreet's division. During the Seven Days Battles, Maurin's battery was assigned to Brigadier General Roger Atkinson Pryor's brigade in Longstreet's division. The unit fought at the Battle of Gaines' Mill on 27–28 June and the Battle of Glendale on 30 June, sustaining losses of 1 killed and 3 wounded in those actions.

For the Northern Virginia campaign, the Donaldsonville Artillery was assigned to Major General Richard H. Anderson's division in Longstreet's wing of the Army of Northern Virginia. On 23 August 1862, one section (two guns) of Maurin's battery participated in the First Battle of Rappahannock Station but reported no casualties. In this action, General Robert E. Lee's Confederate army faced Major General John Pope's Union army along the Rappahannock River. Lee wanted to move upstream to his left in order to turn Pope's right flank, but first he needed to eliminate a Federal bridgehead downstream at Rappahannock Station. Longstreet ordered a bombardment of the small bridgehead which was answered by Union batteries on the opposite bank; approximately 50 guns were involved in the artillery duel. Finally, Confederate infantry advanced and the Federals abandoned their bridgehead. The battery was present at the Second Battle of Bull Run on 28–30 August, assigned to Longstreet's wing.

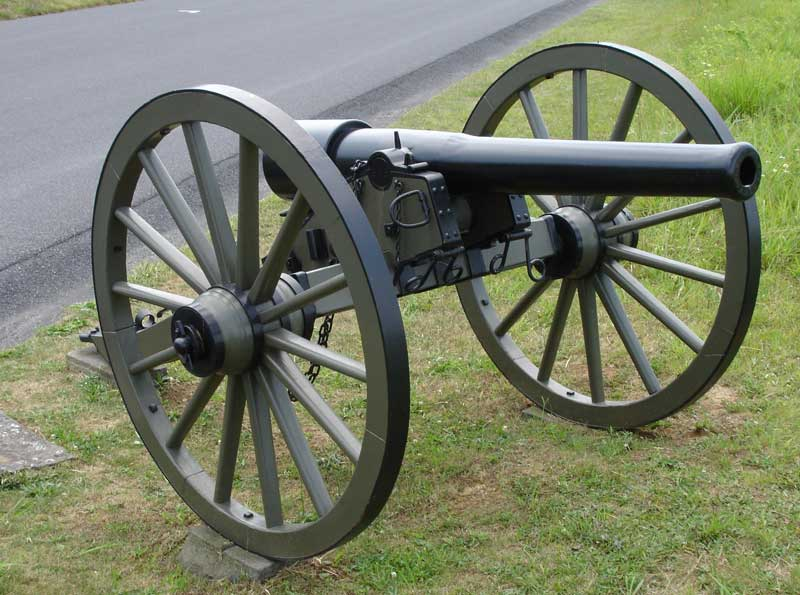
At Antietam, the battery was armed with two captured Federal-made 10-pounder Parrott rifles, as shown.

At the Battle of Antietam on 17 September 1862, the Donaldsonville Artillery was equipped with three 6-pounders, two 10-pounder Parrott rifles, and one 3-inch Ordnance rifle. The battery reported no casualties during the action. Maurin's battery was part of Major John Selden Saunders' artillery battalion, part of Anderson's division. The unit unlimbered near Piper's barn along with Captain Cary F. Grimes' Virginia battery. After bitter fighting, Union forces drove the Confederate infantry from Bloody Lane. After 1:00 pm, a further Union advance was blocked by Saunders' four batteries, including Maurin's. After 2:00 pm, while firing from Cemetery Hill, the battery helped block a Federal thrust from Middle Bridge. At the Battle of Shepherdstown on 19 September, Maurin's battery took losses of 1 killed and 2 wounded. The battery also lost one 10-pounder Parrott rifle, which had originally been captured from 5th U.S. Artillery, Battery D at the First Battle of Bull Run. While retreating cross-country from Union pursuit at night, the crew encountered an impassable woods; they abandoned and spiked the gun. At Shepherdstown, one caisson with 6-pounder ammunition was blown up by a Union shell and 20 horses were killed.

At the Battle of Fredericksburg, the Donaldsonville Artillery remained part of Anderson's division, Longstreet's First Corps, Army of Northern Virginia. During the battle, the battery deployed on Marye's Heights protected by gun pits, and sustained a loss of 1 killed and 6 wounded. Just to the north of the Plank Road, were the two 10-pounder Parrott rifles, under the command of Lieutenant R. Prosper Landry, while farther north was the 3-inch Ordnance rifle and a 6-pounder gun under Lieutenant Camille Mollere. The other two 6-pounders were kept in reserve. Because of the lay of the ground, only one 10-pounder Parrott and the 3-inch rifle were able to take the Union assault columns in enfilade. After firing about 200 rounds, the Federal artillery fired on Maurin's battery with such effect that its fire was somewhat suppressed, though the gun pits protected the gunners. The last Union attack of the day was made by Brigadier General Andrew A. Humphreys' division. In order to fire on Humphreys' troops, which were forming for the assault, one 10-pounder Parrott had to be removed from its protective gun pit. The 10-pounder fired three shots, causing considerable casualties among the massed Union soldiers. However, Federal cannon fire killed one man and wounded three more, including one man whose foot had to be amputated. As the crew loaded a fourth round, a Union shell smashed a wheel, disabling the gun. (Note: It appears as if the 10-pounder Parrott rifle lost at Shepherdstown was replaced by a similar gun.)

=== 1863–1865 ===
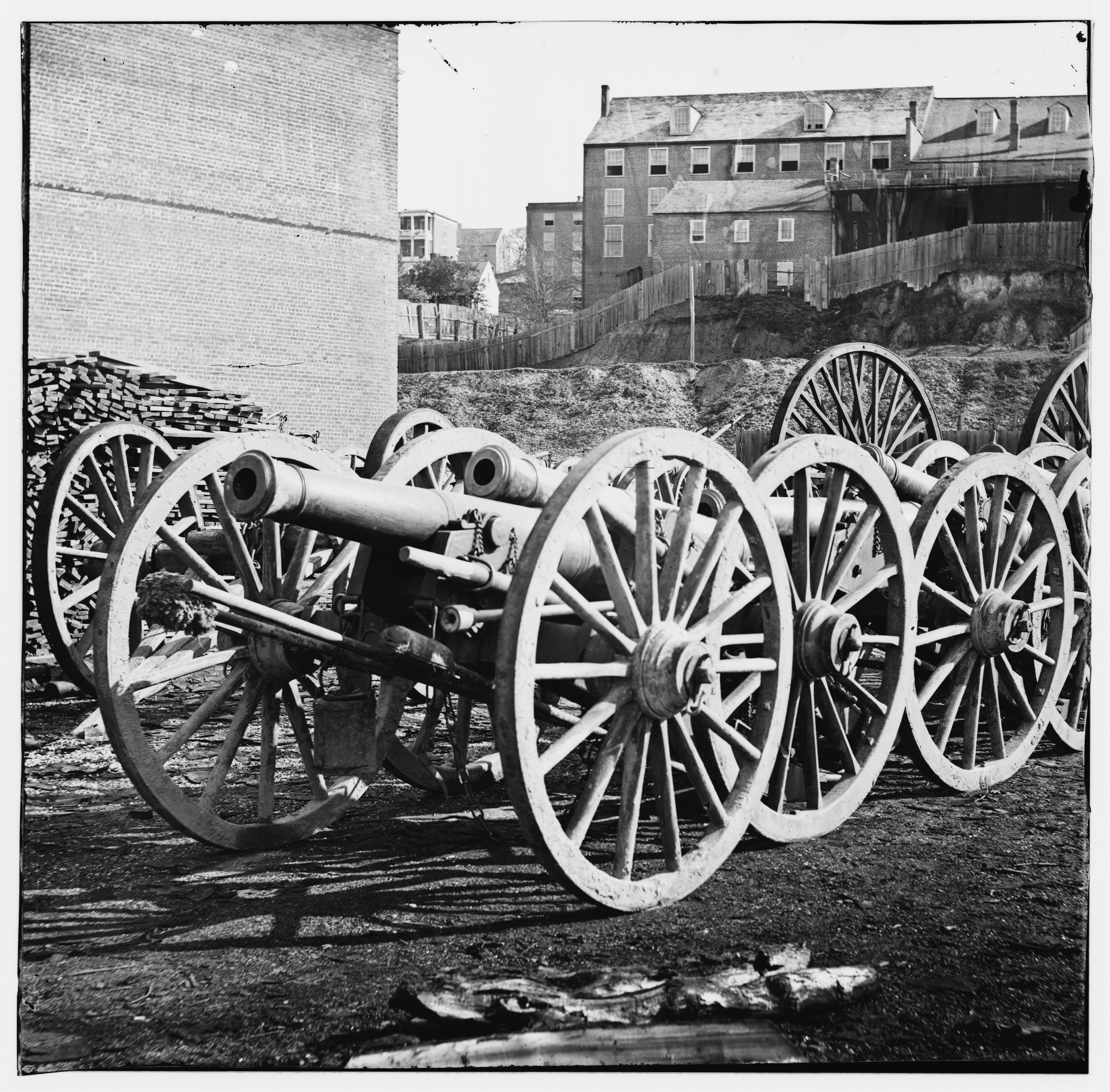
Model 1841 6-pounder field guns

The Donaldsonville Artillery was not engaged at the Battle of Chancellorsville on 1–4 May 1863, according to Arthur W. Bergeron Jr. However, the unit sustained a loss of 1 man wounded during the action. It was assigned to Lieutenant Colonel John J. Garnett's artillery battalion in Anderson's division. At the Battle of Gettysburg, Maurin's battery came into action only on 1 July. The day before the battle, three guns from the unit were detached with Brigadier General J. Johnston Pettigrew's brigade for a reconnaissance. At Gettysburg, the unit was assigned to Garnett's battalion in Major General Henry Heth's division, Third Corps, Army of Northern Virginia. It took 114 officers and men into action and suffered 6 casualties. Maurin's battery was involved in a skirmish on 6 July during the Battle of Williamsport. The battery served during the Bristoe campaign and the Mine Run campaign in fall 1863.

The Donaldsonville Artillery served during the Overland Campaign, including the battles of the Wilderness (5–6 May 1864), Spotsylvania (9–21 May), and Cold Harbor (31 May–12 June). At the Wilderness, Lieutenant Landry commanded the battery, which was part of Lieutenant Colonel Charles Richardson's artillery battalion in the Third Corps. On 11 July 1864, Maurin was promoted major in command of Richardson's battalion and Landry became captain of the Donaldsonville Artillery. The battery was involved in the Siege of Petersburg from the summer of 1864 through March 1865. At Petersburg, Landry's battery was assigned to Richardson's battalion in the Third Corps.

Lee surrendered his army at Appomattox on 9 April after the collapse of his Petersburg defenses. During the Appomattox campaign, Landry's battery was still assigned to Richardson's battalion, under the overall direction of Brigadier General Reuben Lindsay Walker in the Third Corps. At the surrender, Landry, 3 lieutenants, 64 men, and 4 servants were still with the battery. Altogether, 158 officers and men served in the battery during the war; 16 were killed in action while 20 died from disease.

== See also ==
- List of Louisiana Confederate Civil War units
- Louisiana in the Civil War

== Notes ==
Footnotes

Citations
