= Phillips' Legion =

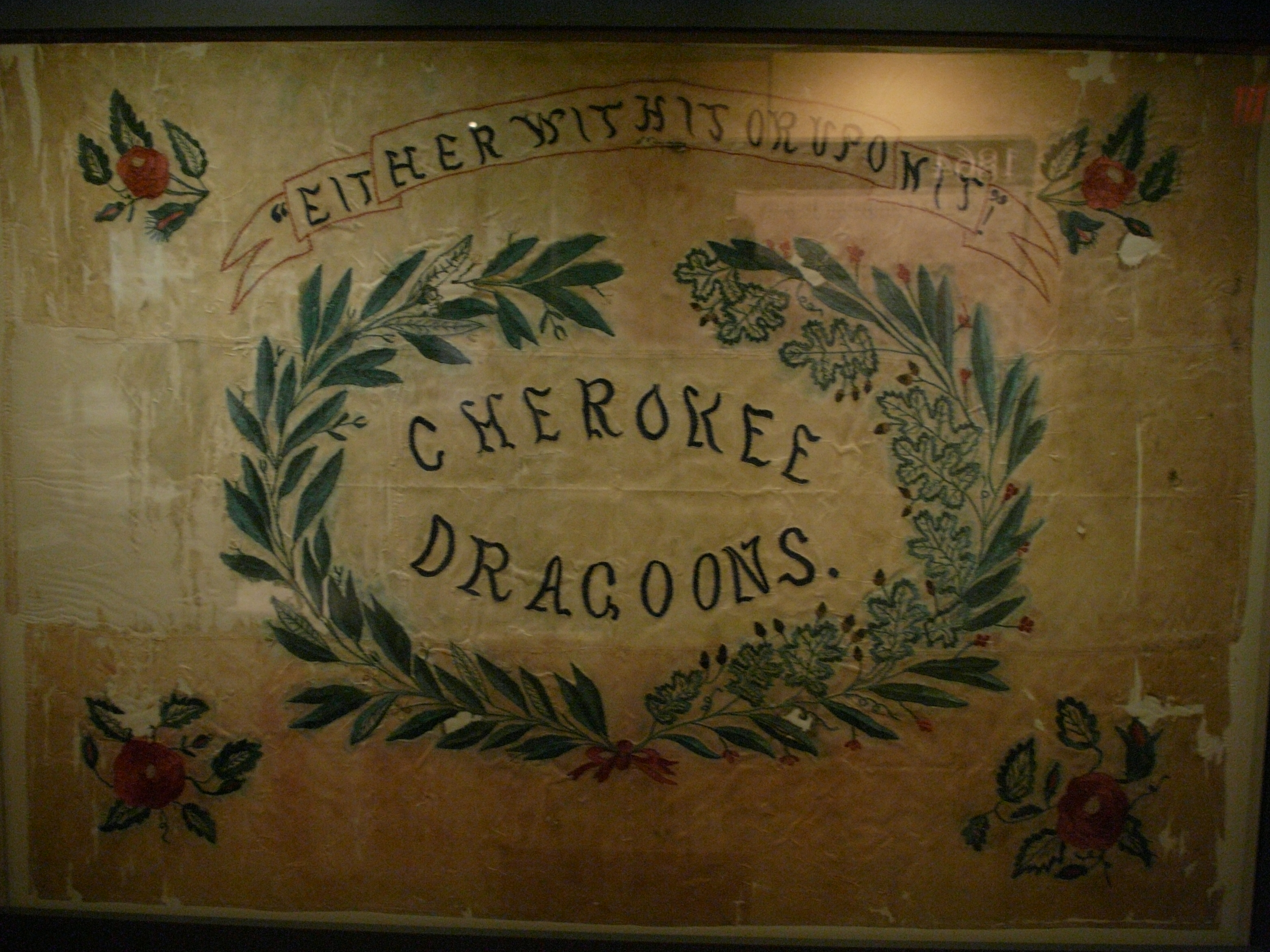
Phillip's Georgia Legion, Cavalry Battalion, Co. I flag

Phillips' Legion or Phillips' Georgia Legion was a unit of the Confederate States Army during the American Civil War.

== Background and formation ==
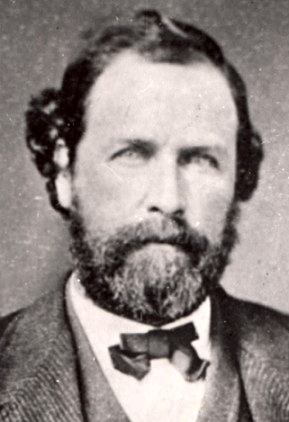
Col. William Phillips

With the outbreak of the war, Georgia Governor Joseph E. Brown gave the task of organizing and training the 4th Brigade to his friend, attorney and militia general William Phillips. Phillips chose as his training base "the old Smyrna Camp Meeting Ground located 4 miles south of Marietta", renaming it "Camp Brown". By April 15, 1861, two heavy infantry regiments and three battalions (one each of light infantry, cavalry and artillery) had been organized. However, Brown clashed with Confederate President Jefferson Davis over states' rights and control of military formations. Under much pressure, he was eventually forced to yield the two regiments to Davis and abandon his plan to place Phillips in charge of the brigade.

Brown formed a legion (which meant at the time a combined arms unit) from the remaining light infantry and cavalry battalions, commanded by Phillips. It initially consisted of a six-company infantry battalion, including the late addition of an all-Irish company known as the Lochrane Guards from Macon, and a four-company cavalry battalion. Brown's request for the artillery battalion to be included was denied by Davis. The legion was accepted into state service in July 1861, and Phillips appointed its colonel the following month.

== Civil War ==
In late 1861, Phillips' Legion was ordered to join the Army of the Kanawha in the western part of Virginia, where the pro-Union residents had seceded from the state. General Robert E. Lee, in his first field assignment in command, was handicapped by the bitter acrimony between his subordinates, Generals Henry A. Wise and John B. Floyd. The campaign did not go well for the South, for which Lee was roundly criticized. Colonel Phillips contracted typhoid fever.

In December 1861, Special Order 268 directed the Legion and the 20th Mississippi to proceed to Coosawhatchie, South Carolina. There, under the command of Brigadier General Thomas Drayton, it guarded railway lines and recuperated from a harsh Virginia winter to which Georgians were unaccustomed. The cavalry was stationed at Hardeeville. Some of the officers went home to recruit replacements for their losses. Phillips, authorized to expand his unit, added three infantry and two cavalry companies by the end of May 1862.

In July, the Legion infantry boarded a train and headed north to join the Army of Northern Virginia as part of Cobb's Brigade. The cavalry followed later, and was assigned to a different brigade. They would remain separated for the remainder of the war (a common fate for Confederate legions), a situation made official by Special Order 104. The cavalry, under Major General J.E.B. Stuart, and the infantry, along with the rest of Cobb's Brigade, both participated in the Battle of Fredericksburg in December. Phillips resigned in 1863.

The Legion fought in the Gettysburg campaign and was mentioned in Brigadier General Wade Hampton's report to the Assistant Adjutant-General, dated August 13, 1863, as having helped repulse a July 2 Union attack between Hunterstown and Gettysburg, Pennsylvania.

The cavalry fought in the Battle of Trevilian Station in June 1864, and the Carolinas campaign in January 1865, while the infantry joined McLaws' Division for the rest of the war.

== See also ==
- List of Civil War regiments from Georgia
- List of American Civil War legions
