= 51st Georgia Infantry Regiment =

Infantry regiment of the Confederate States Army

- Unofficial Georgia flag prior to 1879
- Active: March, 1862–April 9, 1865
- Country: Confederate States of America
- Allegiance: Georgia
- Branch: Confederate States Army
- Type: Infantry
- Engagements: American Civil War

Commanders
- Notable commanders: Colonel William Slaughter

The 51st Georgia Infantry Regiment was an infantry regiment in the Confederate States Army during the American Civil War.

The regiment was formed in March 1862, and initially assigned to defensive duty in South Carolina. It was engaged at the Battle of Secessionville near Charleston before being sent northward for duty in Virginia. Upon reaching Virginia in July 1862, the 51st Georgia was assigned to Drayton's Brigade within the Army of Northern Virginia. After the Battle of Antietam in September, Robert E. Lee decided to reorganize his army for more efficiency, and the 51st Regiment was permanently assigned to Paul Jones Semmes's brigade. The subsequent brigade commanders were Goode Bryan and James P. Simms. The 51st stayed in this brigade for the duration of the Civil War.

The regiment was a part of the Army of Northern Virginia from July 1862 until its surrender at Appomattox Court House, except during James Longstreet's 1863 independent expedition to Georgia and East Tennessee.

== Organization ==
=== Staff ===
- Colonel
  - William Marion Slaughter (March 22, 1862, to May 2, 1863; Killed at Chancellorsville, Virginia)
  - Edward Ball (May 2, 1863, to November 13, 1864; Died of wounds received at Battle of Cedar Creek, October 19, 1864)
  - James Dickey (November 12, 1864, to end of war )
- Lieutenant Colonel
  - James Dickey (January 14, 1864, to November 12, 1864; Promoted to Colonel)
  - John P. Crawford (November 12, 1864, to end of the war)
- Major
  - Oliver Preston Anthony (March 22, 1862, to May 2, 1863; Promoted to Lieutenant Colonel)
  - Henry M. Dunwoody (May 2, 1863, to July 2, 1863; Killed at Gettysburg)
  - James Dickey (July 2, 1863, to January 14, 1864; Promoted to Lieutenant Colonel)
  - John P. Crawford (January 14, 1864, to November 12, 1864; Promoted to Lieutenant Colonel)

=== Companies ===
- Company A (Early Volunteers) was formed in Early County.
- Company B (Lee Guards) was formed in Lee County.
- Company C (Mitchell Van Guards) was formed in Mitchell County.
- Company D (Miller Guards) was formed in Baker, Colquitt and Miller counties.
- Company E (Pochitla Guards) was formed in Baker and Calhoun counties.
- Company F (Terrell Infantry) was formed in Terrell County.
- Company G (Harrison Volunteers) was formed in Quitman County.
- Company H (Randolph Rangers) was formed in Randolph County.
- Company I (Clay Volunteers) was formed in Clay County.
- Company K (Dougherty Grays) was formed in Dougherty County.

== Battles ==
- Secessionville (June 16, 1862)
- Second Bull Run (August 28–30, 1862)
- South Mountain (September 14, 1862)
- Antietam (September 17, 1862)
- Fredericksburg (December 13, 1862)
- Chancellorsville (May 1–4, 1863)
- Gettysburg (July 1–3, 1863)
- Chickamauga [not engaged] (September 19–20, 1863)
- Chattanooga Siege (September–November 1863)
- Knoxville Siege (November–December 1863)
  - Battle of Fort Sanders
- The Wilderness (May 5–6, 1864)
- Spotsylvania Court House (May 8–21, 1864)
- North Anna (May 23–26, 1864)
- Cold Harbor (June 1–3, 1864)
- Petersburg Siege (June 1864-April 1865)
- Cedar Creek (October 19, 1864)
- Sayler's Creek (April 6, 1865)
- Battle of Appomattox Court House (April 9, 1865)

== See also ==
- List of Civil War regiments from Georgia
