= 24th Georgia Infantry Regiment =

Infantry regiment of the Confederate States Army

- Unofficial Georgia flag prior to 1879
- Active: 1861 – September 2, 1865
- Country: Confederate States of America
- Allegiance: Georgia
- Branch: Confederate States Army
- Type: Infantry
- Engagements: American Civil War: Seven Days' Battles; Crampton's Gap; Sharpsburg; Fredericksburg; Chancellorsville; Gettysburg; Knoxville; Wilderness; Spotsylvania; Cold Harbor; Sayler's Creek; Appomattox

Commanders
- Notable commanders: Colonel Robert McMillan

The 24th Georgia Infantry Regiment was an infantry regiment in the Confederate States Army during the American Civil War. The regiment was part of Thomas Cobb's brigade at the Battle of Fredericksburg.

== Organization ==
The 24th Infantry Regiment, organized during the summer of 1861, recruited its members in Franklin, White, Banks, Towns, Rabun, Gwinnett, Elbert, Hall, and Habersham counties. The field officers were Colonels Robert McMillan and C. C. Sanders, Lieutenant Colonels Joseph N. Chandler and Thomas E. Winn, and Majors Robert E. McMillan and Frederick C. Smith. After serving in the Department of North Carolina, the unit moved to Virginia where it was brigaded under Generals Howell Cobb, T. R. R. Cobb, Wofford, and DuBose.

== Service record ==
The 24th Infantry Regiment fought in the difficult campaigns of the Army of Northern Virginia from the Seven Days Battles to Gettysburg, then moved to Georgia with Longstreet. The 24th was not engaged at Chickamauga, but did see action in the Knoxville Campaign. The regiment returned to Virginia and participated in the conflicts at The Wilderness, Spotsylvania, and Cold Harbor, was active in the Shenandoah Valley, and ended the war at Appomattox.

Soon after being mustered into Confederate service the regiment was moved to Lynchburg, Virginia. Within a week of arriving there, however, it was ordered to Goldsborough, North Carolina. There it joined the Department of North Carolina. The unit remained there until early in 1862. Returning to Virginia, the unit was placed in the Army of Northern Virginia. It served in that army until the summer of 1863. At that time it was moved to Georgia where it served in the Army of Tennessee. It next saw service in the Department of East Tennessee. In the spring of 1864 the regiment returned to the Army of Northern Virginia, remaining in that army until mid-summer 1864. It then moved to the Shenandoah Valley where it served in the Army of the Valley District. Finally, in December 1864, the unit returned to the Army of Northern Virginia, serving in that army for the remainder of the war.

Listed below are the specific higher command assignments of the regiment.

- Sep 30, 1861 - Attached, Coast Defense, Department of North Carolina
- Apr 30, 1862 - Cobb's Brigade, McLaws' Division, Right of Position, Army of Northern Virginia
- May 21, 1862 - Cobb's Brigade, Third Division, Army of Northern Virginia
- Jul 21, 1862 - Second Brigade, McLaws' Division, Longstreet's Corps, Army of Northern Virginia
- Sep 20, 1862 - Cobb's Brigade, McLaws' Division, Longstreet's Corps, Army of Northern Virginia
- Dec 10, 1862 - Cobb's Brigade, McLaws' Division, First Corps, Army of Northern Virginia
- May 1, 1863 - Wofford's Brigade, McLaws' Division, First Corps, Army of Northern Virginia
- Oct 01, 1863 - Wofford's Brigade, McLaws' Division, Longstreet's Corps, Army of Tennessee
- Dec 01, 1863 - Wofford's Brigade, McLaws' Division, Department of East Tennessee
- May 1, 1864 - Wofford's Brigade, Kershaw's Division, First Corps, Army of Northern Virginia
- Oct 01, 1864 - Wofford's Brigade, Kershaw's Division, Second Corps, Army of the Valley District
- Dec 31, 1864 - Wofford's Brigade, Kershaw's Division, First Corps, Army of Northern Virginia
- Apr 01, 1865 - DuBose's Brigade, Kershaw's Division, First Corps, Army of Northern Virginia

== Engagements ==
- Skirmish, Warwick Road, Va. Apr 05, 1862
- Siege, Yorktown, Va. Apr 05 - May 4, 1862
- Engagement, Lee's Mills, Burnt Chimneys, Dam No. 1, Va. Apr 16, 1862
- Evacuation, Yorktown, Va. May 4, 1862
- Skirmish, Ellison's Mills near Mechanicsville, Va. May 23, 1862
- Battle, Seven Pines, Fair Oaks, Va. May 31 - Jun 01, 1862
- Seven Days Battles Jun 25 - Jul 01, 1862
- Battle, Peach Orchard (Allen's Farm) near Fair Oaks Station Jun 29, 1862
- Battle, Savage Station, Va. Jun 29, 1862
- Battle, Malvern Hill, Crew's Farm (Poindexter's Farm) Jul 01, 1862
- Engagement, Malvern Hill, Va. Aug 05, 1862
- Campaign in Northern Virginia (Second Bull Run Campaign) Aug 16 - Sep 02, 1862
- Maryland Campaign Sep 06 - Sep 22, 1862
- Action, Maryland Heights, Md. Sep 12 - Sep 13, 1862
- Siege, Harper's Ferry, W. Va. Sep 13 - Sep 15, 1862
- Battle, Antietam, Sharpsburg, Md. Sep 16 - Sep 17, 1862
- Operations in Loudoun, Fauquier, and Rappahannock Co, Va. Oct 26 - Nov 10, 1862
- Battle, Fredericksburg, Va. Dec 12 - Dec 15, 1862
- Chancellorsville Campaign Apr 27 - May 6, 1863
- Battle, Chancellorsville, Va. May 1–5, 1863
- Gettysburg Campaign Jun 03 - Aug 01, 1863
- Battle, Gettysburg, Pa. Jul 01 - Jul 03, 1863
- Retreat to near Manassas Gap, Va. Jul 05 - Jul 24, 1863
- Skirmish near Manassas Gap, Va. Jul 23, 1863
- Battle, Chickamauga, Ga. Sep 19 - Sep 21, 1863
- Siege, Chattanooga, Tenn. Sep 24 - Oct 30, 1863
- Engagement, Wauhatchie, Tenn. Oct 28 - Oct 29, 1863
- Knoxville Campaign Nov 04 - Dec 23, 1863
- Skirmish, Little River, Tenn. Nov 15, 1863
- Siege, Knoxville, Tenn. Nov 17 - Dec 04, 1863
- Assault, Forts Saunders and Loudon, Knoxville, Tenn. Nov 29, 1863
- Operations about Dandridge, Tenn. Jan 16 - Jan 17, 1864
- Wilderness Campaign May 4 - Jun 12, 1864
- Battle, Wilderness, Va. May 5–7, 1864
- Battles about Spotsylvania Court House, Laurel Hill, Ni River, Fredericksburg Road, Va. May 8–21, 1864
- Assault on the Salient, Spotsylvania Court House, Vs. May 12, 1864
- Operations on the line of the North Anna River, Va. May 22–26, 1864
- Operations on the line of the Pamunkey River, Va. May 26–28, 1864
- Operations on the line of the Totopotomoy River, Va. May 28–31, 1864
- Battles about Cold Harbor, Va. Jun 01 - Jun 12, 1864
- Assault, Petersburg, Va. Jun 16, 1864
- Siege Operations against Petersburg and Richmond, Va. Jun 16 - Jul ??, 1864
- Assault, Petersburg, Va. Jun 18, 1864
- Sheridan's Campaign in the Shenandoah Valley, Va. Aug 07 - Nov 28, 1864
- Engagement, Cedarville, Guard Hill (Front Royal), Va. Aug 16, 1864
- Action, Bunker Hill, W. Va. Sep 02 - Sep 03, 1864
- Battle, Opequon, Winchester, Va. Sep 19, 1864
- Battle, Fisher's Hill, Woodstock, Va. Sep 22, 1864
- Battle, Cedar Creek, Middletown, Belle Grove, Va. Oct 19, 1864
- Siege Operations against Petersburg and Richmond, Va. Dec ??, 1864 - Apr 02, 1865
- Appomattox Campaign Mar 28 - Apr 09, 1865
- Engagement, Sailor's Creek, Va. Apr 06, 1865
- Engagement, Clover Hill, Appomattox Court House, Va. Apr 09, 1865
- Surrender, Appomattox Court House, Va. Apr 09, 1865

== Casualties ==
In April 1862, this regiment totaled 660 effectives, lost 43 percent of the 292 engaged at Crampton's Gap, and had four killed, 39 wounded, and two missing at Sharpsburg. It sustained 36 casualties at Fredericksburg, reported 14 killed and 73 wounded at Chancellorsville, and of the 303 at Gettysburg, 17 percent were disabled. Many were captured at Sayler's Creek and only four officers and 56 men surrendered on April 9, 1865.

== In popular culture ==
In the movie, Gods and Generals, it is identified as "Brigadier General Thomas R.R. Cobb's Irish Regiment, Georgia, C.S.A.".

== See also ==
- List of Civil War regiments from Georgia
