= 15th Louisiana Infantry Regiment =

Infantry regiment of the Confederate States Army

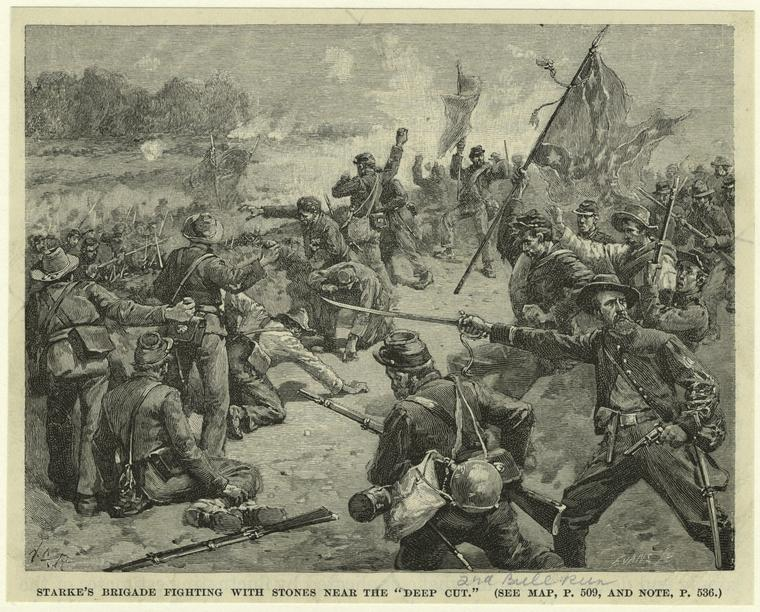
- At the Second Battle of Bull Run, the men of Starke's Louisiana Brigade hurled rocks at the Federals on the opposite side of the railroad embankment.
- Active: 16 June 1861 – 9 April 1865
- Country: Confederate States of America
- Allegiance: Louisiana
- Branch: Confederate States Army
- Type: Infantry
- Size: Regiment
- Part of: 2nd Louisiana Brigade (Starke's, Nicholls', Stafford's, York's)
- Engagements: American Civil War; Siege of Yorktown (1862); Battle of Williamsburg (1862); Battle of Seven Pines (1862); Battle of Beaver Dam Creek (1862); Battle of Gaines' Mill (1862); Battle of Glendale (1862); Battle of Cedar Mountain (1862); Second Battle of Bull Run (1862); Battle of Antietam (1862); Battle of Fredericksburg (1862); Battle of Chancellorsville (1863); Second Battle of Winchester (1863); Battle of Gettysburg (1863); Battle of Mine Run (1863); Battle of the Wilderness (1864); Battle of Spotsylvania (1864); Battle of Cold Harbor (1864); Battle of Monocacy (1864); Third Battle of Winchester (1864); Battle of Fisher's Hill (1864); Battle of Cedar Creek (1864); Siege of Petersburg (1864–65); Battle of Appomattox (1865)

Commanders
- Notable commanders: Edmund Pendleton

The 15th Louisiana Infantry Regiment was a unit of volunteers recruited in Louisiana that fought in the Confederate States Army during the American Civil War. Formed in June 1861 as the 2nd Regiment, Polish Brigade, the unit was sent to fight in the Eastern Theater of the American Civil War. As the 3rd Louisiana Infantry Battalion, the unit served at Beaver Dam Creek and Glendale. After two companies from the 7th Louisiana Infantry Battalion were added in July 1862, the unit reorganized as the 15th Louisiana Infantry Regiment. It joined the 2nd Louisiana Brigade and fought at Cedar Mountain, Second Bull Run, Antietam, and Fredericksburg in 1862. It served at Chancellorsville, Second Winchester, Gettysburg, and Mine Run in 1863. The regiment fought at the Wilderness, Spotsylvania, Cold Harbor, Monocacy, Third Winchester, Fisher's Hill, Cedar Creek, and Petersburg in 1864. A handful of survivors surrendered at Appomattox in 1865.

== See also ==
- List of Louisiana Confederate Civil War units
- Louisiana in the Civil War
