= 10th Louisiana Infantry Regiment =

Infantry regiment of the Confederate States Army

- Active: 1862–1865
- Country: Confederate States of America
- Allegiance: Louisiana
- Branch: Confederate States Army
- Type: Infantry
- Size: Regiment
- Nickname(s): Lee's Foreign Legion
- Engagements: American Civil War

The 10th Louisiana Infantry Regiment was a Louisiana infantry unit of the Confederate States of America that operated with the Army of Northern Virginia of the American Civil War. It was known as "Lee's Foreign Legion" due to the large numbers of foreign-born troops.

== Unit composition ==
10th Infantry Regiment was assembled at Camp Moore, Louisiana, during June and July 1861, and soon moved to Virginia. Its members were from Orleans and Bossier and St. Landry parishes many were farmers, sailors, and laborers. Wearing zouave uniforms, the regiment was composed of many foreigners as well as Southerners from other states; but overall probably about one-third of the unit was Irish only about three companies of the unit were of native Southern descent.

In April 1862, it totaled 595 men and during the war served in McLaws', Semmes', Starke's, Nicholls', Iverson's, Stafford's, and York's Brigades.

== Engagements ==
The 10th Louisiana fought in many engagements of the Army of the Northern Virginia from the Battle of Williamsburg to the Battle of Cold Harbor. At the Battle of Gettysburg in July 1863, the regiment was part of the brigade of Col. Jesse Williams and participated in a series of unsuccessful attacks on Union entrenchments on Culp's Hill. Later, the 10th was part of the Mine Run and Bristoe campaigns.

After participating in the Overland Campaign in early 1864, the 10th then was active in the Shenandoah Valley with General Early. In the spring of 1865, it took part in the Appomattox Campaign.

== Losses ==
The brigade lost 27% of the 318 engaged at the Battle of Malvern Hill, had 16 killed, 33 wounded, and 7 missing at the Battle of Antietam, and 15 killed and 51 wounded at the Battle of Chancellorsville. The regiment reported 3 wounded at the Second Battle of Winchester and lost more than forty-five percent of the 226 at the Battle of Gettysburg. On April 9, 1865, only 4 officers and 13 men surrendered after the Battle of Appomattox Courthouse.

== Officers ==
The field officers were Colonels Antoine James de Marigny, Henry D. Monier, and Eugene Waggaman; Lieutenant Colonels Jules C. Denis and J. M. Legett; and Majors Felix Dumonteil, Thomas N. Powell, and William H. Spencer.

== See also ==
- List of Louisiana Confederate Civil War units
