= 42nd Virginia Infantry Regiment =

- Flag of Virginia, 1861
- Active: July 1861 – April 1865
- Disbanded: April 1865
- Country: Confederacy
- Allegiance: Confederate States of America
- Branch: Confederate States Army
- Type: Infantry
- Engagements: American Civil War: First Battle of Kernstown; Jackson's Valley Campaign; Seven Days' Battles; Battle of Cedar Mountain; Second Battle of Bull Run; Battle of Antietam; Battle of Fredericksburg; Battle of Chancellorsville; Battle of Gettysburg; Battle of Cold Harbor; Siege of Petersburg; Battle of Sayler's Creek; Appomattox Campaign

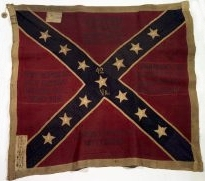
Battle color of the 42nd Virginia

The 42nd Virginia Infantry Regiment was an infantry regiment raised in Virginia for service in the Confederate States Army during the American Civil War. It fought mostly with the Army of Northern Virginia.

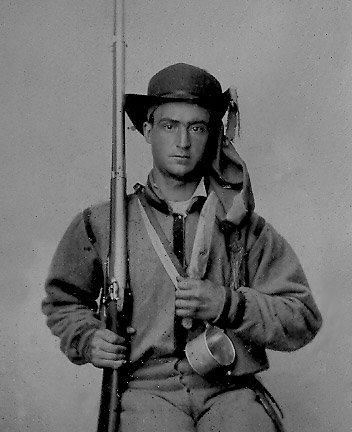
Brunswick County native Andrew J. Winn, 42nd Virginia Infantry, Confederate States of America. Died at Battle of Spotsylvania Courthouse, May 1864

== History ==
The 42nd Virginia, organized at Staunton, Virginia, in July 1861, recruited its members in Henry, Floyd, Bedford, Campbell, Roanoke, Patrick, and Franklin counties.

After fighting at First Kernstown and in Jackson's Valley Campaign, the unit was assigned to J.R. Jones' and W. Terry's Brigade, Army of Northern Virginia. It was active in many conflicts from the Seven Days' Battles to Cold Harbor, then moved with Early to the Shenandoah Valley and was involved in the Appomattox operations. This regiment reported 70 casualties at First Kernstown and totaled 750 effectives in May 1862. It sustained no losses during the Seven Days' Battles but had many at Cedar Mountain. There were 62 disabled at Second Manassas, 26 at Fredericksburg, and 135 at Chancellorsville. Of the 265 engaged at Gettysburg, twenty-one percent were killed, wounded, or missing. Only 1 officer and 44 men surrendered.

== Field officers ==
The field officers were Colonels Jesse S. Burks, Andrew J. Deyerle, John E. Penn, and R. W. Withers; Lieutenant Colonels Daniel A. Langhorne, William Martin, and Samuel H. Saunders; and Majors P. B. Adams, Henry Lane, and Jesse M. Richardson.

== See also ==
- List of Virginia Civil War units
