= 44th Georgia Infantry Regiment =

Infantry regiment of the Confederate States Army

- Unofficial Georgia flag prior to 1879
- Active: March, 1862 – April, 1865
- Country: Confederate States of America
- Allegiance: Confederate States Army
- Branch: Infantry
- Type: Regiment
- Engagements: American Civil War: Battle of Beaver Dam Creek; Battle of Second Bull Run; Antietam/Sharpsburg; Fredericksburg; Chancellorsville; Gettysburg; The Wilderness; Battle of Spotsylvania Court House; Battle of Cold Harbor; Battle of Cedar Creek; Siege of Petersburg; Battle of Fort Stedman; Appomattox Campaign

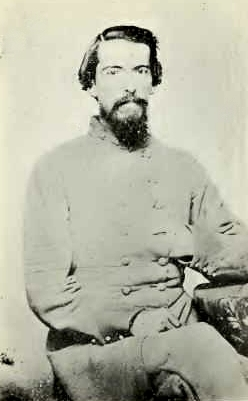
Col. John B. Estes

The 44th Georgia Infantry Regiment was an infantry regiment in the Confederate States Army during the American Civil War.

== History ==
The 44th Georgia Volunteer Infantry Regiment was entered into service in the Confederate States Army on March 11, 1862, at Camp Stephens near Griffin, Georgia. The regiment consisted of the following 10 companies:

- Company A- Weems' Guards, Henry County, Georgia
- Company B- Jasper Volunteers, Jasper County, Georgia
- Company C- Johnson Guards, Clarke County, Georgia
- Company D- Estes Guards, Clayton County, Georgia
- Company E- Freeman Volunteers, Spalding County, Georgia
- Company F- Putnam Volunteers, Putnam County, Georgia
- Company G- Huie Guards, Fayette County, Georgia
- Company H- The Pike County Volunteers, Pike County, Georgia
- Company I- Morgan and Henry Volunteers, Henry County and Morgan County, Georgia
- Company K- The Greene County Volunteers, Greene County, Georgia

== Assignments ==
- Walkers Brigade, Department of North Carolina (April - June 1862)
- Ripley's Brigade, D. H. Hill's Division, Army of Northern Virginia (June - September 1862)
- Ripley's-Doles'-Cook's Brigade, D. H. Hill's_Rodes' Division, 2nd Corps, Army of Northern Virginia (September 1862 - June 1864)
- Cook's Brigade, Rodes'-Grimes' Division, Valley District, Department of Northern Virginia (June - December 1864)
- Cook's Brigade, Grimes' Division, 2nd Corps, Army of Northern Virginia (December 1864 - April 1865)

== Commanding officers ==
- Col. Robert A. Smith
- Col. John B. Estes
- Col. Samuel P. Lumpkin
- Col. William H. Peebles
- Cpt. Thomas R. Daniel
- Cpt. John Tucker (detached from the 21st Georgia Infantry Regiment)

== See also ==
- List of Civil War regiments from Georgia

== Bibliography ==
- Crute Jr., Joseph H., Units of the Confederate States Army, Derwent Books, 1987.
- Thomas, Henry, History of Doles-Cook Brigade, 1903, Reprinted by Morningside Books, 1988.
