= John M. Jones =

Confederate States Army officer (1820–1864)

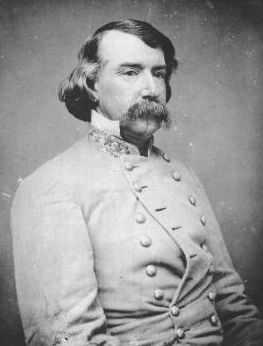
- Jones in uniform, c. 1862
- Born: John Marshall Jones; July 20, 1820; Charlottesville, Virginia, U.S.
- Died: May 5, 1864 (aged 43); Spotsylvania County, Virginia, C.S.
- Burial place: Maplewood Cemetery; Charlottesville, Virginia, U.S.
- Military career
- Allegiance: United States; Confederate States
- Branch: United States Army; Confederate States Army
- Service years: 1841–1861 (U.S.); 1861–1864 (C.S.)
- Rank: Captain (U.S.); Brigadier General (C.S.)
- Unit: 7th Infantry Regiment
- Commands: Jones' Brigade
- Conflicts: Utah War; American Civil War; Battle of Front Royal; Seven Days Battles; Second Battle of Bull Run; Battle of Fredericksburg; Battle of Chancellorsville; Battle of Gettysburg; Battle of the Wilderness †

John Marshall Jones (July 20, 1820 – May 5, 1864) was a brigadier general in the Confederate States Army during the American Civil War. He fought at the Battle of Gettysburg and was killed in action at the Battle of the Wilderness.

== Early life and education ==
Jones was born in Charlottesville, Virginia. At West Point, he was nicknamed "Rum" Jones for his fondness for alcohol. He graduated in 1841, ranking 39th in a class of 52. Nineteen of his classmates would become Civil War generals, including John F. Reynolds, Nathaniel Lyon, Robert S. Garnett, Richard B. Garnett, Amiel W. Whipple, and Israel B. Richardson, all of whom would also die in combat.

Assigned as a second lieutenant to the 7th Infantry Regiment, he was on frontier duty before returning to the U.S. Military Academy in 1845 as an assistant instructor of infantry tactics, serving until 1852. From 1854 until 1855, he served on a board commissioned to revise rifle and light artillery military tactics, and received a promotion to captain on March 3, 1855. Jones performed garrison duty at various forts across the country for a short period before participating in the Utah War from 1858 until 1860.

== American Civil War ==
With the outbreak of the Civil War and Virginia's secession, Jones resigned his commission in the United States Army on May 27, 1861, to enter the Confederate service as a captain of artillery. He was appointed a colonel of infantry and served in what became the Army of Northern Virginia. He participated as a staff officer in Stonewall Jackson's Shenandoah Valley Campaign of 1862, Front Royal, the Seven Days Battles, the Second Battle of Bull Run, Fredericksburg, and Chancellorsville. In May, Jones was promoted to brigadier general in Edward "Allegheny" Johnson's division to replace John R. Jones (not related). During Johnson's assault on Culp's Hill at Gettysburg, Jones suffered a severe wound to his thigh that put him out of action. Some sources say that it was a head wound, but in his official report, Jones cites extreme hemorrhaging of his thigh. In August, Robert E. Lee called Jones "a good commander" when he assigned him to lead the brigade vacated by William "Extra Billy" Smith, who had returned to Virginia as governor. In November he returned to command of his old brigade, replacing Bradley T. Johnson. He was wounded again during the subsequent Mine Run Campaign.

In the early days of the Overland Campaign of 1864, Jones was killed at the Wilderness while attempting to rally his wavering men. His brigade had taken a position on the south side of the Orange Turnpike. Shortly before 1:00 p.m., it was hit hard by Brig. General Joseph J. Bartlett's V Corps brigade, which began pushing back the Confederates, many in disorder. Jones and his aide-de-camp Robert Early were killed while desperately trying to restore order. Jones's body was eventually returned home and buried in Maplewood Cemetery in Charlottesville.

Lieutenant-General Richard S. Ewell wrote of Jones's death in his official report on the Wilderness, "I considered his loss an irreparable one to his brigade."

== Personal life ==
Jones's sister was married to famed Confederate general A.P. Hill's older brother Thomas.

== See also ==
- List of Confederate States Army generals
