= 7th Louisiana Infantry Regiment =

Infantry regiment of the Confederate States Army

7th Louisiana Infantry Regiment (Confederate)
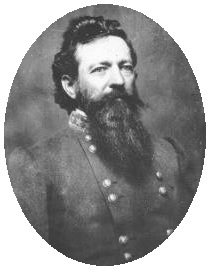
- Colonel Harry T. Hays of the 7th Louisiana later became general of the 1st Louisiana Brigade.
- Active: 5 June 1861 – 9 April 1865
- Country: Confederate States of America
- Allegiance: Louisiana
- Branch: Confederate States Army
- Type: Infantry
- Size: Regiment (944 men, June 1861)
- Part of: 1st Louisiana Brigade (Taylor's and Hays')
- Engagements: American Civil War; Battle of Blackburn's Ford (1861); First Battle of Bull Run (1861); Battle of Front Royal (1862); First Battle of Winchester (1862); Battle of Cross Keys (1862); Battle of Port Republic (1862); Battle of Gaines' Mill (1862); Battle of Malvern Hill (1862); Battle of Cedar Mountain (1862); Second Battle of Bull Run (1862); Battle of Chantilly (1862); Battle of Harpers Ferry (1862); Battle of Antietam (1862); Battle of Fredericksburg (1862); Battle of Chancellorsville (1863); Second Battle of Winchester (1863); Battle of Gettysburg (1863); Second Battle of Rappahannock Station (1863); Battle of the Wilderness (1864); Battle of Spotsylvania (1864); Battle of Cold Harbor (1864); Battle of Monocacy (1864); Second Battle of Kernstown (1864); Third Battle of Winchester (1864); Battle of Fisher's Hill (1864); Battle of Cedar Creek (1864); Siege of Petersburg (1864–65); Battle of Appomattox (1865)

Commanders
- Notable commanders: Harry T. Hays; Davidson Bradfute Penn

The 7th Louisiana Infantry Regiment was a unit of volunteers recruited in Louisiana that fought in the Confederate States Army during the American Civil War. Formed in June 1861, the regiment was sent to fight in the Eastern Theater of the American Civil War. After fighting at First Bull Run, the unit joined the 1st Louisiana Brigade. The regiment served in Jackson's Valley campaign and at Gaines' Mill, Malvern Hill, Cedar Mountain, Second Bull Run, Harpers Ferry, Antietam, and Fredericksburg in 1862. The regiment fought at Chancellorsville, Second Winchester, and Gettysburg in 1863. At Rappahannock Station in November 1863, almost the entire regiment was captured. The remnant of the unit fought at the Wilderness, Spotsylvania, Cold Harbor, and the Valley campaigns of 1864. It served at Petersburg starting in December 1864 and surrendered at Appomattox in April 1865.

== Formation ==
The 7th Louisiana Infantry regiment formed at Camp Moore on 5 June 1861 with 944 soldiers. Ten companies were organized, named from A to K, excluding J. The field officers were Colonel Harry T. Hays, Lieutenant Colonel Charles De Choiseul, and Major Davidson Bradfute Penn. On 1 January 1863 Captain Daniel A. Wilson Jr. (Company I) was appointed judge-advocate Second Corps, Army of Northern Virginia. In May 1863 Captain Andrew S. Herron (B Company) was promoted colonel and appointed to a military court.

Company information for the 7th Louisiana Infantry Regiment
Company	Nickname	Captains	Recruitment Parish
A	Continental Guards	George Clark (r); Edwin McFarland (m-Antietam); William P. Thompson (m-Gettysburg); Lawrence Pendergast	Orleans
B	Baton Rouge Fencibles	Andrew S. Herron (p); William A. Martin	East Baton Rouge
C	Sarsfield Rangers	J. Moore Wilson (p); Charles Cameron (r)	Orleans
D	Virginia Guards	Robert P. Scott (r); Louis H. Malarcher	Orleans
E	Crescent City Rifles Company B	Samuel H. Gilman (r); Conrad Green	Orleans
F	Irish Volunteers	William B. Ratliff (r); Thomas Gibbs Morgan (d); Thomas W. Kerrigan (r)	Assumption
G	American Rifles	William D. Rickarby (r); Samuel Flower	Orleans
H	Crescent City Rifles Company C	Henry T. Jett (r); William P. Harper (r)	Orleans
I	Virginia Blues	Daniel A. Wilson Jr. (p); Charles E. Bellinger	Orleans
K	Livingston Rifles	Thomas M. Terry (p); Alpheus G. Tucker (r); William F. Ogden	Livingston

- Key: d = died, k = killed, m = mortally wounded, p = promoted, r = resigned.

== Service ==
=== 1861–1862 ===
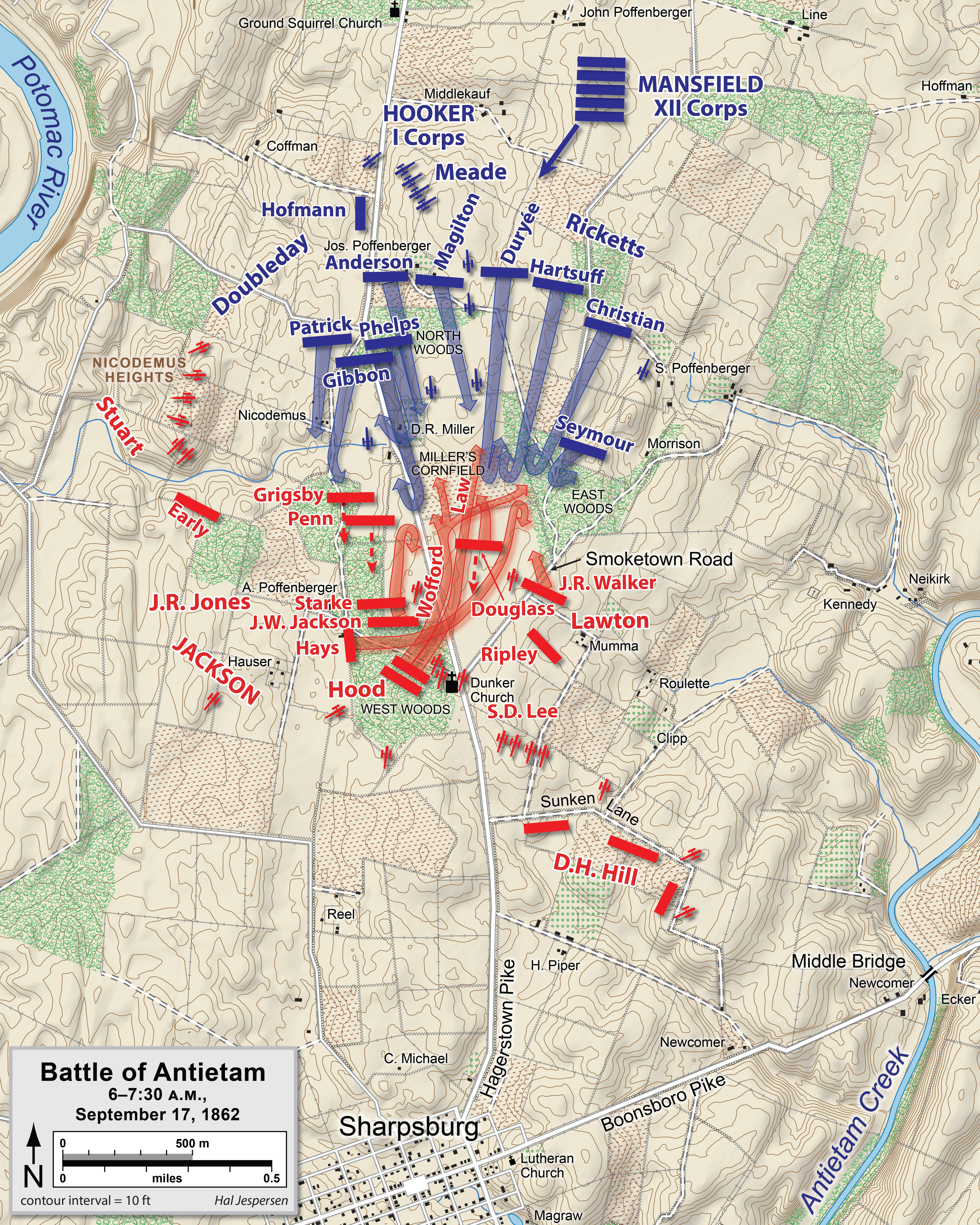
Battle of Antietam, 6 am, 17 Sept. 1862

Soon after being organized, the 7th Louisiana Infantry was ordered to travel to Virginia, where it camped near Manassas. The unit skirmished during the Battle of Blackburn's Ford on 18 July 1861. At the First Battle of Bull Run on 21 July, the regiment was assigned to Colonel Jubal Early's 6th Brigade which sustained a loss of 12 killed and 67 wounded in the battle. It took part in the attack which routed the Union army's right flank, but suffered few casualties. Shortly after the battle, the regiment transferred to the 1st Louisiana Brigade along with the 1st Louisiana Special Battalion and the 6th Louisiana, 8th Louisiana, and 9th Louisiana Infantry Regiments.

In spring 1862, the 1st Louisiana Brigade participated in Jackson's Valley campaign. The brigade was commanded by Brigadier General Richard Taylor and was part of Major General Richard S. Ewell's division. At the Battle of Front Royal on 23 May 1862, it was lightly engaged and had only 2 casualties. Two days later at the First Battle of Winchester the brigade made the decisive assault that defeated their Federal opponents. The brigade struck the Union defenders in the flank and routed them, while sustaining losses of 14 killed and 89 wounded. At the Battle of Cross Keys on 8 June, the regiment was not seriously engaged. On the following day at the Battle of Port Republic, Major General Thomas J. Jackson ordered Taylor's brigade toward the right flank. However, Jackson detached the 7th Louisiana to support the 5th Virginia and 27th Virginia Infantry Regiments on the left flank. The 7th Louisiana numbered about 300 men, so that the three regiments together counted 1,009 soldiers. They were ordered to attack twice that many Union soldiers. In the subsequent fire fight, the 7th Louisiana lost its flag and 159 casualties, including Colonel Hayes badly wounded and its lieutenant colonel (De Choiseul) mortally wounded. De Choiseul died of his wounds on 22 June 1862 and was replaced as lieutenant colonel by Penn, while Captain Terry (Company K) became major.

After joining General Robert E. Lee's army, the 7th Louisiana fought at the Battle of Gaines' Mill on 27 June 1862 and the Battle of Malvern Hill on 1 July. At Gaines' Mill, Taylor was ill and the brigade was led by Colonel Isaac G. Seymour. While crossing Boatswain's Swamp, the brigade became confused and then came under murderous fire and Seymour was killed. As the next brigade advanced, a retreating Louisianan called out, "Boys, you are mighty good but that's hell in there". At Malvern Hill, Ewell's division was in reserve. On 28 July, Taylor was elevated in rank to major general and transferred to lead the District of West Louisiana. Hays was promoted brigadier general on 25 July 1862. On that date, Penn was elevated in rank to colonel, Terry became lieutenant colonel, and Captain J. M. Wilson (Company C) was appointed major. Hays did not recover from his Port Republic wound until September when he finally joined the brigade.

At the Battle of Cedar Mountain on 9 August, Colonel Henry Forno commanded the brigade which consisted of the 6th, 7th, and 8th Louisiana, as before, plus the 5th Louisiana and 14th Louisiana Infantry Regiments. The brigade was lightly engaged and reported only 8 wounded. In the Battle of Kettle Run on 27 August 1862, Forno committed the 5th, 6th, and 8th Louisiana Infantry into action, but apparently not the 7th Louisiana. In the Second Battle of Bull Run on 29–30 August, the brigades of Forno and Early were initially posted on the extreme right of Jackson's defense line. Since Ewell was wounded, his division was led by Brigadier General Alexander R. Lawton. By 4:00 pm on 29 August, the troops of Forno and Early were shifted to Jackson's center where they formed a second line. At this time, a Union attack broke through Lawton's two first line brigades and Forno's brigade helped recapture the position.

The regiment fought at the Battle of Chantilly on 1 September and was present at the Battle of Harper's Ferry on 14 September when the Union garrison surrendered. At the Battle of Antietam on 17 September, Colonel Henry B. Strong led Hays' brigade which was reduced to about 550 effectives. In the battle, the 7th Louisiana lost 6 killed and 63 wounded while the brigade suffered 257 casualties, Between 6:30 and 7:00 am, the 1st Louisiana brigade fought against Union troops advancing south in Miller's cornfield. Strong led the brigade into the cornfield, trying to outflank the Federal attackers. The Louisianans soon found themselves in a crossfire; Strong was killed and the brigade was forced back. At the Battle of Fredericksburg on 13 December, the regiment was held in reserve.

=== 1863 ===
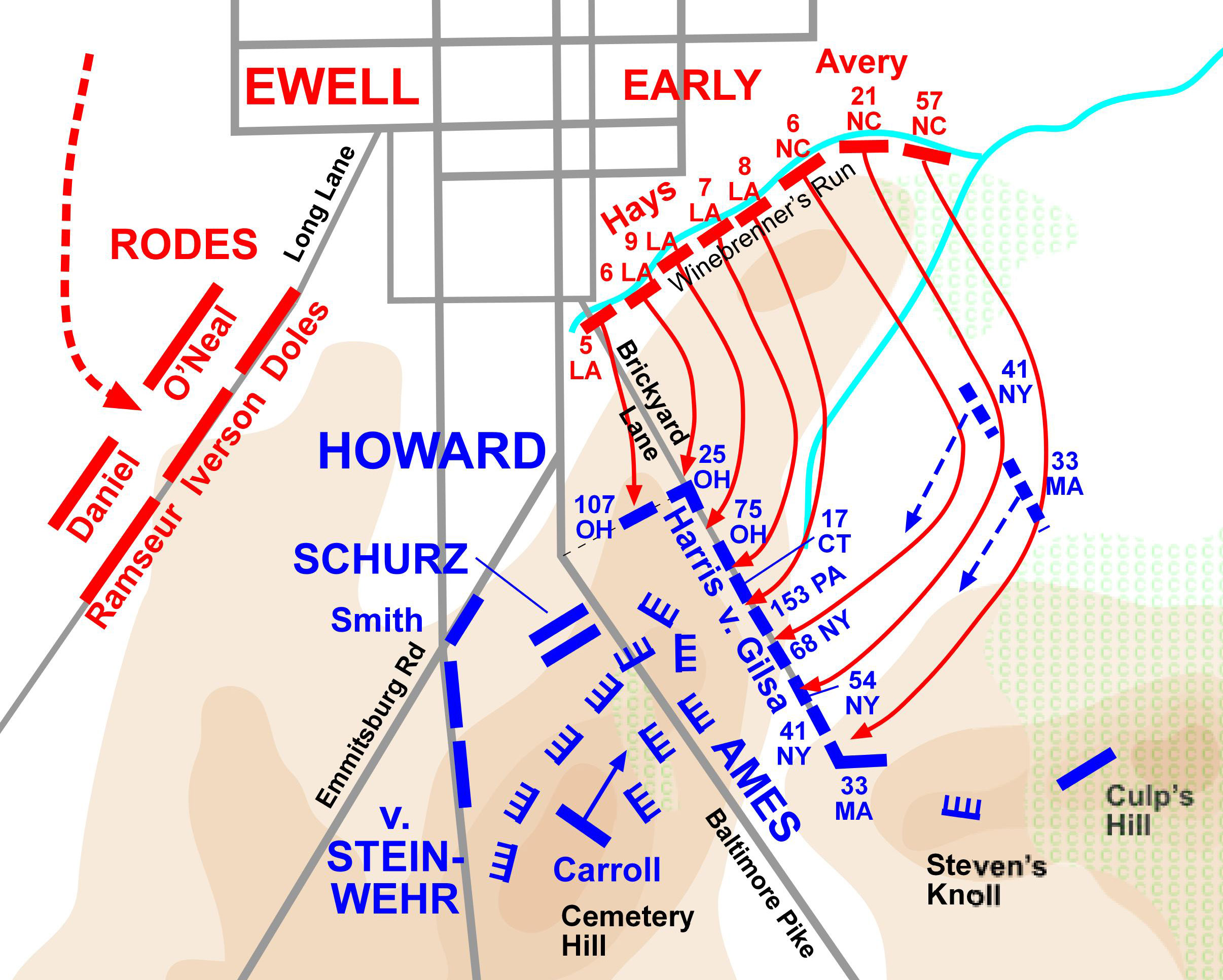
Battle of Gettysburg: 2 July 1863 evening

During the Battle of Chancellorsville on 1–4 May 1863, Hays led the 1st Louisiana Brigade in Early's division. The brigade consisted of the 5th, 6th, 7th, 8th, and 9th Louisiana Infantry. Colonel Penn led the 7th Louisiana and was captured during the fighting. During the Battle of Salem Church on 4 May, the brigades of Hays and Brigadier General Robert Hoke took part in an attack on the isolated Union VI Corps. The assault force broke through the Union front line, but it was routed when it encountered a second line. Hays' brigade suffered 445 casualties, including 129 captured. The 7th Louisiana lost 7 killed, 75 wounded, and 36 missing at Chancellorsville and Salem Church. At the Second Battle of Winchester on 14 June, the regiment captured two cannons in a small redoubt.

The brigade fought on 1 July at the Battle of Gettysburg. The 1st Louisiana Brigade, commanded by Hays, was part of Major General Early's division in Lieutenant General Ewell's Second Corps, Army of Northern Virginia. Hays' brigade went into battle with 1,295 men and sustained 334 casualties. The 7th Louisiana under Penn lost 58 casualties out of 235 men present for duty. In the evening of 2 July, Hays' and Hoke's brigades were ordered to assault the east side of Cemetery Hill. After hand-to-hand fighting, the attackers broke through the Federal defenses in several places and got among the cannons. However, a lack of support and Union reinforcements forced the Confederates to retreat. The regiment saw scant fighting during the Bristoe campaign on 9–22 October.

On 7 November, the Confederate army held the south bank of the Rappahannock River with a bridgehead on the north bank. The bridgehead was defended by the 1st Louisiana Brigade under Colonel Penn. After Union soldiers closed up to the bridgehead at noon on 7 November, Early sent Penn some reinforcements. Lee and Early met and both believed that the bridgehead was secure enough to defend itself until morning. At 5:00 pm that day, in the Second Battle of Rappahannock Station, Union Brigadier General David Allen Russell's VI Corps division stormed the bridgehead and captured the pontoon bridge before most of the Confederates could get away. Together with a minor setback at Kelly's Ford, Confederate losses numbered 2,023, against only 419 Union casualties. The 7th Louisiana Infantry had 180 men captured in the fiasco.

=== 1864–1865 ===
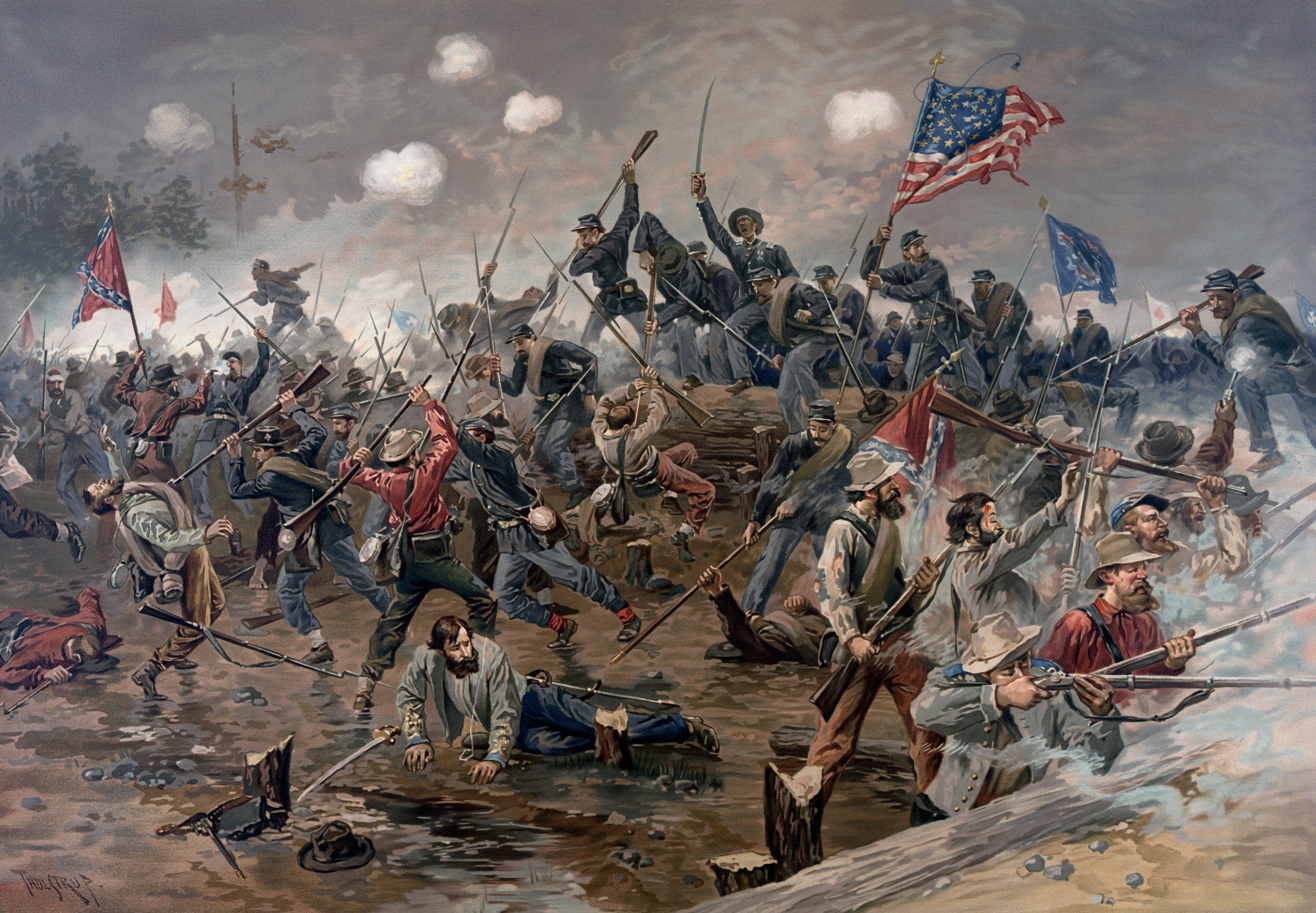
Battle of Spottsylvania

In the Battle of the Wilderness on 5 May 1864, Hays' brigade, still in Early's division, was held in reserve. When Brigadier General Leroy A. Stafford's 2nd Louisiana brigade was routed and Stafford mortally wounded, Hays' brigade filled the gap in the defensive line. Pressing forward in dense woods, Hays' brigade attacked two Union brigades and was mauled. A Virginia regiment that attached itself to Hays' right flank was practically wiped out. Hayes' aide estimated that the 1st Louisiana Brigade lost one-third of its strength. To replace Lieutenant General A. P. Hill, who was sick, Lee transferred Early to command the Third Corps. Lee replaced Early at division command with Brigadier General John B. Gordon. Since Hays outranked Gordon, Lee transferred Hays' brigade to Major General Edward Johnson's division. Hays was assigned to command his own and Stafford's former Louisiana brigade.

Hayes was wounded at the Battle of Spotsylvania on 10 May. His 1st Louisiana Brigade was commanded by Colonel William Monaghan while the 2nd Louisiana Brigade (Stafford's) was led by Colonel Zebulon York. At dawn on 12 May, in a massive assault, the Union II Corps overran an entrenched salient called the Mule Shoe which was defended by Johnson's division. The Federal success was helped by fog and the misfiring of rifles caused by damp gunpowder. The Union attack captured 20 guns and 2,800 men, including Johnson. However, Gordon's division and other troops were able to seal off the breakthrough after heavy fighting. The 7th Louisiana only skirmished at the Battle of Cold Harbor on 2–3 June.

After Cold Harbor, the regiment fought in the Valley campaigns of 1864. At the Battle of Monocacy on 9 July 1864, what remained of Hays' and Stafford's Louisiana brigades were consolidated under the leadership of Brigadier General York in Major General Gordon's division. The brigade fought in the Third Battle of Winchester on 19 September, the Battle of Fisher's Hill on 22 September, and the Battle of Cedar Creek on 19 October. At Cedar Creek, the 5th, 6th, and 7th Louisiana Infantry were so reduced in strength that they were consolidated into a single unit.

During the winter of 1864–1865, the 7th Louisiana served in the trenches in the Siege of Petersburg. In the Appomattox campaign that ended in Lee's final surrender, the regiment was assigned to a brigade led by Colonel Eugene Waggaman, in a division under Brigadier General Clement A. Evans, and in Gordon's Second Corps. At the surrender, only 42 men remained with the 7th Louisiana Infantry. Altogether, 1,077 men enlisted in the regiment of whom 190 were killed in action, 68 died of disease, 2 died in accidents, 1 was executed, and 1 was murdered. There were 53 deserters.

== See also ==
- List of Louisiana Confederate Civil War units
- Louisiana in the Civil War
