= 6th Louisiana Infantry Regiment =

Infantry regiment of the Confederate States Army

- National colors of the "Orleans Rifles" or Company H, 6th Louisiana Infantry Regiment
- Active: 1861–1865
- Allegiance: Confederate States
- Branch: Confederate States Army
- Type: Infantry
- Part of: Army of Northern Virginia
- Engagements: Battle of Front Royal; First Battle of Winchester; Battle of Port Republic; Battle of Gaines Mill; Battle of Kettle Run; Second Battle of Manassas; Battle of Chantilly; Battle of Antietam; Second Battle of Fredericksburg; Battle of Salem Church; Second Battle of Winchester; Battle of Gettysburg; Bristoe campaign; Second Battle of Rappahannock Station; Battle of the Wilderness; Battle of Spotsylvania Court House; Valley campaigns of 1864; Siege of Petersburg; Battle of Hatcher's Run; Battle of Fort Stedman; Battle of Appomattox Court House

The 6th Louisiana Infantry Regiment served in the Confederate States Army during the American Civil War. It was part of the Louisiana Tigers. Formed in June 1861 at Camp Moore, it fought in Jackson's Valley campaign, the Battle of Gaines Mill, the Second Battle of Bull Run and its related actions, and the Battle of Antietam in 1862. The next year, it fought at the Second Battle of Fredericksburg, the Battle of Salem Church, the Second Battle of Winchester, and the Battle of Gettysburg before being overrun at the Second Battle of Rappahannock Station. It spent 1864 fighting in Grant's Overland campaign and with Jubal Early in the Valley campaigns of 1864. The regiment fought in the Battle of Hatcher's Run and the Battle of Fort Stedman in early 1865 before surrendering after the Battle of Appomattox Court House in April. It began its service with 916 men and ended with 52.

== Service history ==
=== 1861 ===
The regiment was organized into Confederate service for action in the American Civil War on 4 June 1861, at Camp Moore in the state of Louisiana. Its 916 men were organized into 10 companies designated with the letters A–I and K. Most of the companies were organized in Orleans Parish, although Company D was from Tensas Parish, Company C from St. Landry Parish, and Company A from Union Parish and Sabine Parish. The unit's first colonel was Isaac Seymour, its first lieutenant colonel was Louis Lay, and its first major was Samuel L. James. Nearly 60 percent of the men were either Irish immigrants or were of Irish ancestry. At least 196 other men from the regiment were born outside of the United States, particularly Germans. Around two-thirds of the men whose places of birth are known were immigrants to the United States. Companies B, F, and I were predominantly Irish, with heavy concentrations of Irishmen in companies K, H, and E as well. A majority of company G were Germans. In its early days, the unit had a reputation for being disorderly and hard to control; Seymour had to publicly rebuke several officers in late 1861 for drunkenness.

The regiment left Camp Moore on 9 and 11 June, sent to the fighting in Virginia. The men arrived at their destination on 14 and 16 June, and were stationed at Centreville, as part of a brigade commanded by Brigadier General Richard Ewell. The 6th Louisiana saw its first combat on 18 July, in a skirmish at Fairfax Station. This skirmish also result in the 6th's first battle death, as a soldier was killed in a friendly fire incident. The regiment guarded supplies and was not involved in the First Battle of Bull Run on 21 July. In August, it was added to a brigade commanded by W. H. T. Walker consisting of the 7th Louisiana Infantry Regiment, the 8th Louisiana Infantry Regiment, the 9th Louisiana Infantry Regiment, and the 1st Louisiana Special Battalion. The brigade spent the next winter in the vicinity of Centreville, and Orange Court House.

The period after the fighting at Bull Run was plagued by inactivity, boredom, and drunkenness among the regiment's men. In August 1861, about a third of the regiment's men landed on the sick list, with diarrhea being the most common compliant. Aside from a scouting mission to the Great Falls of the Potomac, the regiment was inactive. Nine weeks after Walker took command, he was replaced by Louisianan Richard Taylor. Early March saw the Confederates withdraw from the Manassas area, and the regiment took up a new camp along the Rappahannock River. On 18 April, the regiment marched to the Gordonsville area, before moving west into the Shenandoah Valley ten days later to serve under Major General Stonewall Jackson, as part of a division commanded by Ewell. James resigned on 1 December 1861, and was replaced by George W. Christy. Lay resigned on 13 February.

=== With Jackson in the Shenandoah Valley ===
The Confederate government passed a law extending the enlistment term of soldiers from one year to the remainder of the war. This led to a reorganization of the regiment, including new elections for officers. Seymour initially planned on resigning rather than standing for re-election, but changed his mind after it became clear to him that the men of the regiment wished for him to continue as colonel. The 9 May election resulted in Seymour being retained as colonel, Henry Strong being elected as lieutenant colonel, and Arthur McArthur replacing Christy as major. As part of an offensive strike by Jackson to prevent Union troops from leaving the Shenanodah Valley, Jackson's men marched towards action. Leaving Conrad's Store on 19 May, the 6th Louisiana and Taylor's brigade separated from the rest of Ewell's division, marching to New Market and then towards Luray, where it rejoined Ewell's division and Jackson concentrated his forces. On 23 May, the regiment saw action in the Battle of Front Royal, as Jackson attacked an isolated Union outpost. The 6th Louisiana supported the initial Confederate attack, and later in the fighting was called upon to charge a battery; the battery was withdrawn before the charge could be made.

On 24 May, Union troops abandoned Strasburg and retreated to Winchester. Jackson ordered Ewell to advance on the direct route from Front Royal to Winchester, while Jackson and another part of the army, including Taylor's brigade, moved via Cedarville to strike the road from Strasburg to Winchester at Middletown, with hopes of cutting off part of the Union column. After a skirmish at Middletown, Jackson cut off a portion of the Union troops, and the 6th Louisiana captured two Union battle flags. 25 May saw the regiment engaged in the First Battle of Winchester, where Jackson ordered Taylor's brigade to charge a ridge on the Union right, from which Union artillery had been firing on the Confederate line. The attack succeeded, Jackson ordered charges by more of his army, and the Union forces were swept from the field. The 6th Louisiana suffered five men killed, including Major McArthur, a further 39 wounded, and three missing in action. Nathaniel G. Offutt replaced McArthur as major the next day.

Multiple Union columns concentrated against Jackson's army in a pincer movement, and on 30 May Jackson decided to withdraw. The next day, Taylor's brigade began to march toward Staunton. 1 June saw the 6th Louisiana engaged in some fighting as Ewell skirmished near Strasburg with a Union force led by John C. Fremont. The regiment spent the night of 1/2 June as Taylor's rear guard, and at least 52 men of the regiment were captured during the fighting retreat through Strasburg and Woodstock. Straggling was endemic during the retreat. The Battle of Cross Keys was fought by a portion of Jackson's command on 8 June. Before the 6th Louisiana was engaged at Cross Keys, Taylor's brigade was sent to Port Republic to counter a Union cavalry strike. The threat at Port Republic had ended by the time that Taylor's brigade arrived, and the brigade marched back to the Cross Keys battlefield. The 6th Louisiana was sent to the Confederate right, where it was not directly engaged in the action, but it came under protracted artillery fire, which killed one man. Some of the men of the regiment engaged in looting the dead on the field; this incident contributed to the regiment's reputation for disorderliness.

On the morning of 9 June, the regiment marched back to Port Republic. Taylor's brigade crossed a rickety bridge; Jackson's men were engaging Union troops in the Battle of Port Republic. The majority of Taylor's brigade was sent to the right of the battlefield through heavy woods to assault a Union artillery position on a prominence known as the Coaling. The 6th Louisiana formed on the left of Taylor's line facing the Coaling; this position provided the 6th Louisiana less cover than what the other regiments in Taylor's line had. After an order by Taylor, the Louisiana brigade charged, screaming the rebel yell. Vicious hand-to-hand fighting took place on the Coaling. The fighting became a seesaw action of attacks and counterattacks; the Confederates took final possession of all but one guns on their third attack. The Union commander withdrew his forces, and the Confederates held the field. The 6th Louisiana suffered more casualties than the other regiments of Taylor's brigade that had charged the Coaling. According to official reports, the regiment had 11 men killed and 55 wounded, although other records report 18 or 23 men killed or wounded.

=== Seven Days through Antietam ===
After a time to rest, the brigade was sent east out of the Shenadoah Valley to the Richmond area, as Jackson's men were sent to reinforce General Robert E. Lee's Confederate army which was defending the Confederate capital. Taylor was on leave, so Seymour was in temporary command of the brigade. The 6th Louisiana skirmished at Hundley's Corner on 26 June before fighting in the Battle of Gaines Mill the next day. The Louisianans, known as the Louisiana Tigers, became bogged down in Boatswain's Swamp, were repulsed with loss, and withdrew from the battle. Seymour was killed during the charge, and was replaced by Strong. Offutt took over Strong's position as lieutenant colonel, and William Monaghan became colonel.

Moving north with Jackson in August, it fought at Bristoe Station, Virginia on 26 August, in the Battle of Kettle Run the next day. At Kettle Run, the regiment held off a Union advance while the 8th Louisiana burned a bridge, and then the two regiments, joined by the 60th Georgia Infantry Regiment and the 5th Louisiana Infantry Regiment, fought against the Union Excelsior Brigade and the brigade of Colonel Joseph B. Carr. It then fought in the Second Battle of Bull Run on 29 and 30 August. At Second Bull Run, it was part of the brigade of Colonel Henry Forno. On the first day of the battle, Forno's brigade helped repulse James Nagle's Union brigade. On the morning on 30 August, it was sent to the rear for supplies and would not rejoin the fighting that day.

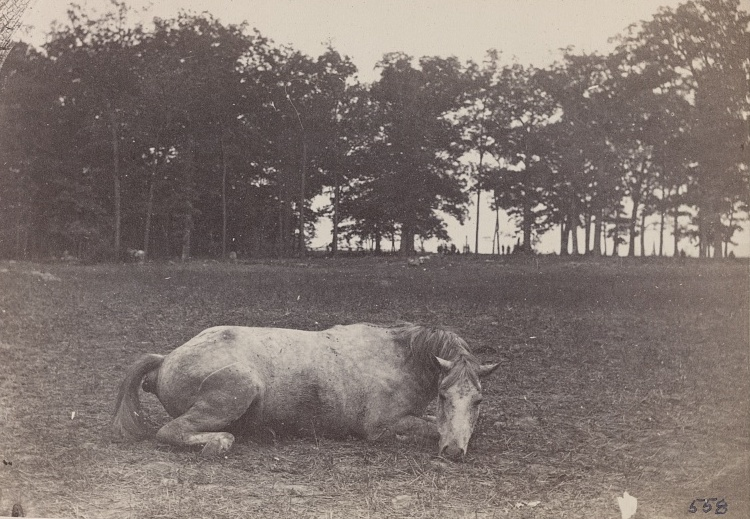
Dead Confederate horse after Antietam. The horse is believed to have belonged to Colonel Strong.

After Second Bull Run, the 6th Louisiana fought in the Battle of Chantilly on 1 September, where the Louisiana brigade was routed with the 5th, 6th, 8th, and 14th Louisiana regiments suffering the heaviest casualties in the Confederate army, and on 17 September saw action in the Battle of Antietam. At Antietam, the regiment was part of Harry T. Hays's brigade. During the fighting, Hays's brigade charged towards the Miller Cornfield and was cut to pieces, with the brigade suffering 61 percent casualties. The 6th Louisiana lost 52 men killed or wounded, including Colonel Strong, who was killed and replaced with Offutt. All 12 officers of the 6th Louisiana that saw action at Antietam were killed or wounded. Monaghan became lieutenant colonel and was replaced as major by Joseph Hanlon. Offutt in turn resigned on 7 November, and was replaced by Monaghan. Hanlon became lieutenant colonel, and Manning was promoted to major. The regiment was held in reserve at the Battle of Fredericksburg on 13 December and was not directly engaged, although it did come under Union artillery fire.

=== 1863 ===
An inspection in January 1863 rated the 6th Louisiana as having "poor" discipline and moderately good at performance in drills. Along with the 5th Louisiana Infantry, the regiment contested a Union crossing of the Rappahannock River on 29 April 1863. Union troops were able to force a crossing, and the 6th Louisiana had 7 men killed, 12 wounded, and 78 captured. It then fought in the Second Battle of Fredericksburg on 3 May, where 27 of the unit's men were captured. While part of the regiment was captured, most of the unit was able to withdraw from the field in better condition than the other Confederate units positioned near it. It then fought at the Battle of Salem Church the next day. Altogether, the 6th Louisiana Infantry sustained losses of 14 killed, 68 wounded, and 99 captured at the Battle of Chancellorsville. It next saw combat on 14 June, in the Second Battle of Winchester, where it joined its brigade of other Louisiana units in capturing a Union fort.

At the Battle of Gettysburg on 1–3 July, the 6th Louisiana was still in Hays' brigade. On 1 July, the brigade was part of a Confederate charge that swept the Union XI Corps from the field, although it was less heavily engaged than some of the other participating Confederate brigades. Entering the town of Gettysburg, the brigade captured large numbers of disorganized Union troops. On the evening of the following day, the brigade was part of a failed attack against the Union position on Cemetery Hill. It then spent 3 July, the final day of the battle, skirmishing. The Confederates, who were defeated at Gettysburg, withdrew from the field on 4 July. The regiment took 232 men into the fighting at Gettysburg, and suffered 61 casualties.

=== 1864 and 1865 ===
Back in Virginia, the 6th Louisiana fought in the Bristoe campaign in October and was overrun in the Second Battle of Rappahannock Station on 7 November, losing 89 men captured. In the spring of 1864, it fought in Grant's Overland campaign. On 5 May, in the Battle of the Wilderness, the regiment helped repulse a Union attack, after Hays' brigade had been repulsed and badly bloodied earlier in the battle. It then fought in the Battle of Spotsylvania Court House on 9 May through 19. On 12 May, the regiment was part of its brigade's fighting at the Mule Shoe. The brigade was badly wrecked at the Mule Shoe, and only 60 men were present at the 6th Louisiana's roll call the next morning. From June through October, it was detached as part of Jubal Early's command to fight in the Valley campaigns of 1864. Monaghan was killed in battle on 28 August, or 25 August, and was not replaced as colonel. At the Battle of Cedar Creek in October, one company of the 6th Louisiana saw both men present shot. After the battle, the 5th, 6th, and 7th were consolidated into a single company when the brigade was reorganized due to severe losses. Taking part in the Siege of Petersburg, the 6th Louisiana's survivors fought at the Battle of Hatcher's Run on 6 February 1865, and at the Battle of Fort Stedman on 25 March. The 6th Louisiana's remnants ended their military service when Robert E. Lee's Confederate army surrendered on 9 April, after the Battle of Appomattox Court House. At the time of the surrender, the 6th Louisiana had been reduced to 52 officers and men. Over the course of its existence, 1,146 men served in the unit. Of that total, 219 were combat deaths, 104 died of disease, one man drowned, five died accidentally, one man was executed, and at least 232 deserted. Desertions were particularly heavy in three companies that primary consisted of men born outside of the United States.

== Sources ==
- Bergeron, Arthur W. (1996) [1989]. Guide to Louisiana Confederate Military Units, 1861–1865 (Louisiana Paperback ed.). Baton Rouge, Louisiana: Louisiana State University. ISBN 0-8071-2102-9.
- Busey, John W.; Martin, David G. (2005) [1982]. Regimental Strengths and Losses at Gettysburg. Hightstown, New Jersey: Longstreet House. ISBN 0-944413-67-6.
- Furgurson, Ernest B. (1993) [1992]. Chancellorsville 1863: The Souls of the Brave. New York: Vintage Books. ISBN 978-0-679-72831-3.
- Gannon, James P. (1998). Irish Rebels, Confederate Tigers: A History of the 6th Louisiana Volunteers, 1861–1865. Campbell, California: Savas Publishing Company. ISBN 1-882810-16-3.
- Gottfried, Bradley M. (2012) [2002]. The Brigades of Gettysburg: The Union and Confederate Brigades at the Battle of Gettysburg. New York: Skyhorse. ISBN 978-1-61608-401-1.
- Hennessy, John J. (1994) [1993]. Return to Bull Run: The Campaign and Battle of Second Manassas. New York: Touchstone. ISBN 0-671-88989-3.
- Krick, Robert K. (1996). Conquering the Valley: Stonewall Jackson at Port Republic. New York: William Morrow and Company. ISBN 0-688-11282-X.
- Jones, Terry L. (1987). Lee's Tigers: The Louisiana Infantry in the Army of Northern Virginia. Baton Rouge, Louisiana: Louisiana State University Press. ISBN 0-8071-1314-X.
- Rhea, Gordon C. (1994). The Battle of the Wilderness May 5-6, 1864. Baton Rouge, Louisiana: Louisiana State University Press. ISBN 0-8071-1873-7.
- Robertson, James I. (1997). Stonewall Jackson: The Man, the Soldier, the Legend. New York: MacMillan. ISBN 0-02-864685-1.
- Sears, Stephen W. (1992). To the Gates of Richmond: The Peninsula Campaign. New York: Ticknor & Fields. ISBN 0-89919-790-6.
- Sears, Stephen W. (1996). Chancellorsville. Boston/New York: Mariner Books. ISBN 978-0-395-87744-9.
- Sears, Stephen W. (2003) [1983]. Landscape Turned Red: The Battle of Antietam. Boston/New York: Mariner Books. ISBN 0-618-34419-5.
