= 9th Louisiana Infantry Regiment =

Infantry regiment of the Confederate States Army

9th Louisiana Infantry Regiment (Confederate)
- The Army of Northern Virginia's flag
- Active: July 6, 1861 – April 9, 1865
- Country: Confederate States
- Branch: Confederate States Army
- Type: Infantry
- Size: Regiment
- Part of: Army of Northern Virginia
- Garrison/HQ: Camp Moore Louisiana
- Nickname: Louisiana Tigers or Iron Brigade
- Equipment: Rifles & Carbines; M1861 Springfield Rifle; M1855 Springfield Rifle; Enfield Rifle; Mississippi Rifle; Lorenz Rifle
- Engagements: Battle of Somerville Heights; Battle of Front Royal; Battle of Middletown; First Battle of Winchester; Battle of Mount Carmel; Battle of Cross Keys; Battle of Port Republic; Battle of Cold Harbor; Battle of Marven Hill; Battle of Cedar Mountain; Battle of Bristoe Station; First Battle of Manassas; Battle of Chartilly; Battle of Harper's Ferry; Battle of Antietam; Battle of Fredericksburg; Battle of Chancellorsville; Battle of Maryes Heights; Battle of Salem Church; Second Battle of Winchester; Battle of Gettysburg; Battle of Raccoon Ford; Battle of Mine Run; Battle of Rappahannock; Battle of the Wilderness; Battle of Spotsylvania; Battle of Hanover Junction

Commanders
- Notable commanders: Lt. Gen. Richard Taylor; Brig. Gen. Leroy Augustus Stafford; Lt. Gen. Stonewall Jackson; Col. William R. Peck

The 9th Louisiana Infantry Regiment or Louisiana Tigers was the common nickname for certain infantry troops from the state of Louisiana in the Confederate States Army during the American Civil War. Originally applied to a specific company, the nickname expanded to a battalion, then to a brigade, and eventually to all Louisiana troops within the Army of Northern Virginia. Although the exact composition of the Louisiana Tigers changed as the war progressed, they developed a reputation as fearless, hard-fighting shock troops.

== The original Louisiana Tigers ==
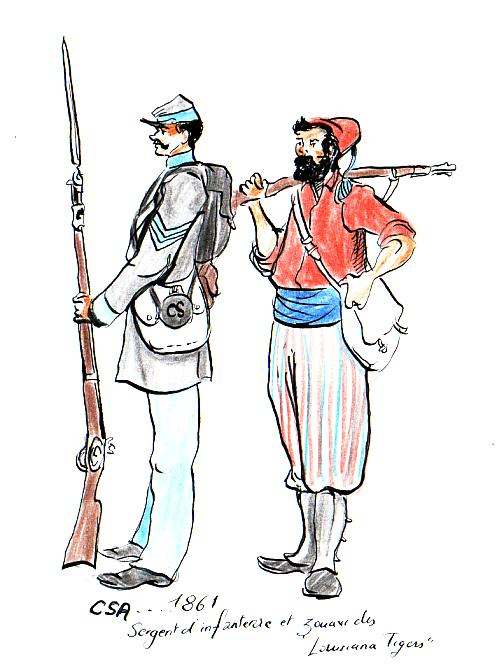
Infantry Sgt and Tiger Zouave

The origin of the term came from the "Tiger Rifles," a volunteer company raised in the New Orleans area as part of Major Chatham Roberdeau Wheat's 1st Special battalion, Louisiana infantry. A large number of the men were foreign-born, particularly Irish Americans, many from the city's wharves and docks. Many men had previous military experience in local militia units or as filibusters. They (and the regiments that later became known as the Tigers) were organized and trained at Camp Moore.

Originally, Company B of Wheat's Tigers wore distinctive uniforms similar to the French zouave, with straw hats or red cloth fezzes, blue-striped chasseur-style pants, and short dark blue jackets with red lacing or tombeaux. As time went on, this garb was replaced by Confederate uniforms and what clothing the men could purchase or otherwise obtain from civilians. Within months of arriving in Northern Virginia, Wheat's entire five-company battalion began to be called the Louisiana Tigers. The battalion first saw combat during the First Battle of Manassas, where it anchored the left flank on Matthews Hill for several hours until reinforcements arrived.

In early 1862, Wheat's Tigers were assigned to Brig. Gen. Richard Taylor's First Louisiana Brigade in the army of Stonewall Jackson. They participated in his 1862 Valley Campaign, proving instrumental in Confederate victories at the battles of Front Royal, Winchester, and Port Republic.

In late spring, Jackson's force was sent eastward to participate in the Peninsula Campaign. Following Wheat's death at the Battle of Gaines' Mill, his battalion was merged with the 1st (Coppens') Louisiana Zouave Battalion. The combined unit took heavy casualties during the Northern Virginia Campaign and the subsequent Maryland Campaign, where its leader, Lieutenant Colonel Georges Augustus Gaston De Coppens, was killed. The depleted battalion was transferred from the Army of Northern Virginia after the Battle of Fredericksburg. It served in various districts until it was finally disbanded in December 1864.

== Hays' Brigade ==
By then, the nickname "Louisiana Tigers" had expanded to encompass the entire brigade, which was commanded by Brig. Gen. Harry T. Hays following Taylor's promotion and transfer to the Western Theater. By the Battle of Fredericksburg in late 1862, Hays' Brigade was composed of the 5th, 6th, 7th, 8th, and 9th Louisiana, and was a part of the division of Maj. Gen. Jubal A. Early.

During the 1863 Gettysburg campaign, Hays' Brigade played a crucial role in the Confederate victory at the Second Battle of Winchester, seizing a key fort and forcing the withdrawal of Union troops under Maj. Gen. Robert H. Milroy. During the subsequent invasion of southern Pennsylvania, much of the populace feared the thievery and drunkenness often associated with the colorful Louisianans. At the Battle of Gettysburg, Hays' Brigade stormed East Cemetery Hill on the second day and seized several Union artillery pieces before withdrawing when supporting units were not advanced.

In the autumn of 1863, more than half the brigade was captured at the Battle of Rappahannock Station, and 1,600 men were shipped to Northern prisoner-of-war camps, many to Fort Delaware. Most would be paroled and would later rejoin the Tigers. The replenished brigade fought in the Overland Campaign at the Battle of the Wilderness and the Battle of Spotsylvania Court House, where General Hays was severely wounded.

== Final organization ==
During the subsequent reorganization of Robert E. Lee's army in late May, the much depleted brigade of Tigers was consolidated with the "Pelican Brigade," formally known as the Second Louisiana Brigade, which had also lost its commander, Leroy A. Stafford, a long-time Tiger. Zebulon York became the new commander.

The nickname Tigers came to encompass all Louisiana infantry troops that fought under Lee. Nearly 12,000 men served at one time or another in various regiments that were destined to be part of the Louisiana Tigers. The name was at times also used for other Louisiana troops, including Levi's Light Artillery Battery and Maurin's Battery, but it was the infantry that is most often associated with the term.

York's consolidated brigade of Tigers fought in Early's army during the Battle of Monocacy and several subsequent battles in the Shenandoah Valley. In late 1864, the Tigers returned to the Army of Northern Virginia in the trenches around Petersburg, Virginia. By the Appomattox Campaign, many regiments were reduced to less than 100 men apiece, and Brig. Gen. William R. Peck had become the Tigers' final commander.

== Postbellum ==
Following the Civil War, many former Tigers joined the Hays Brigade Relief Association, a prominent New Orleans social and political organization. Harry T. Hays, by then the local sheriff, mobilized the association during the 1866 New Orleans Race Riot. A company of former Louisiana Tigers joined the Fenian Invasion of Upper Canada on June 1, 1866, and fought the Canadian militia the next day at the Battle of Ridgeway.

The nickname Louisiana "Tigers" lives on with the athletic teams of the Louisiana State University.

== See also ==
- List of Louisiana Confederate Civil War units
- Louisiana Tigers
