= 8th Louisiana Infantry Regiment =

Infantry regiment of the Confederate States Army

8th Louisiana Infantry Regiment (Confederate)
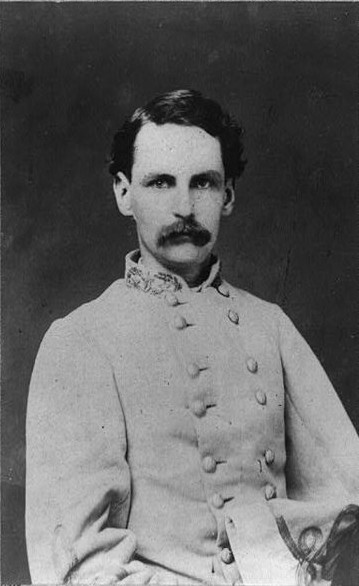
- Lieutenant Colonel Francis T. Nicholls of the 8th Louisiana was later promoted brigadier general.
- Active: 15 June 1861 – 9 April 1865
- Country: Confederate States of America
- Allegiance: Confederate States of America, Louisiana
- Branch: Confederate States Army
- Type: Infantry
- Size: Regiment (889 men, June 1861)
- Part of: 1st Louisiana Brigade (Taylor's and Hays')
- Engagements: American Civil War; Battle of Front Royal (1862); First Battle of Winchester (1862); Battle of Cross Keys (1862); Battle of Port Republic (1862); Battle of Gaines' Mill (1862); Battle of Malvern Hill (1862); Second Battle of Bull Run (1862); Battle of Chantilly (1862); Battle of Antietam (1862); Battle of Fredericksburg (1862); Battle of Chancellorsville (1863); Second Battle of Winchester (1863); Battle of Gettysburg (1863); Second Battle of Rappahannock Station (1863); Battle of the Wilderness (1864); Battle of Spotsylvania (1864); Battle of Cold Harbor (1864); Battle of Monocacy (1864); Second Battle of Kernstown (1864); Third Battle of Winchester (1864); Battle of Fisher's Hill (1864); Battle of Cedar Creek (1864); Siege of Petersburg (1864–65); Battle of Appomattox (1865)

Commanders
- Notable commanders: Trevanian D. Lewis †; Alcibiades DeBlanc

The 8th Louisiana Infantry Regiment was a unit of volunteers recruited in Louisiana that fought in the Confederate States Army during the American Civil War. Formed in June 1861, the regiment was sent to fight in the Eastern Theater of the American Civil War. Joining a brigade of Louisiana regiments, it fought in Jackson's Valley campaign and at Gaines' Mill, Malvern Hill, Second Bull Run, Antietam, and Fredericksburg in 1862. The regiment served at Chancellorsville, Second Winchester, Gettysburg in 1863. At Rappahannock Station in November 1863, most of the regiment was captured. The unit fought at the Wilderness, Spotsylvania, Cold Harbor, and the Valley campaigns of 1864. It served at Petersburg starting in December 1864 and surrendered at Appomattox in April 1865.

== Formation ==
The 8th Louisiana Infantry Regiment formed at Camp Moore on 15 June 1861 with 889 recruits. The field officers were Colonel Henry B. Kelly, Lieutenant Colonel Francis T. Nicholls, and Major John B. Prados. When the soldiers elected new officers on 7 May 1862, Prados was dropped and Trevanian D. Lewis became major. On 24 June 1862, Nicholls was named colonel of the 15th Louisiana Infantry Regiment and promoted brigadier general on 14 October 1862. Lewis became lieutenant colonel and Alcibiades DeBlanc became major on 2 July 1862. Kelly was appointed judge of a military court on 6 April 1863 and was replaced as colonel by Lewis. On that date, DeBlanc became lieutenant colonel and German A. Lester became major.

Company information for the 8th Louisiana Infantry Regiment
Company	Nickname	Captains	Recruitment Parish
A	Creole Guards	Leon J. Fremaux (r); Antoine L. Gusman	East Baton Rouge
B	Bienville Rifles	Augustin Larose (x); Robert Current (k-Antietam); Louis Prados	Orleans
C	Attakapas Guards	Alcibiades LeBlanc (p); Charles Duchamp	St. Martin
D	Sumter Guards	Francis Newman (r); Frank M. Harney (p); John B. Hereford (r); William Cooper	Orleans
E	Franklin Sharpshooters	German A. Lester (p); Newton Z. Guice (k-2nd Kernstown)	Franklin
F	Opelousas Guards	James C. Pratt (x); Albert Dejean (k-2nd Winchester); E. Sumter Taylor	St. Landry
G	Minden Blues	John Langdon Lewis (r); Benjamin F. Simms (d); Samuel Y. Webb	Claiborne
H	Cheneyville Rifles	Patrick F. Keary	Rapides
I	Rapides Invincibles	Lee Crandall (p); William K. Johnson	Rapides
K	Phoenix Company	Lawrence D. Nicholls (k-Gaines' Mill); Victor St. Martin (k-Gettysburg); William Simms	Ascension

- Key: d = died, k = killed, p = promoted, r = resigned, x = dropped 24 April 1862.

== Service ==
=== 1861–1862 ===
Battle of Port Republic, 9 June 1862

On 17 July 1861, the first 6 companies of the regiment arrived at Manassas, Virginia, but they were tasked to guard supplies and missed the First Battle of Bull Run on 21 July. Soon thereafter, the regiment was assigned to the 1st Louisiana Brigade, joining the 1st Louisiana Special Battalion and the 6th Louisiana, 7th Louisiana, and 9th Louisiana Infantry Regiments. The brigade spent the winter of 1861–1862 in northern Virginia before joining Major General Thomas J. Jackson's small army in Jackson's Valley campaign during the spring. The regiment saw action at the Battle of Front Royal on 23 May 1862. When the retreating Union force set the railroad bridge in fire, Colonel Kelly led his men across it. Reaching a second stream spanned by a burning wagon bridge, Kelly led a group of soldiers across a ford then ordered his men to put out the flames, which they did. The Louisiana brigade was led by Brigadier General Richard Taylor and was part of Major General Richard S. Ewell's division.

On 25 May 1862, the 8th Louisiana Infantry was lightly engaged during the First Battle of Winchester. Some of the regiment's soldiers were captured by Union troops on 30 May while guarding supplies at Front Royal, Virginia. After seeing "limited action" at the Battle of Cross Keys on 8 June, the regiment was in the thick of the action at the Battle of Port Republic the following day. As Taylor's brigade moved into action, the 7th Louisiana was detached and the 8th Louisiana was the brigade's leading unit. During the battle, Taylor's brigade swung wide to the right, through a forest, and attacked a position known as the Coaling. The Louisianans overran a Union artillery battery, were driven back, and recaptured the guns in a second charge. After the war Taylor remarked he had, "never seen so many dead and wounded in the same limited space", as he saw at the Coaling.

The regiment fought at the Battle of Gaines' Mill on 27 June 1862. Taylor was ill, so the brigade was led by Colonel Isaac G. Seymour. General Robert E. Lee, commander of the Army of Northern Virginia ordered Ewell to attack, so Ewell sent in the first brigade that appeared, which was Seymour's. Under the inexperienced Seymour, the brigade became disordered while crossing Boatswain's Swamp. Seymour was killed and when Major Chatham Roberdeau Wheat of the 1st Louisiana Special Battalion tried to lead the attack, Wheat was also killed. The Louisianans' attack stalled. Captain Nicholls (K Company) was killed at Gaines' Mill.

On 27 August 1862, the 8th Louisiana Infantry was embroiled in action at Kettle Run. Together with the 6th Louisiana, Ewell tried to ambush Major General Joseph Hooker's Union division. Ewell's outnumbered troops were able to slip away after inflicting 300 casualties on their opponents. At the Second Battle of Bull Run on 28–30 August, the brigade was led by Colonel Henry Forno and consisted of the 5th, 6th, 7th, 8th, and 14th Louisiana Infantry Regiments. On 29 August at 5:30 pm, the 8th Louisiana Infantry joined Brigadier General Jubal Early's brigade in a counterattack that defeated a major Federal assault. The regiment was engaged at the Battle of Chantilly on 1 September.

At the Battle of Antietam on 17 September 1862, the 8th Louisiana Infantry suffered 103 casualties according to one account, or 91 casualties (7 killed, 84 wounded) according to a second account. The 1st Louisiana brigade still belonged to Ewell's division, except that the division commander at Antietam was Brigadier General Alexander R. Lawton. The Louisiana brigade was led by Colonel H. B. Strong and fought in Miller's cornfield about 7 am. Lawton's division took 3,400 men into battle and suffered 1,334 casualties. Strong's brigade sustained losses of at least 41 killed and 216 wounded out of about 550 engaged. (Note: The 14th Louisiana did not report its losses at Antietam.) Captain Current (B Company) was killed at Antietam. The regiment was in reserve at the Battle of Fredericksburg on 13 December.

=== 1863–1865 ===
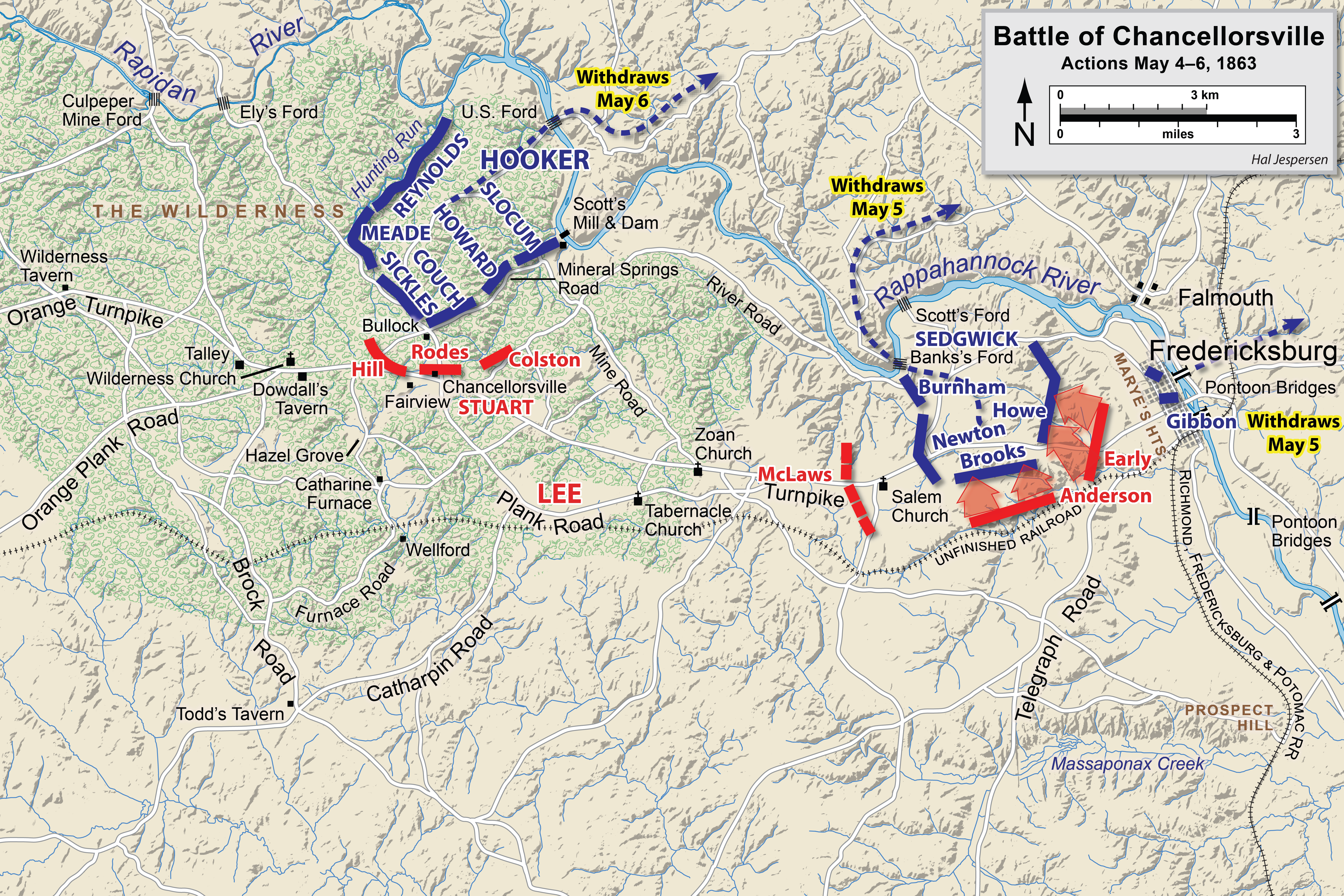
Battle of Chancellorsville, 4–6 May 1863, shows the action at Salem Church at right.

At the Battle of Chancellorsville, the 8th Louisiana Infantry was assigned to Brigadier General Harry T. Hays' brigade in Early's division and suffered losses of 17 killed, 64 wounded, and 89 missing. The other units in the brigade were the 5th, 6th, 7th, and 9th Louisiana Infantry Regiments. After a Union attack captured Marye's Heights on 3 May, Hays' brigade was able to escape with only the loss of 27 stragglers. On 4 May at Salem Church, the brigades of Hays and Brigadier General Robert Hoke attacked and broke through the first Union line. Without warning, the attackers encountered a Vermont brigade in the second line and were routed. Hays' brigade lost 445 casualties, including 129 prisoners swept up in a Union counterattack.

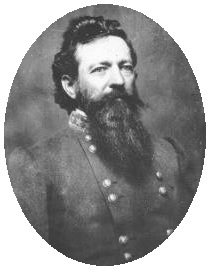
Harry T. Hays

Captain Dejean (Company F) was killed on 14 June 1863 at the Second Battle of Winchester. At the Battle of Gettysburg on 1–3 July, the 8th Louisiana Infantry took 296 soldiers into action and sustained 75 casualties. It was in Hays' brigade, Early's division, Ewell's Second Corps, Army of Northern Virginia. Hays' brigade lost 334 out of 1,295 men in the battle. On 1 July, the regiment helped rout Federal defenders near Gettysburg, and on 2 July it took part in an attack on Cemetery Hill during which it lost its flag. Colonel Lewis was killed on 2 July and replaced as colonel by Deblanc, while Lester became lieutenant colonel. Captain St. Martin (K Company) was also killed on 2 July. The Cemetery Hill attack was carried out at dusk by the brigades of Hays and Colonel Isaac E. Avery. The Confederates broke through the Union line at the Brickyard Lane and got among some Union batteries posted on the hill. A soldier from the 8th Louisiana reported there was hand-to-hand fighting at the stone wall bordering the lane. Early declined to send supporting troops and Union counterattacks soon ousted the Confederates from the position. Avery was killed.

The regiment participated in the Bristoe campaign on 9–22 October 1863. On 7 November, the Confederate army was deployed on the south bank of the Rappahannock River with a bridgehead on the north bank. The bridgehead was held by the 1st Louisiana brigade under Colonel D. B. Penn. At noon on 7 November, Union troops came into contact with the bridgehead, so Early sent Penn some reinforcements. Lee and Early both agreed that the bridgehead was strong enough to defend itself until morning. However, at 5 pm, in the Second Battle of Rappahannock Station, Union Brigadier General David Allen Russell's division successfully stormed the bridgehead and seized the pontoon bridge before the bulk of its defenders could escape. Including a minor setback at Kelly's Ford, Confederate losses numbered 2,023, while there were only 419 Federal casualties. The 8th Louisiana Infantry had 162 officers and men captured in this action.

On 5 May 1864, in the Battle of the Wilderness, Brigadier General Leroy A. Stafford's 2nd Louisiana brigade was routed and Stafford was mortally wounded. Hays' 1st Louisiana brigade rushed to plug the hole in the defensive line. Fighting in dense woods, Hays' brigade blundered into a numerically superior Federal concentration and took a severe beating, losing an estimated one-third of its strength. At the Battle of Spotsylvania on 12 May, a powerful Union column overran a position called the Mule Shoe and Hays' brigade helped seal off the breakthrough. The 8th Louisiana Infantry fought at the Battle of Cold Harbor and Lieutenant Colonel Lester was killed on 2 June.

After Cold Harbor, the regiment was transferred to fight in the Valley campaigns of 1864. At the Battle of Monocacy on 9 July 1864, the remains of Hays' and Stafford's Louisiana brigades were combined under the command of Brigadier General Zebulon York in Major General John B. Gordon's division. Captain Guice (Company E) was killed at the Second Battle of Kernstown on 24 July 1864. The regiment fought at the Third Battle of Winchester on 19 September, Battle of Fisher's Hill on 21–22 September, and Battle of Cedar Creek on 19 October. At Cedar Creek, what were once Hays' and Stafford's brigades in Gordon's division were separate units again.

In December 1864, the 1st Louisiana brigade rejoined Lee's army for the Siege of Petersburg. After some fighting in February and March 1865, Lee's army marched to Appomattox where it surrendered on 9 April. At this time, 3 officers and 54 enlisted men remained in the 8th Louisiana Infantry. There were 252 killed in action, 171 died of disease, 2 murdered, and 1 died by accident out of a total enrollment of 1,321 men. Approximately 80 men deserted.

== See also ==
- List of Louisiana Confederate Civil War units
- Louisiana in the Civil War

== Notes ==
Footnotes

Citations
