= Louisiana Tigers =

Nickname of Confederate army troops from Louisiana

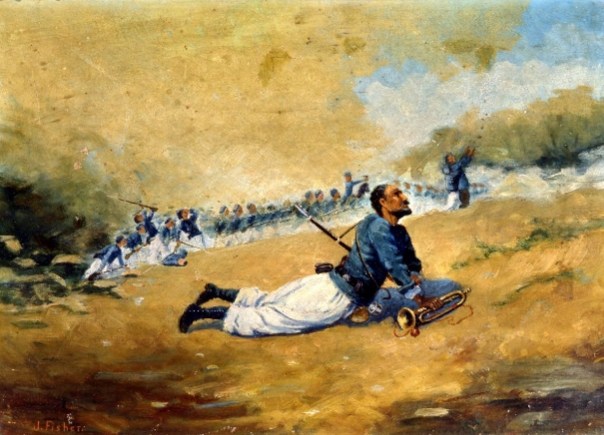
A c. 1870 painting of Louisiana Tiger by Charles J. Fisher

"Louisiana Tigers" was the nickname of several infantry units of the Confederate States Army from Louisiana during the American Civil War. Originally applied to a specific company, the nickname expanded to a battalion, then to a brigade, and eventually to all Louisianan troops in the Army of Northern Virginia. Although the exact composition of the Louisiana Tigers changed as the war progressed, they developed a reputation as brave but undisciplined shock troops.

== The original Louisiana Tigers ==
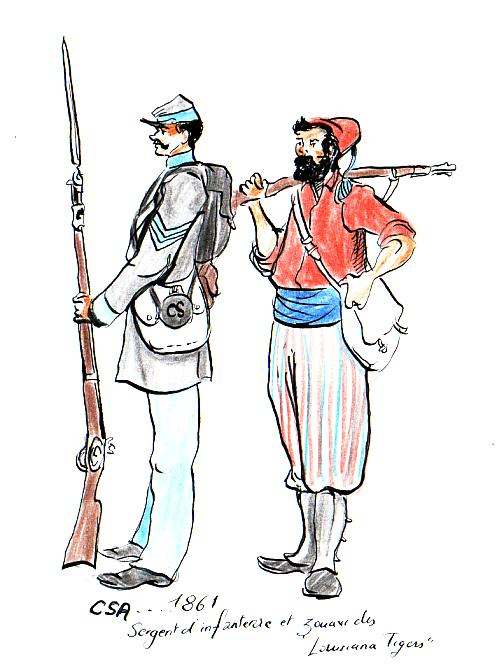
An illustration of a sergeant and Zouave from the Louisiana Tigers

The origin of the term came from the "Tiger Rifles," a volunteer company raised in the New Orleans area as part of Major Chatham Roberdeau Wheat's 1st Special Battalion, Louisiana Volunteer Infantry (2nd Louisiana Battalion). A large number of the men were foreign-born, particularly Irish Americans, many from the city's wharves and docks. Many men had previous military experience in local militia units or as filibusters. They (and the regiments that later became known as the Tigers) were organized and trained at Camp Moore.

=== Origins ===
The famous filibuster Roberdeau Wheat, returning from Italy in the spring of 1861, intended to raise a company of New Orleans troops and then a full regiment for Confederate service. On April 18, 1861, just a few days after Fort Sumter was attacked by Confederate forces, the New Orleans Daily Crescent carried the following announcement: "We understand that our friend, Gen. C.R. Wheat, is about to raise a company of volunteers, to serve in the Army of Louisiana. His headquarters are on 64 [Saint] Charles [Street], where we advise all friends of a glorious cause to repair and enlist."

Wheat called his company the "Old Dominion Guards" to commemorate his native state's (Virginia) recent secession from the United States to join the Southern Confederacy. With the help of Obedia Plummer Miller, a well-established New Orleans attorney, Wheat quickly recruited fifty or so men to his company, mostly expatriate Virginians, men like Henry S. Carey, a relative of Thomas Jefferson's, Richard Dickinson, who would become Wheat's adjutant, and Bruce Putnam, a towering man who became Wheat's intimidating sergeant major.

While Miller, Carey, Dickinson, and Putnam continued recruiting for the Guards, Wheat was able to attract four already-forming companies to his banner: Captain Robert Harris's Walker Guards, Captain Alexander White's Tiger Rifles, Captain Henry Gardner's Delta Rangers, and Captain Harry Chaffin's Rough and Ready Rangers (later called Wheat's Life Guards), which were assembling a few blocks away at Camp Davis on the grounds of the "Old Marine Hospital/ Insane Asylum/Iron Works" between Common and Gravier Streets at South Broad (today's Camp) Street. Many of the men of these precocious units, unlike those from the more upscale Old Dominion Guards, were former filibusters who had served with Wheat or Walker in Nicaragua. Since the late campaigns, they had slipped back into their old jobs as shiphands, stokers, dock workers, watermen, draymen, screwmen, stevedores, or simple laborers on the New Orleans waterfront. As such, they were considered as being the lowest members of white Southern society. One disgusted observer proclaimed that many of Wheat's recruits were "the lowest scum of the lower Mississippi...adventurous wharf rats, thieves, and outcasts...and bad characters generally."

The Walker Guards were raised under the auspices of Robert Harris, one of Wheat's former comrades in the Filibuster Wars. As the name denotes, many of Harris's recruits had "smelt powder…saw the elephant…[and] felt bullets" in Nicaragua. Since the late war, Harris reportedly became the operator of a bawdy gambling establishment along the waterfront. The Tiger Rifles, the Delta Rangers, and the Rough and Ready Rangers, however, Wheat's other cohorts, made no special claim to fame. All that is known about them, other than the fact that they were largely Irish ship hands, dock workers, stevedores, or draymen, is that the commander of the Rangers, Henry Gardner, had signed a petition which called on the governor of Louisiana to convene a secession convention and declared that the intrepid commander of the Tiger Rifles, Alexander White, was a known felon and river pilot. Similar to William Walker in stature, the fiery "White," if that was his real name, was reportedly "the son of a one-time Southern governor," supposedly from Kentucky. During a game of high-stakes poker in his youth, White claimed that he had shot a man who accused him of cheating. Through the influence of his supposed family, he was able to escape prosecution as long as he left the state and went underground. Fleeing to New Orleans, the vast Southern metropolis where it was easy to get lost, White most probably gambled, conned, and boozed his way through life until the War with Mexico when he enlisted in the U.S. Navy to pilot men and material down to Corpus Christi, Tampico, or Vera Cruz. After his five-year enlistment was up, he settled down, got married, and became the captain of the steamer Magnolia, which hauled goods between New Orleans and Vicksburg. During this time White once again lost his temper, severely pistol-whipped a passenger on his steamer, was arrested and convicted, and as a result, ended up in the Louisiana State Penitentiary in Baton Rouge. By March 1861, with Louisiana's secession and the subsequent U.S. blockade, White began to form a company of volunteers around his crew and was even able to rent prime space for a recruiting station at 29 Front Levee, between Gravier and Poydras streets, near the Custom House and Camp Davis.

Wheat, using his gentlemanly appeal, was apparently able to talk Harris, White, Gardner, and Chaffin into forming a battalion under his command with the assurance that all involved would better be able to control their destinies if they acted as one. And with Wheat's eminent stature as a Mexican War veteran, a Southern partisan, a former assemblyman, and a general officer in two foreign armies, they would no doubt get the choice assignments and equipment. As such, on April 23, 1861, the New Orleans Daily Crescent carried the following announcement: "Gen. C.R. Wheat, with reference to raising a battalion, invites such of our friends and citizens generally, as feel an interest in the cause, to call at No. 29 Front Levee Street, where they will find the material for the first battalion of the States, and one that will make its mark when called upon."

With the deal cut, all commands, including the Old Dominion Guards (which was originally assembled across from the prestigious St. Charles Hotel), moved their constituent recruiting stations to Captain White's on Front Levee Street and recruitment became a shared task. To attract even more bellicose souls to his nascent battalion, men who "were actuated more by a spirit of adventure and love of plunder than by love of country," or who filibuster General Henningsen once proclaimed "thought little of charging a battery, pistol in hand," Wheat christened his command "the Tiger Battalion." He then extolled his volunteers, led by Captain White's large company of Tiger Rifles who had "painted a motto or picture of some sort on [their]…broad brimmed…hat[s] such as: A picture of Mose, preparing to let fly with his left hand and fend with his right, and the words, 'Before I Was a Tiger,'" to continue to comb the docks, thoroughfares, alleyways, hotels, poor houses, and jails of the New Orleans waterfront for more recruits. Other slogans that the Tiger Rifles painted on their hats included: "Tiger Bound for Happy Land," "Tiger Will Never Surrender," "A Tiger Forever," "Tiger in Search of a Black Republican," or "Lincoln's Life or a Tiger's Death."

=== Uniforms and equipment ===
While the men of the ad hoc battalion continued to attract more recruits—and in some instances impressing "known Yankees" into service, shaving their heads—Wheat worked through the Ladies Volunteer Aid Association of New Orleans to help uniform the Walker Guards, the Delta Rangers, and the Old Dominion Guards in red flannel "battle" or "Garibaldi" shirts and jean-wool trousers "of the mixed color known as pepper and salt." For headgear, the men apparently retained their own broad brimmed hats of various earthy tones (except Henry Gardner's Delta Rangers who were reportedly presented with gray or blue wool kepis and white cotton havelocks). Harry Chaffin's Rough and Ready Rangers were reportedly uniformed in light gray wool jackets and trousers with matching kepis.

The Tiger Rifles received their uniforms from A. Keene Richards, a wealthy New Orleans businessman. Because he was "so impressed by their drill and appearance" at Camp Davis, Richards elected to outfit White's company as Zouaves: dark blue wool Zouave jackets with red cotton trim (no sereoul), distinctive red fezzes with red tassels, red flannel band collar shirts with five white porcelain buttons, and outlandish "Wedgwood blue and cream" one-and-one-half-inch vertically striped cottonade ship pantaloons that would become their signature. They were also provided with blue and white horizontally striped stockings and white canvas leggings.

Most of the lieutenants and captains of the battalion more than likely uniformed themselves in dark blue wool single breasted frock coats or short jackets with matching trousers, red or blue wool kepis with stiff black leather bills, red officers' sashes, and white canvas leggings worn over or under the trousers. The officers of the Tiger Rifles most probably wore blue wool single-breasted short jackets with red or blue wool trousers, white canvas leggings, and red wool kepis. Wheat chose to wear the uniform of a field grade officer in the Louisiana Volunteer Militia: a red kepi bedecked with appropriate Austrian gold lace, a double-breasted dark blue wool frock coat with brass shoulder scales, and red wool trousers. He also sported a buff general's sash, no doubt to commemorate his past commissions in the Mexican and Italian armies.

While Wheat, Richards, and the ladies were gathering the uniforms, the company commanders arranged to have guidons, banners, or full-blown battle flags made for their units. The Walker Guards' banner was made of "blue silk with a white crescent in the center." The Tiger Rifles' flag consisted of a "gamboling lamb" device with "Gentle As" written derisively above it. The Delta Rangers' flag, which became the battalion's color at the battle of Manassas by "the luck of the draw," was a rectangular silk "Stars and Bars" with eight celestial points in a circular pattern. As the five companies were being filled and uniformed, Wheat moved his volunteers to Camp Walker at the Metaire (pronounced met-are-E) Race Course/Fairgrounds in the center of the city near Carondolet Canal and Bayou John. On May 10, 1861, Wheat was elected major by his fellow company commanders (Obedia Miller becoming captain of the Old Dominion Guards) and state officials officially recognized his battalion. On May 14 the battalion was moved eighty miles north by rail to Camp Moore in Saint Helena Parish, near the town of Tangipahoa and the Mississippi border. The encampment, named after Louisiana's secessionist governor Thomas Overton Moore, was the central depot for organizing, training, and mustering Louisiana volunteer units for Confederate service.

Upon arrival, the Tigers were issued newly fabricated Louisiana Pelican Plate or fork-tongue belts, cartridge boxes, cap boxes, and knapsacks which were manufactured by the New Orleans–based Magee and Kneass or James Cosgrove Leather Companies. They were also issued their weapons. While the Walker Guards, the Delta Rangers, the Old Dominion Guards, and the Rough and Ready Rangers seem to have been issued either M1842 muskets or aged M1816 conversion muskets with socket bayonets, the men of the Tiger Rifles, Wheat's chosen skirmishers, were issued the coveted M1841 "Mississippi" Rifle, made by the Robbins and Lawrence Gun Company of Connecticut. Governor Moore's insurgents had seized these accurate weapons, among the best in service at the time, from the Federal Arsenal at Baton Rouge in January 1861. To offset their absence of bayonets, the Tigers were either issued or brought along their own Bowie-style knife or ship cutlasses, implements which were described as "murderous-looking…with heavy blades…twenty inches long with double edged points…and solid long handles."

=== Training ===
With their weapons and equipment in hand, the men of Wheat's Battalion were trained in the latest light and heavy infantry techniques by the Old Filibuster himself in the pine stands which surrounded Camp Moore. Once their exhausting and sometimes frustrating sessions were over, many of the Tigers often drank, played cards, and got into fights with themselves or other units. One man scoffed that the Tigers were "the worst men I ever saw…. I understand that they are mostly wharf rats from New Orleans, and Major Wheat is the only man who can do anything with them. They were constantly fighting with each other. They were always ready to fight, and it made little difference to them who they fought." Private William Trahern of the up-country Tensas Rifles (soon-to-be Company D, 6th Louisiana) claimed that he once heard Wheat declare: "If you don't get to your places, and behave as soldiers should, I will cut your hands off with this sword!" One man was in fact so afraid of Wheat's belligerent filibusters that he stayed as far away from their encampment as possible. He later wrote: "I got my first glimpse at Wheat's battalion from New Orleans. They were all Irish and were dressed in Zouave dress [sic.], and were familiarly known as 'Tigers,' and tigers they were too in human form. I was actually afraid of them, afraid I would meet them somewhere in camp and that they would do to me like they did to Tom Lane of my company—knock me down and stamp me half to death."

As the Tiger Battalion meshed at Camp Moore, five other men with less military experience than Wheat were commissioned colonels and their assembled companies were mobilized into regiments for Confederate service. No doubt embarrassed and frustrated, Wheat was spurred to desperate action. On June 6, 1861, he made a creative deal with the state to officially commission him a major of volunteers and to recognize his five companies temporarily as the "1st Special Battalion, Louisiana Volunteers." With the special or temporary status secured, Wheat hoped to attract four or five more companies and become the colonel of the soon-to-be organized 8th Louisiana Regiment.

In the political wrangling that followed, Wheat's rowdy dock workers seem to have repelled potential allies to their cause as Henry Kelly, a retired U.S. Army officer from northern Louisiana, became the commander of the Eighth Regiment. With Kelly's ascension, on or about June 8, Captain Jonathan W. Buhoup's company of Catahoula Guerrillas voted to leave Kelly's command and threw in its lot with the Tiger Battalion. As the Guerrillas were primarily the sons of native-born planters or were doctors, lawyers, farmers, overseers, or artisans from Catahoula Parish in northern Louisiana, they were complete social opposites from the majority of the members of Wheat's Battalion. Originally intending to become part of a cavalry regiment, the Guerrillas outfitted themselves in gray wool short jackets, matching mounted trousers, gray wool kepis, riding boots, and, like the Tiger Rifles, were armed with stout Mississippi Rifles, looking much like dismounted dragoons. Buhoup had lobbied hard for John R. Liddell, a prominent Catahoula Parish planter, to be colonel of the 8th Regiment with himself as its lieutenant colonel. When he and Liddell failed in their bids to gain field commissions, however, Buhoup used what was left of his political leverage to have his company transferred to the Special Battalion where he hoped to gain a field commission once it was converted into a full regiment.

With six companies now under his belt—an interesting cross-section of Louisiana society—one which David French Boyd of the soon-to-be organized 9th Louisiana perceptively described as being "a unique body, representing every grade of society and every kind of man, from the princely gentleman who commanded them down to the thief and cutthroat released from parish prison on condition he would join Wheat….Such a motley herd of humanity was probably never got together before, and may never be again," Wheat resolved to get his menagerie to Virginia, the seat of war, as soon as possible. Six other Louisiana infantry formations, the First, Second, Fifth, Sixth, Seventh, and Eighth Regiments, had already been dispatched from the Pelican State to the Old Dominion and Wheat did not want to miss the grand battle that was supposed to win Southern independence in one fell swoop.

On June 13, 1861, not a week after his battalion's formal organization, Wheat loaded five of his six companies (the Rough and Ready Rangers were retained at Camp Moore because it failed to sufficiently fill his ranks) aboard a freight train that was bound for Manassas Junction, a major staging area for the gathering Confederate army in Virginia. In so doing, Wheat gave up his bid to form a regiment from the special battalion, at least for the time being, and his unit was officially named the "2nd Battalion, Louisiana Volunteers" by the state. To the officers and men of the battalion, however, they would always be known as the "1st Louisiana Special Battalion," "the Special Battalion," "Wheat's Battalion," "the Tiger Battalion," "the Star Battalion," "Wheat's Louisiana Battalion," "the New Orleans Battalion," or simply as "Wheat's Tigers."

== The First Battle of Bull Run (First Manassas) ==
The battalion first saw combat during the First Battle of Bull Run (First Manassas), where it anchored the left flank on Matthews Hill long enough for reinforcements to arrive. During this action, the Tiger Battalion conducted several brazen attacks, with Roberdeau Wheat himself suffering a serious wound at the foot of Matthews's Hill. The Tigers were assigned to Brig. Gen. Nathan George Evans's 7th Brigade, Confederate Army of the Potomac, and fought at Stone Bridge, Pittsylvania, Matthews's Hill, and Henry Hill. All told, the Louisiana Tiger Battalion listed 47 casualties at the battle (31 wounded, 12 killed, 3 captured, and one wounded and captured).

"Report of Major Chatham Roberdeau Wheat, First Special Battalion Louisiana Volunteers, of the Battle of Manassas, Virginia, July 21, 1861. Manassas, August 1, 1861,

Sir:

I beg leave herewith, respectfully, to report the part taken by the First Special Battalion of Louisiana Volunteers, which I had the honor to command in the battle of July 21. According to your [i.e., Colonel Nathan Evans's] instructions, I formed my command to the left of the Stone Bridge, being thus at the extreme left of our lines. Your order to deploy skirmishers was immediately obeyed by sending forward Company B under Captain White. The enemy threatening to flank us, I caused Captain Buhoup to deploy his Company D as skirmishers in that direction.

At this conjuncture, I sent back, as you ordered, the two pieces of artillery which you had attached to my command, still having Captain Alexander's troop of cavalry with me. Shortly after, under your orders, I deployed my whole command to the left, which movement, of course, placed me on the right of the line of battle. Having reached this position, I moved by the left flank to an open field, a wood being on my left. From this covert, to my utter surprise, I received a volley of musketry which unfortunately came from our own troops, mistaking us for the enemy, killing three and wounding several of my men [sic.]. Apprehending instantly the real cause of the accident, I called out to my own men not to return the fire. Those near enough to hear, obeyed; the more distant, did not. Almost at the same moment, the enemy in front opened upon us with musketry, grape, canister, round shot and shells. I immediately charged upon the enemy and drove him from his position. As he rallied again in a few minutes, I charged him a second and a third time successfully.

Finding myself now in the face of a very large force—some 10,000 or 12,000 in number—I dispatched Major Atkins to you for more reinforcements and gave the order to move by the left flank to the cover of the hill; a part of my command, mistake, crossed the open field and suffered severely from the fire of the enemy. Advancing from the wood with a portion of my command, I reached some haystacks under cover of which I was enabled to damage the enemy very much. While in the act of bringing up the rest of my command to this position, I was put hors de combat by a Minie ball passing through my body and inflicting what was at first thought to be a mortal wound and from which I am only now sufficiently recovered to dictate this report. By the judicious management of Captain Buhoup I was borne from the field under the persistent fire of the foe, who seemed very unwilling to spare the wounded. Being left without a field officer, the companies rallied under their respective captains and, as you are aware, bore themselves gallantly throughout the day in the face of an enemy far outnumbering us.

Where all behaved so well, I forbear to make invidious [i.e., unfair] distinctions, and contenting myself with commanding my entire command to your favorable consideration, I beg leave to name particularly Major Atkins, a distinguished Irish soldier, who as a volunteer Adjutant, not only rendered me valuable assistance but with a small detachment captured three pieces of artillery and took three officers prisoners. Mr. Early, now Captain Early, as a volunteer adjutant, bore himself bravely and did good service. My adjutant, Lieutenant Dickinson was wounded while gallantly carrying my orders through a heavy fire of musketry. Captain Miller of Company E, and Lieutenants Adrian and Carey were wounded while leading their men into the thickest of the fight. All of which is respectfully submitted C. R. WHEAT, Major, First Special Battalion, Louisiana Volunteers."

== Tiger execution ==
After First Battle of Bull Run, the Tigers grew in disrepute in the army due to their rowdy, sometimes uncontrollable behavior, especially after they were assigned to Brig. Gen. Richard Taylor's newly-formed "Louisiana Brigade" (later called the 1st Louisiana Brigade" or the "Louisianan Tiger Brigade"), Maj. Gen. Richard Ewell's Division, which was encamped ("Camp Florida") around Centreville, Virginia. After one too many drunken brawls and acts of insubordination, two Zouaves, Dennis Corcoran and Michael O'Brien, from the Tiger Rifles were tried by court-martial on Taylor's orders and executed. Their remains are interred at the Centreville (Virginia) Church.

== Stonewall Jackson's Valley Campaign ==
In early spring 1862, Richard Ewell's Division (which included Taylor's Tiger Brigade) was detached from the Confederate Army of the Potomac and sent west to reinforce the Confederate Army of the Valley, which was commanded by Stonewall Jackson. As such, the Tigers participated in his 1862 Valley Campaign, proving instrumental in Confederate victories at the battles of Front Royal, Winchester, and Port Republic. Because of a nasty friendly-fire incident during (and after) the battle of Manassas, the Zouaves of the Tiger Rifles (Company B) decided to dye out the blue in their jackets before the Valley Campaign, making them a ruddy-grey-brown. As for the rest of the battalion, which now consisted of the Walker Guards (A), the Delta Rangers (C), the Old Dominion Guards (D), and Wheat's Life Guards (E, formerly the Rough and Ready Rangers)(out of disgust, the Catahoula Guerrillas asked for and received a transfer to Maj. Henri St. Paul's 7th Louisiana Battalion and then the 15th Louisiana Infantry Regiment), they wore the uniform that was issued to them by their state government in the autumn of 1861: two shirts, one checked and one flannel; one bluish-gray jean-wool short jacket with nine Louisiana State buttons and epaulettes, trimmed with black cotton tape; matching trousers; white canvas leggings (buttoned); blue-gray jean-wool kepis with stiff black bills and trimmed with black wool and one variously colored jean-wool over coat. Many of the men apparently chose to continue to wear their distinctive red flannel Garibaldi shirts however, and they probably kept their issue jackets in a bedroll or pack until discarded. Like in 1861, they were armed with either M1842s or M1816 conversion muskets with socket bayonets. "Wheat's Tigers" were best known for leading the attack, crossing a burning bridge under fire, and seizing a Federal supply train at Front Royal and taking entrenched Federal batteries at the Winchester, and Port Republic.

== Seven Days Battles ==
In late spring, Jackson's force was sent eastward to participate in the Peninsula campaign. Following Wheat's death at the Battle of Gaines's Mill and with but some 60 officers or men under Captain Harris, the Tiger Battalion was merged with the 1st Louisiana Zouave Battalion.

The combined unit took heavy casualties during the Northern Virginia campaign and the subsequent Maryland campaign, where its leader, Lieutenant Colonel Georges De Coppens, was killed. The depleted battalion was transferred from the Army of Northern Virginia after the Battle of Fredericksburg. It served in various districts until it was finally disbanded in December 1864.

== Hays's "Louisiana Tiger" Brigade ==
By then, the nickname "Louisiana Tigers" had expanded to encompass the entire brigade, which was commanded by Brig. Gen. Harry T. Hays following Taylor's promotion and transfer to the Western Theater. By the Battle of Fredericksburg in late 1862, Hays's Brigade was composed of the 5th, 6th, 7th, 8th, and 9th Louisiana Infantry Regiments, and was a part of the division of Maj. Gen. Jubal A. Early.

One of the Tigers' greatest moments occurred on August 30, 1862, the third day of the Battle of Second Bull Run, when members of the 9th Louisiana Infantry Regiment beat back repeated Union assaults on the Confederate lines, described as follows: "After successfully breaking up three Union assaults, the Tigers found themselves dangerously short of ammunition. Two men of the 9th Louisiana were dispatched to the rear for more but a fourth Union attack was mounted before they returned. The ensuing clash was 'the ugliyst fight of any" claimed Sergeant Stephens. Groping frantically for ammunition among the dead and wounded, the Louisianians were barely able to beat off the determined Yankees, who threw themselves up to the very muzzles of the Tigers' muskets. When the Tigers fired their last round, the flags of the opposing regiments were almost flapping together. In desperation Lieutenant-Colonel Michael Nolan shouted for the men to make use of the numerous rocks that lay scattered around the embankment. Sensing that the rebels were at the end of their rope, the Yankees were charging up to the base of the embankment when suddenly fist and melon size stones arched out of the smoke that hung over the grade and rained down upon them. "Such a flying of rocks never was seen," claimed one witness, as the Tigers and other nearby Confederates heaved the heavy stones at the surprised federals. Numerous Yankees on the front line were killed by the flying rocks, and many others were badly bruised." -- From "Lee's Tigers: The Louisiana Infantry in the Army of Northern Virginia" (Louisiana State University Press) by Terry Jones.

Another point of pride for the Tigers came at the Battle of Chantilly, September 1, 1862, where a soldier from Company D of the 9th Louisiana was credited with killing Union General Philip Kearny.

During the 1863 Gettysburg campaign, Hays's Brigade played a crucial role in the Confederate victory at the Second Battle of Winchester, seizing a key fort and forcing the withdrawal of Union troops under Maj. Gen. Robert H. Milroy. During the subsequent invasion of southern Pennsylvania, much of the populace feared the thievery and drunkenness often associated with the colorful Louisianans. At the Battle of Gettysburg, Hays's Brigade stormed East Cemetery Hill on the second day and seized several Union artillery pieces before withdrawing when supporting units were not advanced.

In the autumn of 1863, more than half the brigade was captured at the Battle of Rappahannock Station, and 1,600 men were shipped to Northern prisoner-of-war camps, many to Fort Delaware. Most would be paroled and would later rejoin the Tigers. The replenished brigade fought in the Overland Campaign at the Battle of the Wilderness and the Battle of Spotsylvania Court House, where General Hays was severely wounded.

== Final organization ==
During the subsequent reorganization of Robert E. Lee's army in late May, the much depleted brigade of Tigers was consolidated with the "Pelican Brigade," formally known as the Second Louisiana Brigade, which had also lost its commander, Leroy A. Stafford, a long-time Tiger. Zebulon York became the new commander.

The nickname Tigers subsequently came to encompass all Louisiana infantry troops that fought under Lee in the Army of Northern Virginia. Nearly 12,000 men served at one time or another in various regiments that were destined to be part of the Louisiana Tigers. The name was at times also used for other Louisiana troops, including Levi's Light Artillery Battery and Maurin's Battery, but it was the infantry that is most often associated with the term.

Later, York's consolidated brigade of Tigers fought in Early's army during the Battle of Monocacy and several subsequent battles in the Shenandoah Valley. In late 1864, the Tigers returned to the Army of Northern Virginia in the trenches around Petersburg, Virginia. By the Appomattox Campaign, many regiments were reduced to less than 100 men apiece, and Brig. Gen. William R. Peck had become the Tigers' final commander.

== Postbellum ==
Following the Civil War, many former Tigers joined the Hays Brigade Relief Association, a prominent New Orleans social and political organization. Harry T. Hays, by then the local sheriff, mobilized the association during the 1866 New Orleans Race Riot. A company of former Louisiana Tigers joined the Fenian Invasion of Upper Canada on June 1, 1866, and fought the Canadian militia the next day at the Battle of Ridgeway.

== See also ==
- List of Louisiana Confederate Civil War units
