= Davidson Bradfute Penn =

American politician and Confederate officer (1836–1902)

Davidson Bradfute Penn (1836 - 1902) was a Confederate officer in the American Civil War and a politician in Louisiana. He was the Democratic candidate for lieutenant governor in 1872, in an election racked by violence and corruption. He and his running mate, John McEnery, claimed victory and set up a "government" unrecognized by the federal government.

Charles Conrad Jr. married his sister.

A carte de visite photograph of him survives.
