= 5th Louisiana Infantry Regiment =

Infantry regiment of the Confederate States Army

5th Louisiana Infantry Regiment (Confederate)
- Active: 4 June 1861 – 9 April 1865
- Country: Confederate States of America
- Allegiance: Louisiana
- Branch: Confederate States Army
- Type: Infantry
- Size: Regiment (863 men, June 1861)
- Part of: 1st Louisiana Brigade (Semmes' and Hays')
- Engagements: American Civil War; Action at Dam No. 1 (1862); Battle of White Oak Swamp (1862); Battle of Cedar Mountain (1862); Second Battle of Bull Run (1862); Battle of Chantilly (1862); Battle of Harpers Ferry (1862); Battle of Antietam (1862); Battle of Fredericksburg (1862); Battle of Chancellorsville (1863); Second Battle of Winchester (1863); Battle of Gettysburg (1863); Second Battle of Rappahannock Station (1863); Battle of the Wilderness (1864); Battle of Spotsylvania (1864); Battle of Cold Harbor (1864); Battle of Monocacy (1864); Second Battle of Kernstown (1864); Third Battle of Winchester (1864); Battle of Fisher's Hill (1864); Battle of Cedar Creek (1864); Siege of Petersburg (1864–65); Battle of Appomattox (1865)

Commanders
- Notable commanders: Henry Forno

The 5th Louisiana Infantry Regiment was a unit of volunteers recruited in Louisiana that fought in the Confederate States Army during the American Civil War. Formed in June 1861, the regiment was sent to fight in the Eastern Theater of the American Civil War. The regiment served at Yorktown, White Oak Swamp, Cedar Mountain, Second Bull Run, Harpers Ferry, Antietam, and Fredericksburg in 1862. The regiment fought at Chancellorsville, Second Winchester, and Gettysburg in 1863. At Rappahannock Station in November 1863, virtually the whole regiment was captured. The unit's remnant fought at the Wilderness, Spotsylvania, Cold Harbor, and the Valley campaigns of 1864. It served at Petersburg starting in December 1864 and a mere handful surrendered at Appomattox in April 1865.

== See also ==
- List of Louisiana Confederate Civil War units
- Louisiana in the Civil War
