= William R. Peck =

American politician

William Raine Peck
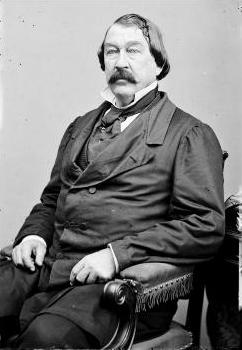
- William Raine Peck
- Born: January 31, 1818; Jefferson County, Tennessee, US
- Died: January 22, 1871 (aged 52) near Milliken's Bend, Louisiana, US
- Burial place: Westview Cemetery Jefferson City, Tennessee
- Military career
- Allegiance: Confederate States of America
- Branch: Confederate States Army
- Service years: 1861–65
- Rank: Brigadier General
- Nickname: Big Peck
- Conflicts: American Civil War

William Raine Peck (January 31, 1818 – January 22, 1871) was an American planter, politician, and soldier who served as a general in the Confederate Army during the American Civil War. The final commander of the famed Louisiana Tigers, Peck was among the largest Civil War generals, standing 6 feet, 6 inches tall and weighing 330 pounds.

== Early life and career ==
Peck was born in rural Mossy Creek in Jefferson County, Tennessee. His family relocated to Louisiana in the 1840s. As a young adult, he bought a plantation across the Mississippi River from Vicksburg, Mississippi. He prospered and purchased additional land and farms, and eventually became one of the region's wealthiest citizens. He constructed a sprawling mansion, "The Mountain," in Madison Parish not far from the village of Milliken's Bend.

Peck represented Madison Parish for several years in the Louisiana State Legislature. A firebrand secessionist and advocate of states' rights, Peck was a signatory to the Louisiana Ordinance of Secession in January 1861.

== Civil War service ==
With the outbreak of the Civil War, Peck, despite his wealth and political connections, enlisted as a private in the 9th Louisiana Infantry on July 7, 1861. After training at Camp Moore in Louisiana, Peck and his fellow soldiers in the regiment were sent to Virginia, arriving too late for any significant participation in the First Battle of Manassas.

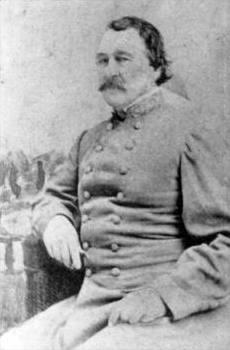
Peck in the Civil War

Peck was commissioned as captain and then lieutenant colonel of the 9th Louisiana during the Gettysburg campaign, and saw action at the Second Battle of Winchester in June and the Battle of Gettysburg in July, where he was involved in the twilight attack on Cemetery Hill.

On October 8, 1863, Peck was promoted to colonel of the 9th Louisiana to succeed Leroy A. Stafford. He led the regiment in the battles of the Wilderness, Spotsylvania, and Cold Harbor in May and June 1864 during the Overland Campaign.

Peck often led the brigade as the senior colonel, and his role in the July 1864 Battle of Monocacy drew praise from his division commander, Maj. Gen. John B. Gordon. He was wounded in the right thigh by a shell fragment at the Third Battle of Winchester in September. He did not return to the field until December. Peck was promoted to brigadier general on February 18, 1865. He was paroled in Vicksburg on June 6 of that year.

== Postbellum ==
Following the Civil War, Peck returned to his Louisiana plantation and resumed active management of the business. Plagued by poor health from his military service, he died six years after the war near Milliken's Bend, Louisiana, of congestive heart failure. He is buried in the family plot in the Old Methodist section of Westview Cemetery in Jefferson City, Tennessee.

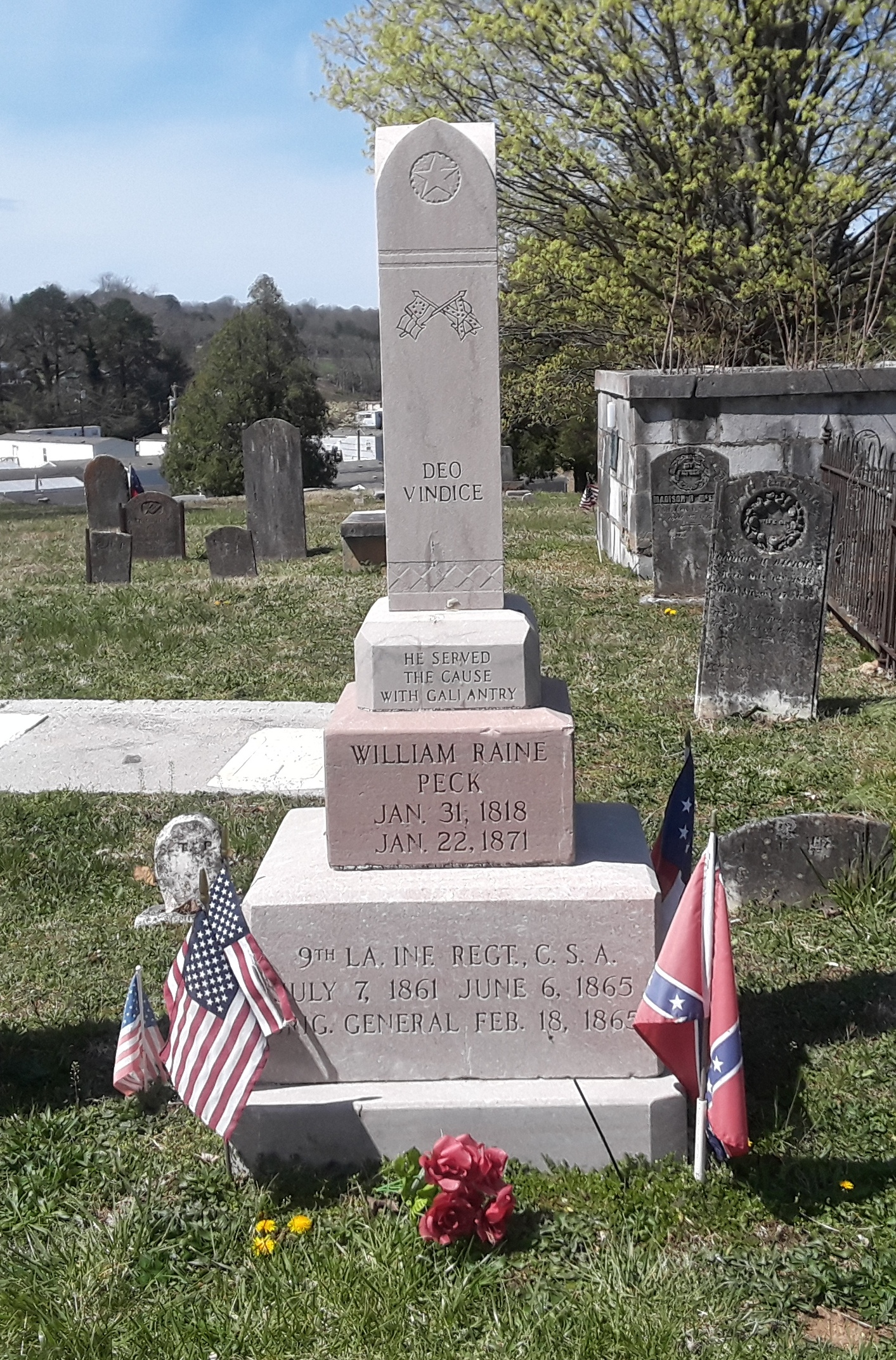
Peck's grave marker at Westview Cemetery

== See also ==
- List of American Civil War generals (Confederate)
