= Second Battle of Rappahannock Station =

Battle of the American Civil War

Coordinates: 38.5330°N 77.8136°W

- Part of the American Civil War
Date	November 7, 1863
Location	Culpeper County and Fauquier County, Virginia
Result	Union victory

Belligerents
United States (Union)	(Confederate States of America) CSA (Confederacy)

Commanders and leaders
George G. Meade	Robert E. Lee

Strength
2,000	2,000

Casualties and losses
419 (killed, wounded or captured)	1,670 (Approx 1,600 captured)

The Second Battle of Rappahannock Station took place on November 7, 1863, near the village of Rappahannock Station (now Remington, Virginia), on the Orange and Alexandria Railroad.

It was between Confederate forces under Maj. Gen. Jubal Early and Union forces under Maj. Gen. John Sedgwick as part of the Bristoe Campaign of the American Civil War.

The battle resulted in a victory for the Union.

== Background ==
After the Battle of Gettysburg in July 1863, the Union and Confederate armies drifted south and for three months sparred with one another on the rolling plains of northern Virginia. Little was accomplished, however, and in late October General Robert E. Lee withdrew his Confederate army behind the Rappahannock River, a line he hoped to maintain throughout the winter.

A single pontoon bridge at the town of Rappahannock Station was the only connection Lee retained with the northern bank of the river. The bridge was protected by a bridgehead on the north bank consisting on two redoubts and connecting trenches. Confederate batteries posted on hills south of the river gave additional strength to the position.

The bridgehead was an integral part of Lee's strategy to defend the Rappahannock River line. As he later explained, by holding the bridgehead he could "threaten any flank movement the enemy might make above or below, and thus compel him to divide his forces, when it was hoped that an opportunity would be presented to concentrate on one or the other part." The Union Army of the Potomac's commander, Maj. Gen. George G. Meade, divided his forces just as Lee expected. He ordered Maj. Gen. John Sedgwick to attack the Confederate position at Rappahannock Station while Maj. Gen. William H. French forced a crossing five miles downstream at Kelly's Ford. Once both Sedgwick and French were safely across the river, the reunited army would proceed to Brandy Station.

== Battle ==
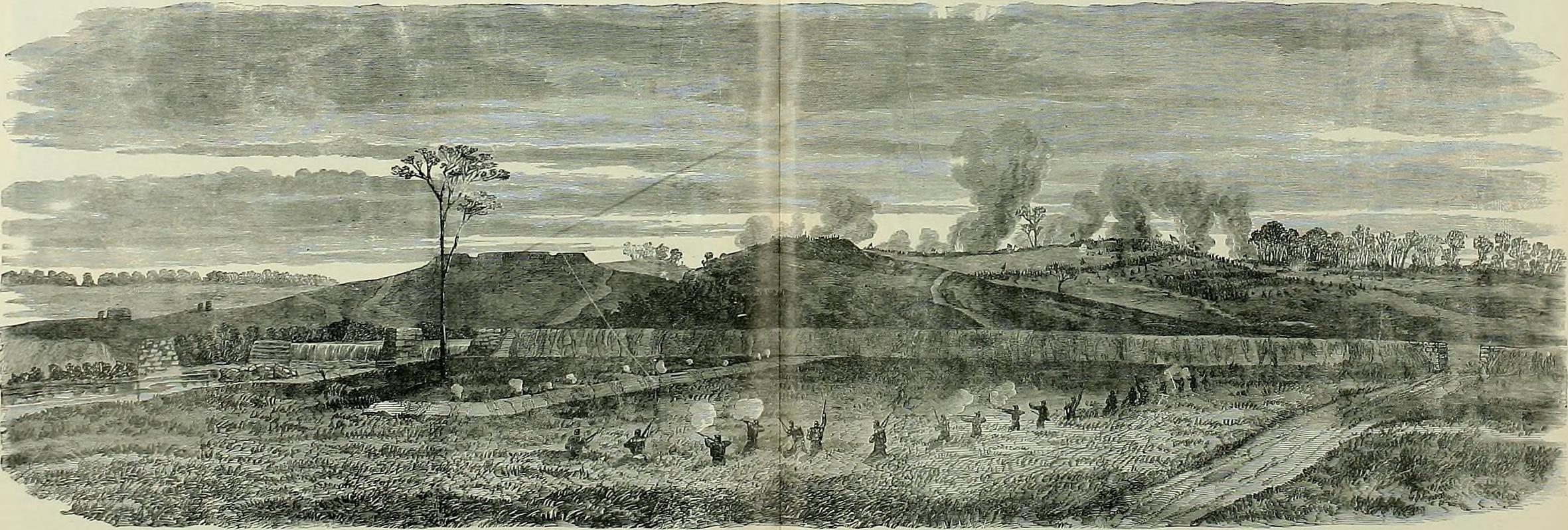
Rappahannock Station, November 7, a portion of Sedgwick's Sixth Corps, and the skirmishers of the 4th New York charging the Rebel works, sketched by Edwin Forbes

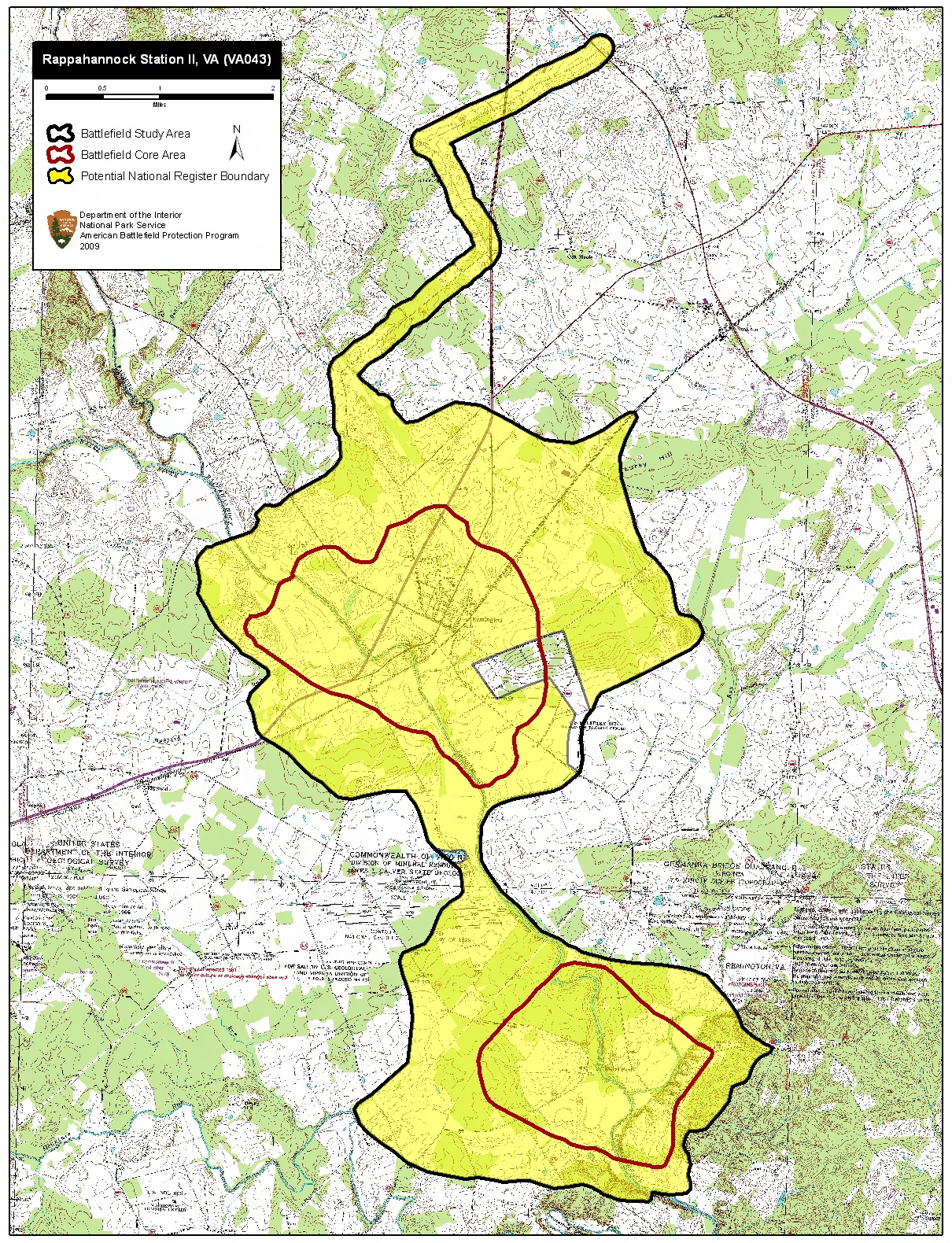
Map of Rappahannock Station II Battlefield core and study areas by the American Battlefield Protection Program.

The operation went according to plan. Shortly after noon on November 7, French drove back Confederate defenders at Kelly's Ford and crossed the river. As he did so, Sedgwick advanced toward Rappahannock Station. Lee learned of these developments sometime after noon and immediately put his troops in motion to meet the enemy. His plan was to resist Sedgwick with a small force at Rappahannock Station while attacking French at Kelly's Ford with the larger part of his army. The success of the plan depended on his ability to maintain the Rappahannock Station bridgehead until French was defeated.

Sedgwick first engaged the Confederates at 3 p.m. when Maj. Gen. Albion P. Howe's division of the VI Corps drove in Confederate skirmishers and seized a range of high ground three-quarters of a mile from the river. Howe placed Union batteries on these hills that pounded the enemy earthworks with a "rapid and vigorous" fire. Confederate guns across the river returned the fire, but with little effect.

Maj. Gen. Jubal Early's division occupied the bridgehead defenses that day. Early posted Brig. Gen. Harry T. Hays's Louisiana brigade and Captain Charles A. Green's four gun Louisiana Guard Artillery in the works and at 4:30 p.m. reinforced them with three North Carolina regiments led by Colonel Archibald Godwin. The addition of Godwin's troops increased the number of Confederate defenders at the bridgehead to nearly 2,000.

Sedgwick continued shelling the Confederates throughout the late afternoon, but otherwise he showed no disposition to attack. As the day drew to a close, Lee became convinced that the movement against the bridgehead was merely a feint to cover French's crossing farther downstream. He was mistaken. At dusk the shelling stopped, and Sedgwick's infantry rushed suddenly upon the works. Col. Peter Ellmaker's brigade advanced adjacent to the railroad, preceded by skirmishers of the 6th Maine Infantry. "No Union regiment gained more laurels that day nor suffered higher casualties," according to the National Park Service. At the command "Forward, double-quick!" they surged over the Confederate works and engaged Hays's men in hand-to-hand combat. Without assistance, the 6th Maine breached the Confederate line and planted its flags on the parapet of the easternmost redoubt. Moments later the 5th Wisconsin swarmed over the walls of the western redoubt, likewise wresting it from Confederate control.

On the right, Union forces achieved comparable success. Just minutes after Ellmaker's brigade penetrated Hays's line, Col. Emory Upton's brigade overran Godwin's position. Upton reformed his lines inside the Confederate works and sent a portion of the 121st New York to seize the pontoon bridge, while the rest of his command wheeled right to attack the confused Confederate horde now massed at the lower end of the bridgehead.

Confederate resistance dissolved as hundreds of soldiers threw down their arms and surrendered. Others sought to gain the opposite shore by swimming the icy river or by running the gauntlet of Union rifle fire at the bridge. Confederate troops south of the Rappahannock looked on hopelessly as Union soldiers herded their comrades to the rear as prisoners of war.

== Aftermath ==
In all, 1,670 Confederates were killed, wounded, or captured in the brief struggle, more than eighty percent of those engaged. Union casualty figures, by contrast, were small: 419 in all.

For the North the battle had been "a complete and glorious victory," an engagement "as short as it was decisive," reflecting "infinite credit upon all concerned." Maj. Gen. Horatio G. Wright noted that it was the first instance in which Union troops had carried a strongly entrenched Confederate position in the first assault. Brig. Gen. Harry Hays claimed to have been attacked by no less than 20,000 to 25,000 Union soldiers—a figure ten times the actual number.

The battle had been as humiliating for the South as it had been glorious for the North. Two of the Confederacy's finest brigades, sheltered behind entrenchments and well supported by artillery, had been routed and captured by an enemy force of equal size. Col. Walter H. Taylor of Lee's staff called it, "the saddest chapter in the history of this army," the result of "miserable, miserable management." An enlisted soldier put it more plainly. "I don't know much about it," he said, "but it seems to be that our army was surprised."

Lee would later call on subordinates to submit reports on the battle in an effort to determine what had gone wrong, but on the night of November 7 more pressing matters demanded his attention. Loss of the bridgehead destroyed his plans for an offensive and left his army dangerously extended on a now indefensible front. Meade, acting quickly, might pin Lee's army against the Rapidan River just as Lee had tried to pin Maj. Gen. John Pope's army against the Rappahannock River one year earlier in the Second Battle of Bull Run. Lee immediately canceled his plans for an attack on French and within hours had his army marching south.

== Battlefield preservation ==
As of November 2021, the American Battlefield Trust and its partners have acquired and preserved 869 acres (3.52 km^{2}) of the battlefield where the First and Second Battles of Rappahannock Station were fought. The battleground for both battles is located along the Rappahannock River at Remington, Va. and features visible earthworks as well as bridge and mill ruins. The earthworks at Remington are no longer there and more than 75% of the battlefield has been developed over.
