= Harry T. Hays =

Confederate Army officer in the American Civil War

Harry Thompson Hays
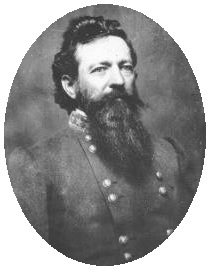
- Harry Thompson Hays
- Born: April 14, 1820; Wilson County, Tennessee
- Died: August 21, 1876 (aged 56); New Orleans, Louisiana
- Burial place: Lafayette Cemetery No. 1, New Orleans, La.
- Military career
- Allegiance: United States of America; Confederate States of America
- Branch: United States Army; Confederate States Army
- Service years: 1846–1848 (USA); 1861–1865 (CSA)
- Rank: First Lieutenant (USA); Brigadier General (CSA)
- Commands: Louisiana Tigers Brigade
- Conflicts: Mexican–American War American Civil War: First Battle of Bull Run; Battle of Port Republic; Battle of Antietam; Battle of Fredericksburg; Battle of Chancellorsville; Battle of Gettysburg; Battle of the Wilderness; Battle of Spotsylvania

Harry Thompson Hays (April 14, 1820 – August 21, 1876) was an American military officer serving in the U.S. Army during the Mexican–American War and a general who served in the Confederate Army during the American Civil War.

Known as the "Louisiana Tigers", his brigade played a major role at the Battle of Gettysburg in July 1863, where they ascended Cemetery Hill in the darkness and overran several artillery batteries before finally being driven off for lack of support.

== Early life and career ==
Harry Thompson Hays was born in Wilson County, Tennessee. Following the deaths of Hays's parents in 1833, he was reared by an uncle in Wilkinson County, Mississippi. He attended St. Mary's College in Baltimore and studied law. Hays soon established a prominent law practice in New Orleans.

Hays saw his first military service during the Mexican–American War, serving in the 5th Louisiana Cavalry. Returning to Louisiana, Hays became active in politics as a Whig and served as a Presidential Elector supporting Winfield Scott in 1852. His brother was the Texas Ranger John Coffee Hays. Author Shelby Foote described him as a "Tennessee-born, Mississippi-raised, lawyer from New Orleans."

== Civil War ==
In 1861, Hays entered the Confederate Army as colonel of the 7th Louisiana Infantry. Showing his attitude toward Northerners, Hays made the rogue's march of his regiment "Yankee Doodle," stating that "More rascals have marched to that tune in one day than to any other." After fighting at the First Battle of Bull Run and Stonewall Jackson's Shenandoah Valley Campaign of 1862, he was shot in the shoulder and knocked unconscious by a shell burst at Port Republic.

Hays was promoted to brigadier general on July 25, 1862 and assigned command of the First Louisiana Brigade, replacing Richard Taylor who had been promoted to major general and sent to the Western Theater. This brigade was known as the "Louisiana Tigers," having taken the name from the original battalion commanded by Roberdeau Wheat. However, Hays had not fully recovered from his wounds, so he missed the Northern Virginia Campaign. He lost half of his unit at the Battle of Antietam. Despite reduced numbers, he continued to lead his brigade at Fredericksburg in December 1862 and Chancellorsville in May 1863.

At the Battle of Gettysburg in July 1863, after he had garrisoned the town, he directed his troops in a twilight assault on Cemetery Hill. The brigade stubbornly fought their way up the steep slope, and for a brief period of time held several Union guns there. However, as General Hays looked rearward, he was dismayed to see that no additional troops had been sent to his support. Reluctantly, and with casualties mounting, he ordered the remnant of his brigade to retire in the gathering darkness just as Federal reinforcements arrived to secure the heights. His brigade brought back several battle flags captured during the attack.

Hays was briefly captured in November 1863, at Rappahannock Station, but escaped. In fierce fighting at the Battle of the Wilderness on May 5, 1864, he lost a third of his remaining men. Five days later, he was badly wounded by a shell fragment at Spotsylvania Court House. He never again served in the Army of Northern Virginia. Upon his recovery, he was transferred to the Trans-Mississippi, then was assigned command in Louisiana.

On May 10, 1865, Hays was promoted to major general by his superior, General Edmund Kirby Smith, but with the demise of the Confederacy, this promotion never was formally approved by Confederate President Jefferson Davis or the Confederate Congress.

== Postbellum career ==
After the war, Hays went back to New Orleans, where, after receiving a pardon from President Andrew Johnson, he served as Sheriff of Orleans Parish for a year. He played a prominent role in the July 1866 New Orleans Massacre, at one time deputizing nearly two hundred of his former soldiers–members of Hay’s Louisiana Tigers brigade–who were now members/beneficiaries of the "Hays Brigade Relief Society." Hays was removed from office in November by Federal government officials, at the insistence of influential former Union general Philip H. Sheridan. He returned to his law practice until his death at age 56 of Bright's disease. Hays was interred at Lafayette Cemetery No. 1 in New Orleans. He was a member of The Boston Club and The Pickwick Club of New Orleans.

Hays was a Freemason, receiving his degrees in Louisiana Lodge #102 in New Orleans.

== See also ==
- List of American Civil War generals (Confederate)
