= Battle of Camp Allegheny =

1861 American Civil War batle

Battle of Camp Allegheny Battle of Allegheny Mountain Battle of Buffalo Mountain
- Part of the American Civil War
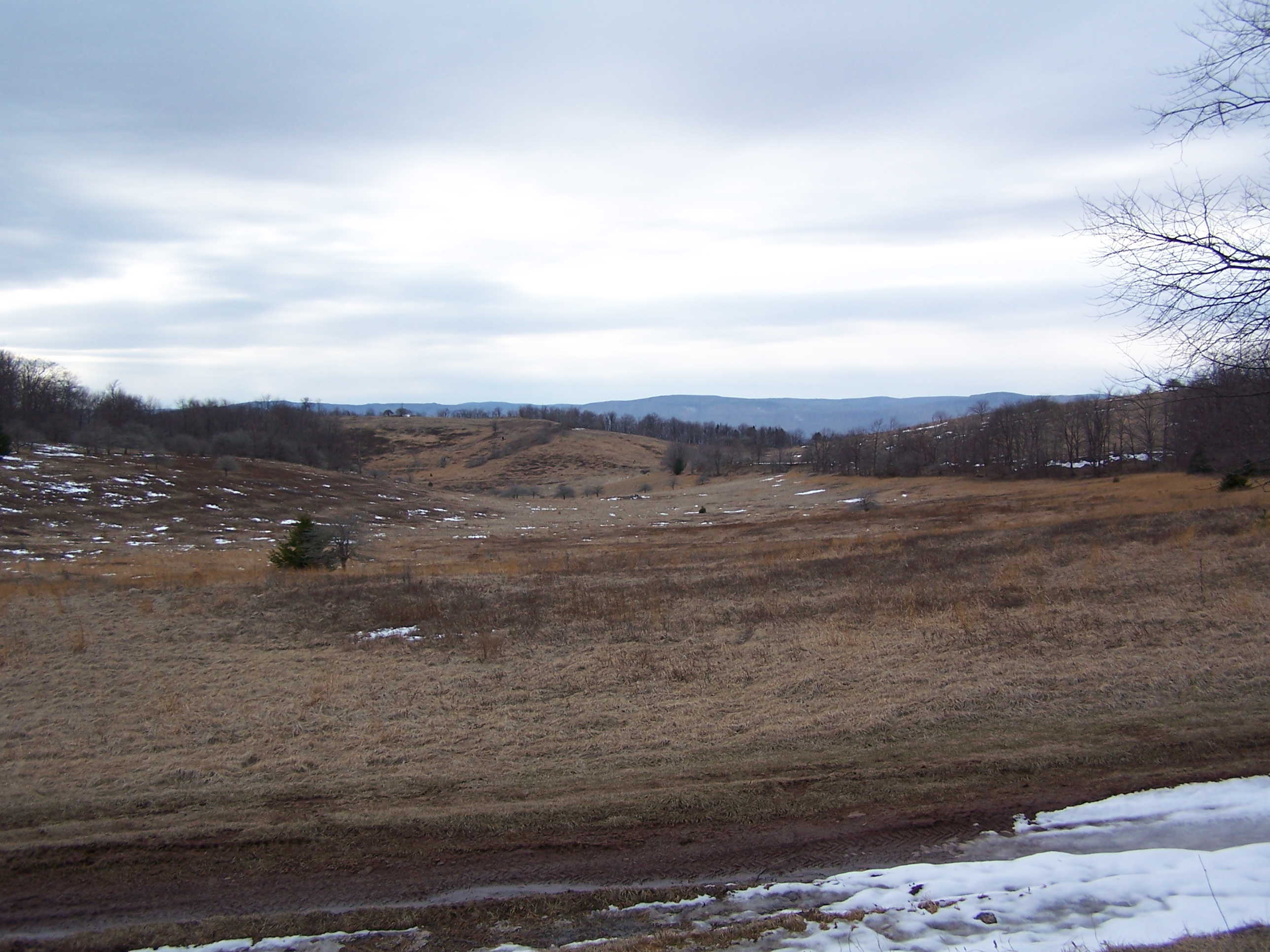
- Battlefield along Allegheny Mountain
Date	December 13, 1861
Location	Pocahontas County, Virginia (now West Virginia) 38°28′26″N 79°43′28″W
Result	Inconclusive

Belligerents
United States (Union)	(Confederate States of America) CSA (Confederacy)

Commanders and leaders
Robert Milroy	Edward Johnson

Strength
Brigades	Brigades

Casualties and losses
137	146

The Battle of Camp Allegheny, also known as the Battle of Allegheny Mountain, took place on December 13, 1861, in Pocahontas County, Virginia (now West Virginia), about 3 miles from the mountainous border of Highland County, Virginia, as part of the Operations in Western Virginia Campaign during the American Civil War. The battle was a small brigade-level conflict, and while the Confederates technically won with a Union withdrawal, it was considered militarily indecisive. However, it had critical implications for the future border of Virginia and West Virginia, ensuring Highland County remained in Confederate hands and would not be involved in the formation of the future state of West Virginia.

== Background ==
In December, Confederate forces under Col. Edward Johnson occupied the summit pass of Allegheny Mountain (roughly 4,400 feet above sea level) to defend the Staunton and Parkersburg Turnpike that offered a point of access from the mountains of western Virginia into the strategic Shenandoah Valley. This was called the "Monterey Line," named for the village behind them in Highland County. The occupation of the high mountain pass coincided with a bitter winter, with much suffering and disease among the Southern troops. Early Union victories in what is now West Virginia had solidified control in much of the western mountains of Virginia, emboldening a Union move to take the Staunton to Petersburg Pike. Perhaps thinking that Confederate morale was low, a Union brigade of 2,000 men under Brig. Gen. Robert H. Milroy attacked Johnson and his 1,200 Confederates at sunrise on December 13.

== Battle ==
Milroy's advance and a Confederate scouting party had skirmished on December 12. The next morning, Milroy divided his troops into a two pronged attack to flank the Confederate camp. The first column advanced up the Staunton-Parkersburg Pike, engaging the Confederate right side for several hours before withdrawing. Because of the difficult mountain terrain, the second Union column arrived shortly after the withdrawal of the first column, therefore unable to support the main body of Union troops on the right as planned, but then attacked the Confederate left. When the left column of Union forces arrived, an officer believed that they were his own pickets returning, ordered his men not to fire and rode forth to bring them into the camp. The Confederate officer was killed by a shot from the Union troops, and the second part of the battle commenced with fierce fighting. After the right Union column had withdrawn, Johnson ordered all his troops who had been fighting there to join the battle on the left flank, and the concentrated Confederate fire broke up the left Union assault and the final Union troops withdrew.

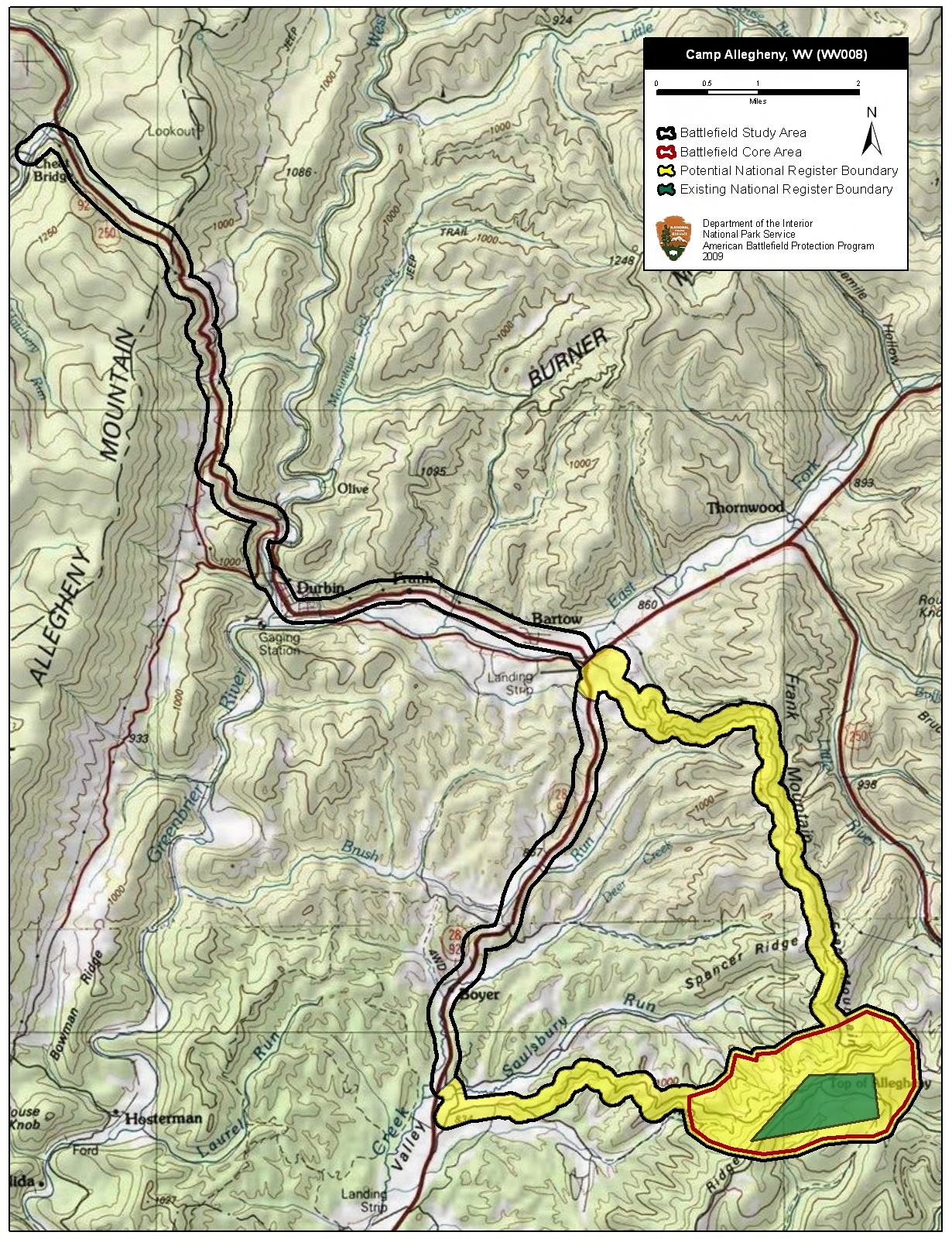
Map of Camp Allegheny Battlefield core and study areas by the American Battlefield Protection Program.

In a piercing winter wind, fighting had raged for much of the sunlit morning as each side maneuvered on the hillside slopes, fields and woods to gain the advantage. On the right flank, Milroy's force found a position in a mountain clearing, among the fallen timber, stumps and brush, which proved to be too difficult for the Confederate infantry to dislodge. A Confederate artillery battery unlimbered and unleashed a "storm of round shot and canister among them, knocking their timber defences about their heads, and making their nest too hot to hold them..." The fighting on the right moved back and forth from advance to retreat, with the Union temporarily occupying the post, only to be driven off. The Confederates attempted their own flanking maneuvers which quickly failed because their force was too thin. The fighting was in such close quarters that the Confederate cannons in the fortification could not be used.

After fighting for over seven hours without taking the positionMilroy's troops withdrew, retreating to his camps at Green Spring Run near Cheat Mountain. Johnson claimed the Confederate losses were 20 men killed and 96 wounded and 28 missing.

According to one Confederate soldier in the 52nd Virginia Infantry:

I had a splendid position in this battle and could see the whole fight without having to take any part in it, and I remember how I thought Colonel Johnson must be the most wonderful hero in the world, as I saw him at one point, where his men were hard pressed, snatch a musket in one hand and, swinging a big club in the other, he led his line right up among the enemy, driving them headlong down the mountain, killing and wounding many with the bayonet and capturing a large number of prisoners...

Confederate units under Johnson's command during the battle were the 12th Georgia Regiment, the 52nd Virginia, the 31st Virginia, a detachment of Pittsylvania (Virginia) cavalry, which fought dismounted with carbines, and the "Lee Battery" of Virginia light artillery, consisting of four pieces.

== Aftermath ==
The battle, though considered insignificant compared to later battles in the Civil War, was actually one of the bloodiest in the initial year of the war (April–December 1861). The Union casualties are estimated at 137 and Confederate casualties at 147. Johnson would receive the nickname "Allegheny" Johnson for his role at the battle and for commanding the forbidding mountain post.

Ironically, the Confederates had received orders to withdraw a few days prior to the battle. But the failed Union assault convinced the Confederate higher command to reinforce Johnson's force in place at Camp Allegheny with five regiments through the remainder of the harsh winter of 1861–62. The weather was bitter snow was often knee deep, something the southern soldiers, mainly from Georgia and Virginia, were not accustomed to. The toll on the Confederate troops was brutal. On March 18, 1862, prior to the subsequent Battle of McDowell in Highland County (May 8, 1862,) Johnson, by then promoted to General, had roughly 4,000 men stationed at Camp Allegheny in Pocahontas County, but his effective strength was only 2,784, as nearly 1,200 men were sick or unavailable.

After the Battle of Camp Allegheny, Johnson also knew that the post was vulnerable to being flanked, and believed that Shenandoah Mountain, 40 miles to the southeast, was a better position to defend the Staunton to Parkerburgs Pike and the approaches to the Shenandoah Valley. Combined with the loss of men in the harsh mountain winter and the logistical challenges of keeping the remote mountain post effectively supplied, General Robert E. Lee agreed to let Johnson abandon the post in favor of Shenandoah Mountain on April 2, 1862. By April 6, 1862, Johnson's constructed Fort Edward Johnson at the site on Shenandoah Mountain, just 26 miles west of Staunton. However, the new fortification was soon abandoned on April 19, when Johnson left to rendezvous with the Confederate Army of Gen. Thomas "Stonewall" Jackson in advance of the Battle of McDowell.

The battles in the rugged and mountainous region of western Virginia were small by later standards but left an enduring footprint because those counties that were in Union control formed the nucleus of the new state of West Virginia. Because of the Battle of Camp Allegheny (and the subsequent Battle of McDowell,) the future state line between Virginia and West Virginia would begin and stop at the Pocohantas and Highland County line, even though the counties shared the same geographic traits and mountain culture. Neither Pocahontas County nor Highland County participated in the creation of West Virginia, but Pocahontas was included in the new state nevertheless as part of the Congressional statehood bill while Highland remained part of Virginia.

In 1903, Ambrose Bierce wrote a column in The New York American about the visiting the battle site, entitled "A Bivouac of the Dead," recalling his involvement in the battle as a member of a Union regiment. Bierce wrote movingly about the sacrifice and suffering of the men in this little remembered battle in a remote area, and hauntingly about how little the battlefield had changed.

== Alternate spelling ==
The battle is also known as the Battle of Alleghany Camp, or the Battle of Alleghany Mountain, and Johnson was actually referred to in the South as "Alleghany Johnson", reflecting the usage that derives from the English colonial era rather than the French derivative, Allegheny. Contemporary accounts from the time in the South use the wording "Alleghany," including Johnson's own account of the battle published in the Staunton Spectator in March 1862.

== Camp Allegheny Historic District ==
- Camp Allegheny
- U.S. National Register of Historic Places
- U.S. Historic district
- Location within West Virginia Location within the United States
- Location: County Route 3, just east of County Route 5 at Top of Allegheny, near Bartow, West Virginia
- Area: 105 acres (42 ha)
- Built: 1861
- NRHP reference No.: 90001446
- Added to NRHP: September 28, 1990

The Camp Allegheny Historic District is a national historic district encompassing one contributing structure and four contributing sites. They are the earthworks, site of hut and campground, cemetery, church site, and the site of the Yeager farmstead.

It was listed on the National Register of Historic Places in 1990.

== See also ==
- Monongahela National Forest – National forest in West Virginia, United States
- White Top — site of Union Army camp several miles west on Cheat Mountain
- Pierce B. Anderson – American military officer (c. 1804–1861), killed at the battle
