= David Ireland (colonel) =

U.S. Army colonel (1832–1864)

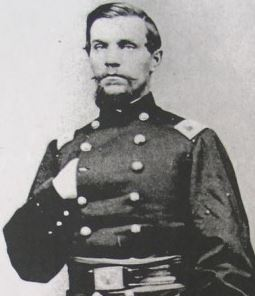
- Born: May 9, 1832; Forfar, Scotland
- Died: September 10, 1864 (aged 32); Atlanta, Georgia, U.S.
- Burial place: Spring Forest Cemetery, Binghamton, New York
- Military career
- Allegiance: United States; Union
- Branch: New York Militia; United States Army; Union Army
- Service years: 1858–1861 (New York); 1861–1864 (USA)
- Rank: Colonel
- Commands: 137th New York Volunteer Infantry
- Conflicts: American Civil War: Battle of Bull Run; Battle of Chancellorsville; Battle of Gettysburg; Battle of Wauhatchie; Battle of Lookout Mountain; Chattanooga campaign; Battle of Ringgold Gap; Battle of Resaca; Battle of Peachtree Creek; Atlanta campaign

David Ireland (May 9, 1832 – September 10, 1864) was a colonel in the Union Army during the American Civil War. Commanding the 137th New York Volunteer Infantry, he played a key defensive role on Culp's Hill in the Battle of Gettysburg.

== Early life ==
Ireland was born on May 9, 1832, in Forfar, Scotland. His family emigrated to New York in 1840. David was apprenticed to his father Charles, a tailor in New York City. In 1858 he joined a regiment of militia, the 79th Cameron Highlanders, officially recognized by New York State on June 9, 1859. Listed in the 1860 census as "Clerk in Express", living at Washington and Gansevoort Street in lower Manhattan. Ireland was named Adjutant of the 79th NY, serving under Col. James Cameron. The regiment was mustered into Federal Service on May 29, 1861, keeping their designation of 79th New York Volunteers.

== Civil War ==
As lieutenant and adjutant of the 79th New York Volunteer Infantry, he fought with the regiment in W. T. Sherman's Third Brigade in the First Battle of Bull Run. With James Cameron killed in action, and many of the unit's officers resigning, a number of the men mutinied. Maj. Gen. George B. McClellan put down the mutiny and took away the unit colors. Command of the 79th New York Infantry fell to Ireland. On September 11, 1861, he led the regiment in an ambush of Confederate troops at Lewinsville, near Falls Church, Virginia. In recognition of this victory, Gen. McClellan restored the regiment's colors, and promoted Ireland to captain, 15th U.S. Infantry, a regular army regiment. He was transferred to Newport Barracks, to train new regiments for Gen. Sherman's Department of the Ohio. In December, he was ordered back to New York to recruit for the 15th U.S. Infantry, first in New York City in January, then in upstate New York, based in Binghamton, where he had rail and canal access to the surrounding counties.

Ireland was the mustering officer for new regiments training in Binghamton in the summer of 1862. Recruiting for the new regiment designated the 137th New York Infantry, he was appointed as colonel of the regiment by the governor, citing his "military experience and ability"—"we know him to be a kind and gentlemanly officer and a brave soldier". Ireland trained his new regiment rigorously at Camp Susquehanna in Binghamton. The 137th New York left by train for Washington, D.C., on September 27, 1862.

From Washington, Ireland and his regiment were sent directly to join McClellan's Army of the Potomac, in camp near Frederick, Maryland, after the Battle of Antietam. The 137th New York was assigned to XII Corps, then led by Brig. Gen. Alpheus Williams. The corps was part of the reserve at the time of the Battle of Fredericksburg and remained so to the end of 1862.

Led by Ireland, the regiment made several forays from its camp (at Bolivar Heights above Harpers Ferry) into northern Virginia in late 1862. Its first major combat service was in the 3rd Brigade, commanded by Brig. Gen. George S. Greene, in 2nd Division, XII Corps, at the Battle of Chancellorsville. During the Battle of Gettysburg, Ireland's regiment was at the far right of the Union line, defending the trenches on Culp's Hill on July 2, 1863. They withstood numerous attacks by the superior Confederate forces of Maj. Gen. Edward "Allegheny" Johnson, holding a vital position. Units from other Union corps aided Ireland's regiment, but it retained its dangerous post until after the last Confederate assault on July 2, after 10 p.m. The battle that night ended when the 137th New York made two bayonet charges, stopping the Confederate advance. Regimental losses were reported as 40 killed, 87 wounded, and 10 missing, including 4 officers dead.

In the fall of 1863, the XII Corps was sent to relieve the besieged Union army at Chattanooga, Tennessee. When Greene was wounded at the Battle of Wauhatchie, Ireland succeeded to command of his brigade. Ireland's brigade served under Brig. Gen. John W. Geary in Maj. Gen. Joseph Hooker's attack during the Battle of Lookout Mountain of the Chattanooga campaign. During the pursuit of the Confederate Army of Tennessee, Ireland's brigade attacked Maj. Gen. Patrick Cleburne's position during the Battle of Ringgold Gap, completing the expulsion of the Confederates into north Georgia for the winter.

When the XI Corps and XII Corps were combined into the XX Corps, Ireland retained command of 3rd Brigade, 2nd Division under Brig. Gen. Geary. On May 15, 1864, Ireland was wounded by a shell fragment at the Battle of Resaca. Col. George A. Cobham, Jr., succeeded temporarily to command of the brigade.

Ireland returned to his brigade on June 6, 1864, and served until his health gave out on September 9. Thus he was back in command at the crossing of Peachtree Creak on July 19, 1864; and he led the brigade at Battle of Peachtree Creek, in which Col. Cobham was killed. After leading his brigade into Atlanta on Sep. 2, 1864, Ireland fell ill with dysentery, dying on September 10. His passing was noted with regret by Maj. Gen. Geary in his report on the Atlanta Campaign. Col. Ireland's fellow officers, meeting on September 10, expressed their regret for "his untimely death, as it were, "On the field of his fame and glory".

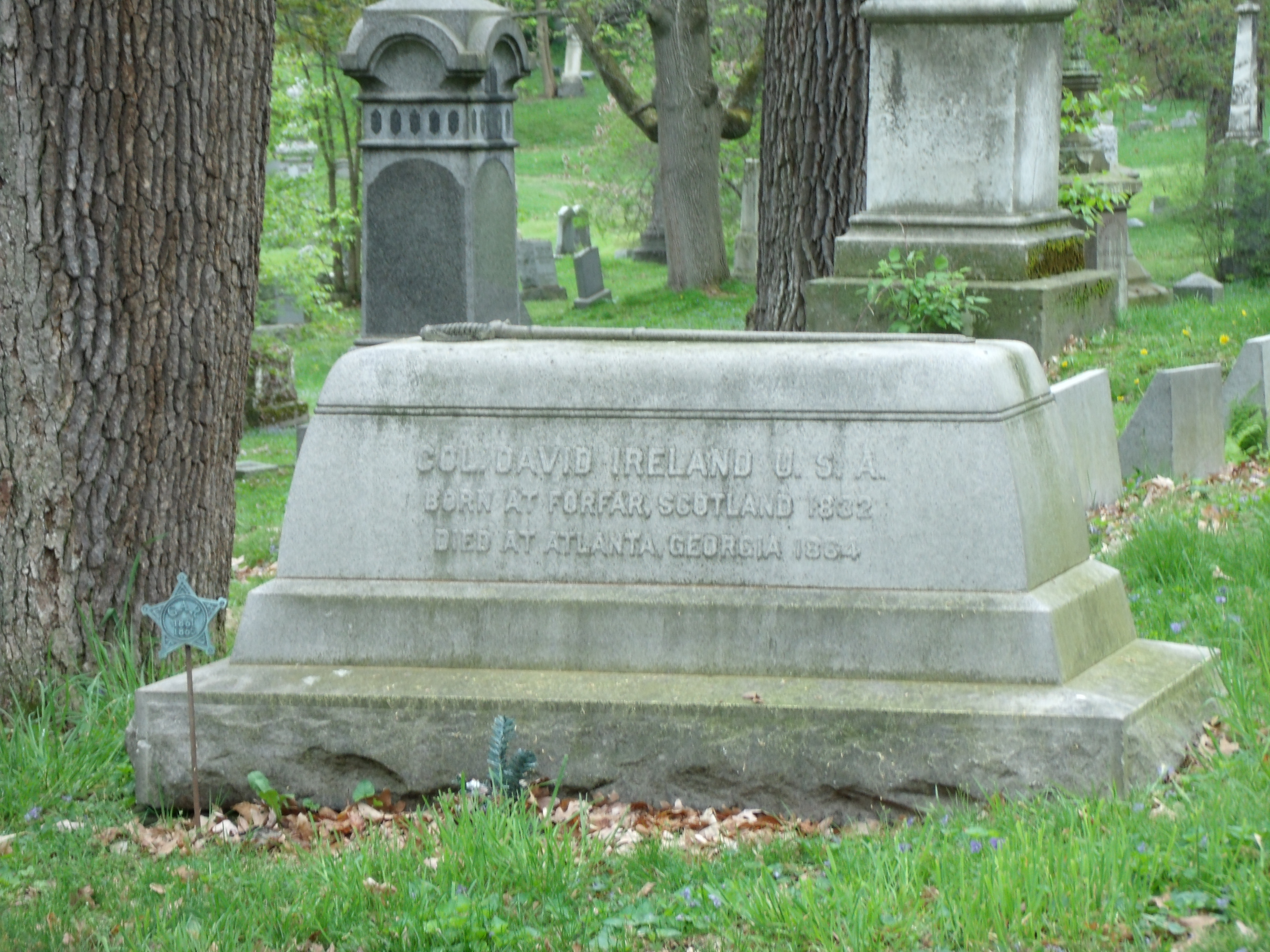
Colonel David Ireland's grave

Ireland is buried in Binghamton at Spring Forest Cemetery. The Sons of Union Veterans of the Civil War named Camp 137 in Binghamton the Col. David Ireland Camp. On August 26, 1863, Ireland had married Sara Phelps in Binghamton. They had no children.
