= Culp's Hill =

Landform south of Gettysburg, Pennsylvania, US

Coordinates: 39.8201°N 77.2203°W

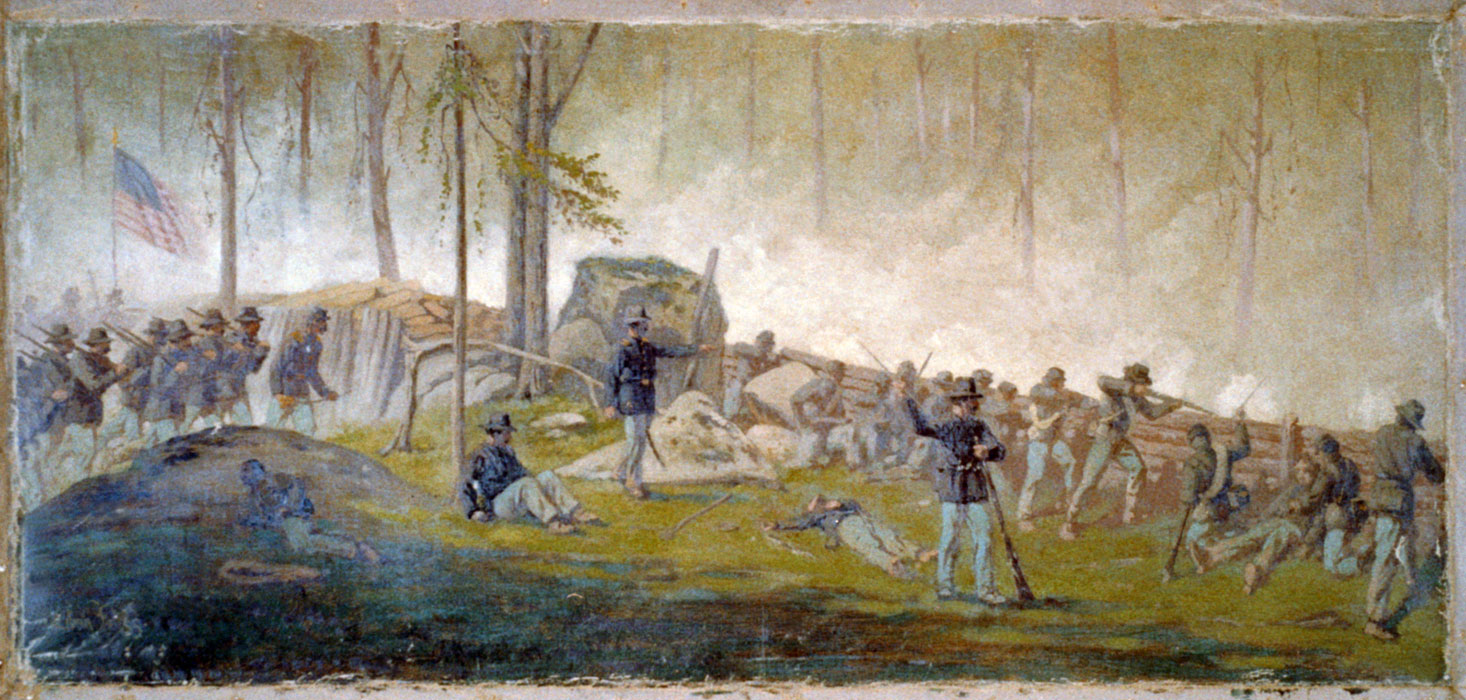
Edwin Forbes' Scene behind the breastworks on Culp's Hill, morning of July 3rd 1863.

Culp's Hill, which is about 3/4 mi (1,200 m) south of the center of Gettysburg, Pennsylvania, played a prominent role in the Battle of Gettysburg. It consists of two rounded peaks, separated by a narrow saddle. Its heavily wooded higher peak is 630 ft (190 m) above sea level. The lower peak is about 100 feet (30 m) shorter than its companion. The eastern slope descends to Rock Creek, about 160 feet (50 m) lower in elevation, and the western slope is to a saddle with Stevens Knoll (formerly McKnight's Hill) with a summit 100 ft (30 m) lower than the main Culp's Hill summit. The hill was owned in 1863 by farmer Henry Culp and was publicized as "Culp's Hill" by October 31, 1865.

During the Battle of Gettysburg, July 1–3, 1863, Culp's Hill was a critical part of the Union Army defensive line, the principal feature of the right flank, or "barbed" portion of what is described as the "fish-hook" line. Holding the hill was by itself unimportant because its heavily wooded sides made it unsuitable for artillery placement, but its loss would have been catastrophic to the Union army. It dominated Cemetery Hill and the Baltimore Pike, the latter being critical for keeping the Union army supplied and for blocking any Confederate advance on Baltimore or Washington, D.C.

== Battle ==
=== Battle of Gettysburg, First Day ===
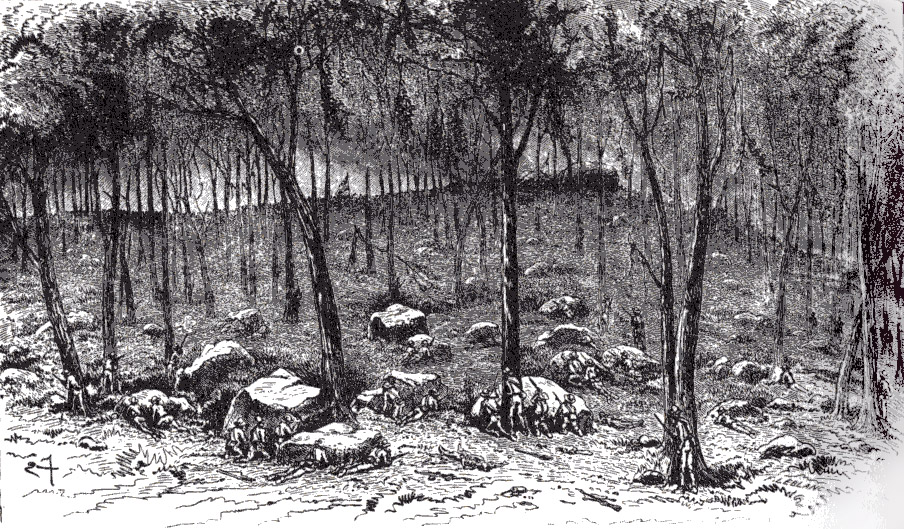
Confederate pickets on Culp's Hill (engraving from The Century Magazine)

Culp's Hill was occupied originally on the nightfall of July 1, 1863, by troops of the Union Army, along with neighboring Cemetery Hill, as a rallying point from the retreat following the Confederate victory that day north and west of town. Lt. Gen. Richard S. Ewell had discretionary orders to seize the heights south of town, and he believed that Culp's Hill was unoccupied and therefore a good target, one that would make the Union position on Cemetery Hill untenable. His third division, under Maj. Gen. Edward "Allegheny" Johnson, had just arrived on the battlefield, and Johnson was ordered to take the hill if he had not already done so.

Johnson did not take Culp's Hill. He sent a small party to reconnoiter, and they encountered the 7th Indiana Infantry of the I Corps, part of Brig. Gen. James S. Wadsworth's division, which had been in the rear guarding the corps trains and was now linked up with the Iron Brigade, digging in following their fierce battle on Seminary Ridge. Johnson's party was taken by surprise and almost taken prisoner before fleeing.

Ewell's failure to take Culp's Hill or Cemetery Hill that evening is considered one of the great missed opportunities of the battle. Another reason for his reluctance to proceed was intelligence that Union troops were approaching from the east on the Hanover Road. This was the vanguard of the XII Corps under Maj. Gen. Henry W. Slocum. If those troops had arrived at the wrong time, Ewell's flank would have been turned.

=== Second day ===
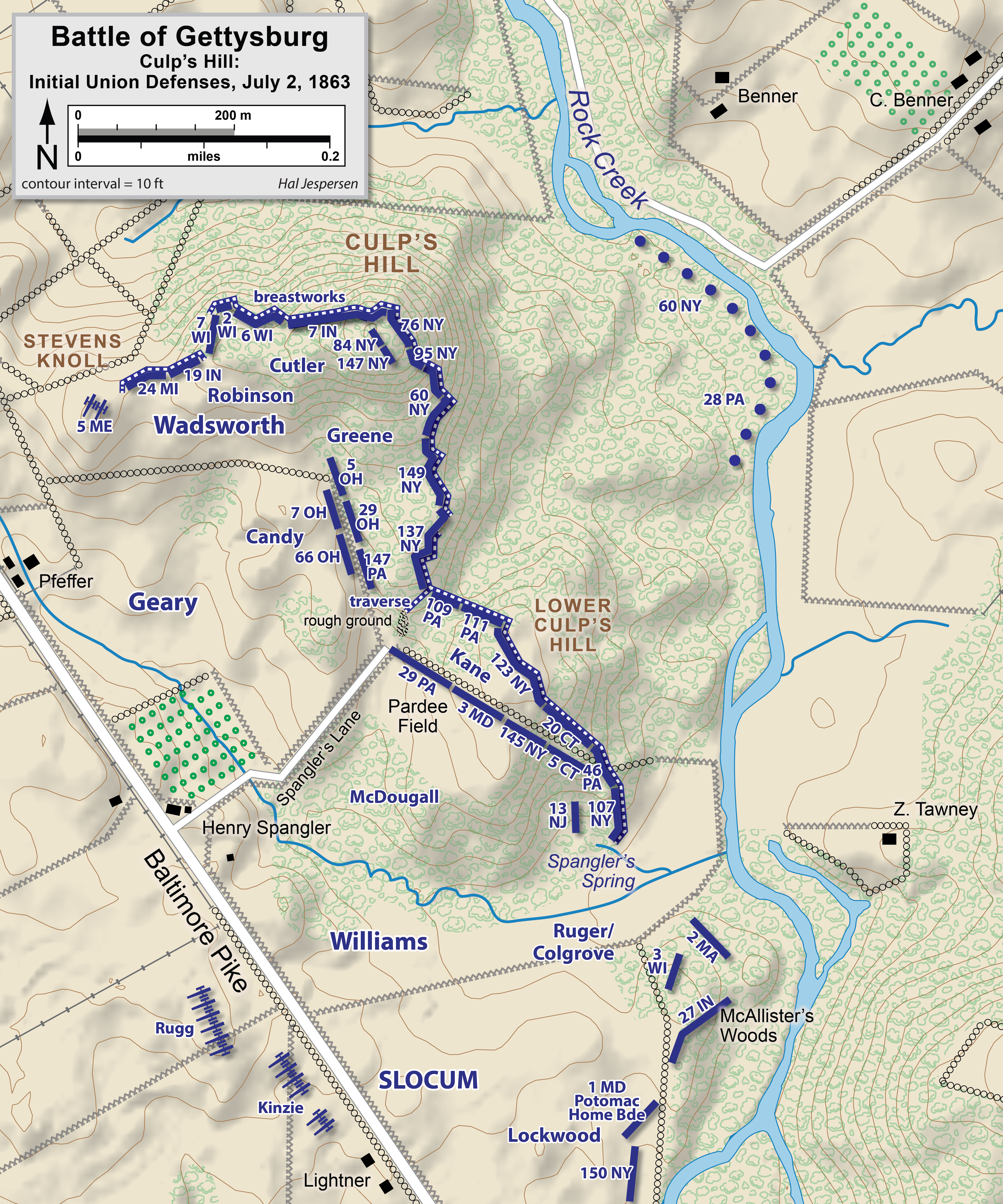
Culp's Hill defenses, afternoon, July 2, 1863.

By mid-morning of July 2, 1863, the XII Corps arrived and fortified the hill. Brig. Gen. George S. Greene, who at 62 was the oldest Union general on the field, was a brigade commander in the division of Maj. Gen. John W. Geary. As a civil engineer before the war, he had a natural understanding of the value of defensive works. His division and corps commanders did not believe they would be stationed at Culp's Hill very long and did not share his enthusiasm for constructing breastworks, but they did not oppose his efforts. He set his troops to the task of felling trees and collecting rocks and earth to create very effective defensive positions.

The Union defensive positions on July 2 began in the north with artillery batteries on Stevens's Knoll, followed by Wadsworth's division of the I Corps, Greene's New York brigade in positions running north to south on the upper slope, and the brigade of Brig. Gen. Thomas L. Kane connecting to Greene's line behind breastworks on the lower slope. Behind these front lines were, from left to right, the brigades of Col. Charles Candy, Col. Archibald L. McDougall, Col. Silas Colgrove, and Brig. Gen. Henry H. Lockwood, extending past Spangler's Spring and through McAllister's Woods. (The latter three brigades were from the XII Corps division of Brig. Gen. Thomas H. Ruger, who was filling in for Brig. Gen. Alpheus S. Williams, temporarily in corps command.)

That morning, Confederate General Robert E. Lee ordered attacks on both ends of the Union line. Lt. Gen. James Longstreet attacked with his First Corps on the Union left (Little Round Top, Devil's Den, the Wheatfield). Ewell and the Second Corps were assigned the mission of launching a simultaneous demonstration against the Union right, a minor attack that was intended to distract and pin down the Union defenders against Longstreet. Ewell was to exploit any success his demonstration might achieve by following up with a full-scale attack at his discretion.

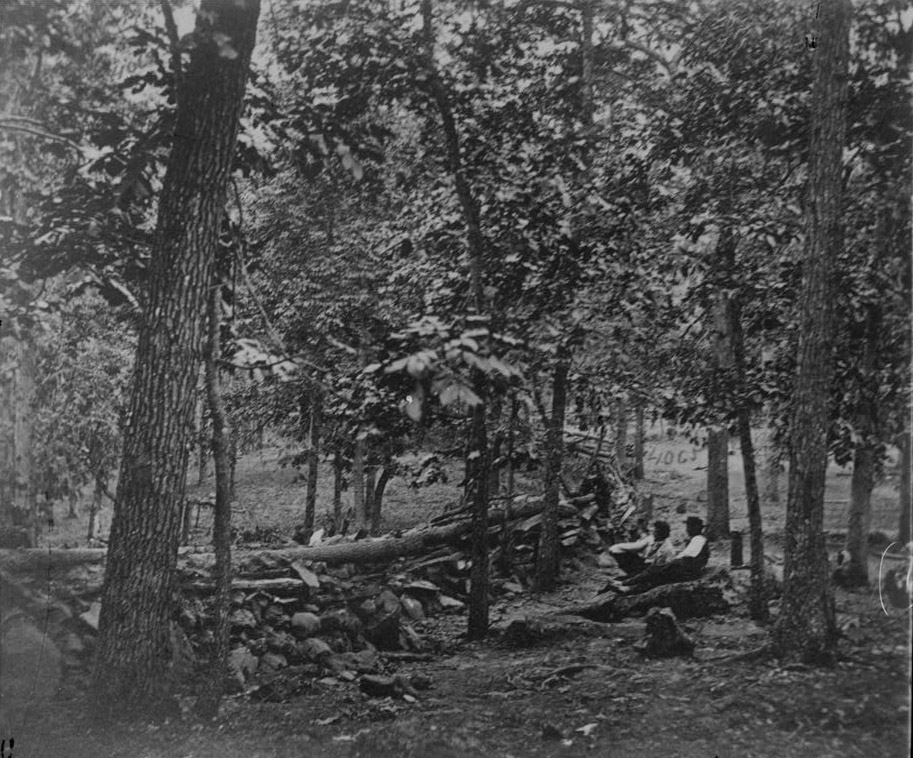
Union breastworks on Culp's Hill.

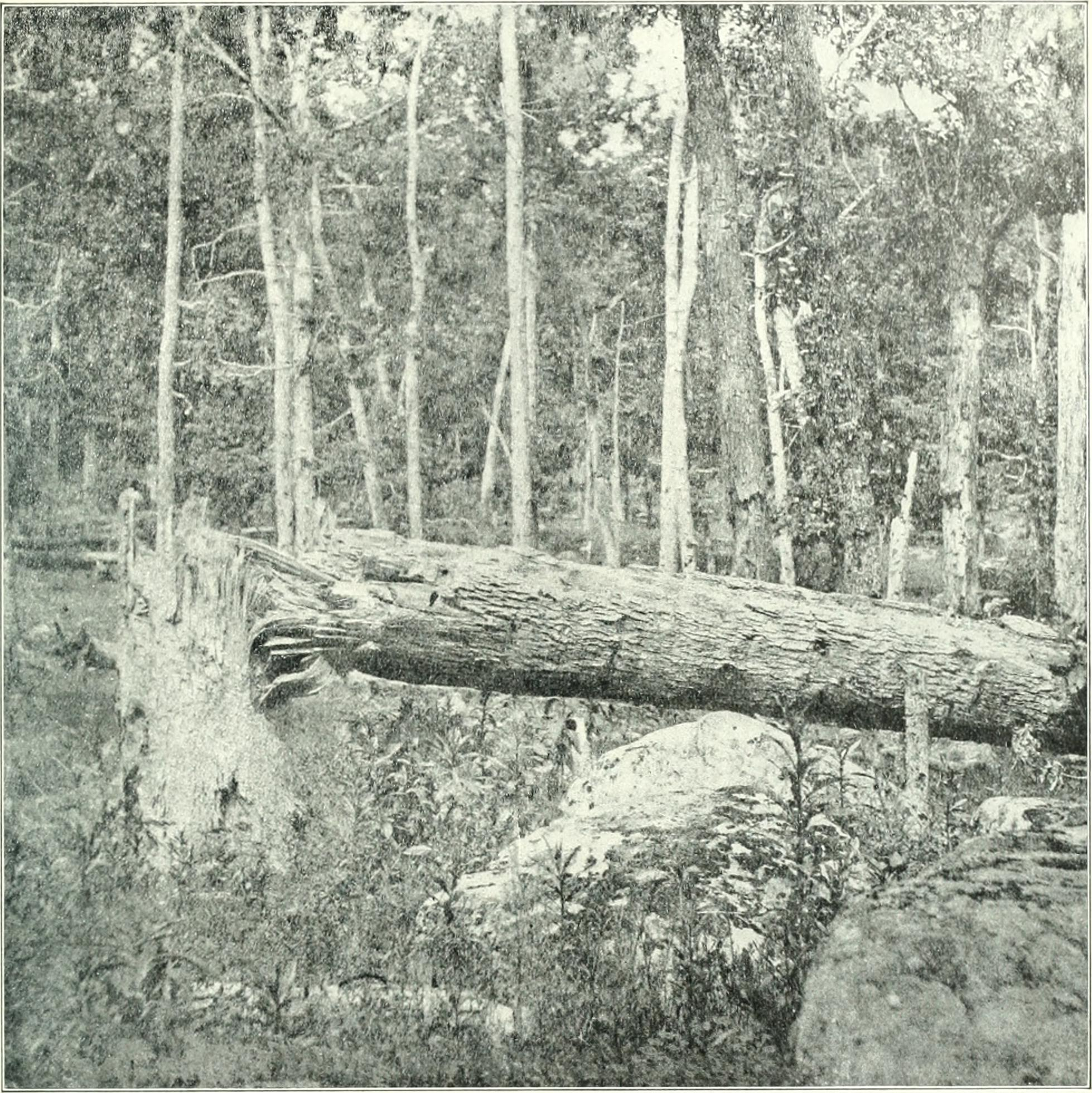
Effect of shot and shell on trees at Culps Hill.

Ewell began his demonstration at 4 p.m. upon hearing the sound of Longstreet's guns to the south. For three hours, he chose to limit his demonstration to an artillery barrage from Benner's Hill, about a mile (1,600 m) to the northeast. But despite this demonstration, Ewell did not hold the attention of Army of the Potomac commander, Maj. Gen. George G. Meade. Meade was occupied with the fierce fighting on his left flank and was scrambling to send as many reinforcements as possible. He ordered Slocum to send the XII Corps in support. It is unclear whether he ordered the entire corps or instructed Slocum to leave one brigade behind, but the latter is what Slocum did, and Greene's brigade was left with the sole responsibility for defending Culp's Hill.

Greene extended his line to the right to cover part of the lower slope, but his 1,400 men would be dangerously overextended if a Confederate attack came. They were only able to form a single battle line, without reserves. Only three of the five brigades of Union troops that were dispatched from the hill saw combat. The remainder of Geary's division marched down the Baltimore Pike and missed a key right hand turn. By the time they realized where they were, the crisis on the Union left flank and center had subsided.

Around 7 pm (19:00), as dusk began to fall, and the Confederate assaults on the Union left and center were slowing, Ewell chose to begin his main infantry assault. He sent three brigades (4,700 men) from the division of Maj. Gen. Edward "Allegheny" Johnson across Rock Creek and up the eastern slope of Culp's Hill. The brigades were, from left to right, those of Brig. Gen. George H. Steuart, Col. Jesse M. Williams (Nicholl's Brigade), and Brig. Gen. John M. Jones. The Stonewall Brigade, under Brig. Gen. James A. Walker, had been dispatched earlier in the day to screen the Confederate left flank to the east of Rock Creek. Although Johnson ordered Walker join the dusk assault, he was unable to do so as the Stonewall Brigade sparred with Union cavalry under Brig. Gen. David M. Gregg for control of Brinkerhoff's Ridge.

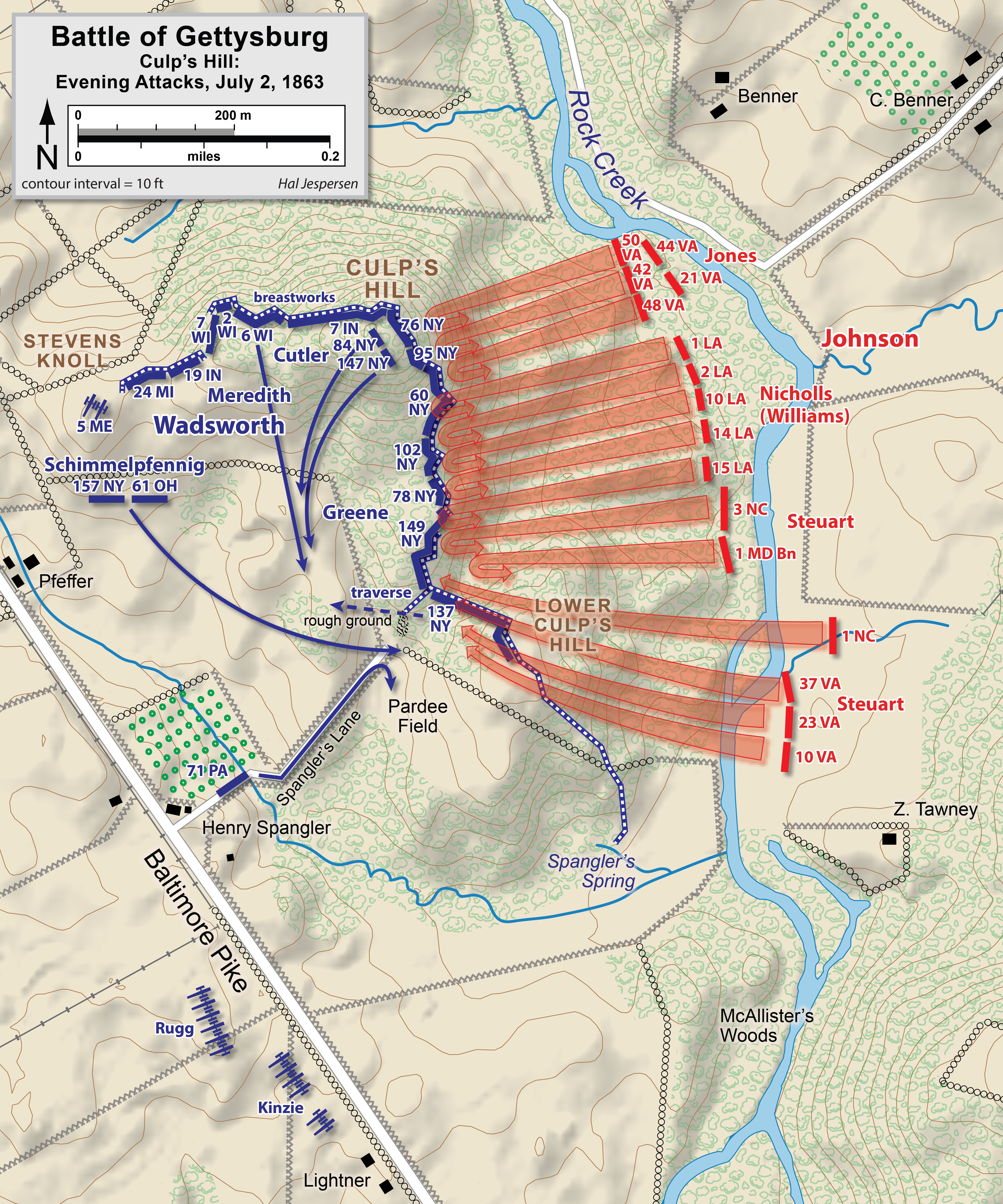
Johnson's attack, evening, July 2, 1863. Confederate Union

As the fighting started, Greene sent for reinforcements from the I Corps and XI Corps to his left. Wadsworth was able to send three regiments, and Maj. Gen. Oliver O. Howard on Cemetery Hill was able to send four—altogether 750 men, who served as Greene's reserve and help to restore dwindling supplies of ammunition.

On the Confederate right flank, Jones's brigade of Virginians had the most difficult terrain to cross, the steepest part of Culp's Hill. As they scrambled through the woods and up the rocky slope, they were shocked at the strength of the Union breastworks on the crest. Their charges were beaten off with relative ease by the 60th New York, which suffered very few casualties. Confederate casualties were high, including General Jones, who was wounded and left the field. One of the New York officers wrote "without breastworks our line would have been swept away in an instant by the hailstorm of bullets and the flood of men."

In the center, Nicholls's Louisiana brigade had a similar experience to Jones's. The attackers were essentially invisible in the dark except for brief instances when they fired, but the defensive works were impressive, and the 78th and 102nd New York regiments suffered few casualties in a fight that lasted four hours.

Steuart's regiments on the left occupied the empty breastworks on the lower hill and felt their way in the darkness toward Greene's right flank. The Union defenders waited nervously, watching as the flashes of the Confederate rifles drew near. But as they approached, Greene's men delivered a withering fire. The 3rd North Carolina "reeled and staggered like a drunken man."

Two regiments on Steuart's left, the 23rd and 10th Virginia, outflanked the works of the 137th New York. Like the fabled 20th Maine of Col. Joshua L. Chamberlain on Little Round Top earlier that afternoon, Col. David Ireland of the 137th New York found himself on the extreme end of the Union army, fending off a strong flanking attack. Under heavy pressure, the New Yorkers were forced back to occupy a traversing trench that Greene had engineered facing south. They essentially held their ground and protected the flank, but they lost almost a third of their men in doing so. Because of the darkness and Greene's brigade's heroic defense, Steuart's men did not realize that they had almost unlimited access to the main line of communication for the Union army, the Baltimore Pike, only 600 yards to their front. Ireland and his men prevented a huge disaster from befalling Meade's army, although they never received the publicity that their colleagues from Maine enjoyed.

In the confusion of fighting in the dark, the 1st North Carolina, brought up from the reserves, fired on the Confederate 1st Maryland Battalion by mistake. (In Gettysburg National Military Park, the monument to this battalion refers to the "2nd Maryland" so that it would not be confused with the two Union regiments named 1st Maryland in Lockwood's brigade. The 1st and 2nd Maryland Regiments were also composed of the same men and officers, the "1st" Maryland having been disbanded in 1862 and subsequently reformed a few months later. The designation "2nd" was not official by the time of Gettysburg and was only used by the men as a moniker and not used in official documents.)

During the heat of the fighting, the sound of battle reached II Corps commander Maj. Gen. Winfield Scott Hancock on Cemetery Ridge, who immediately sent additional reserve forces. The 71st Pennsylvania filed in to assist the 137th New York on Greene's right.

By the time the rest of the XII Corps returned late that night, Confederate troops had occupied some of the Union defensive line on the southeastern slope of the hill, near Spangler's Spring. This caused considerable confusion as the Union troops stumbled in the dark to find enemy soldiers in the positions they had vacated. Gen. Williams did not want to continue this confused fight, so he ordered his men to occupy the open field in front of the woods and wait for daylight. While Steuart's brigade maintained a fragile hold on the lower heights, Johnson's other two brigades were pulled off the hill, also to wait for daylight. Geary's men returned to reinforce Greene. Both sides prepared to attack at dawn.

=== Third day ===
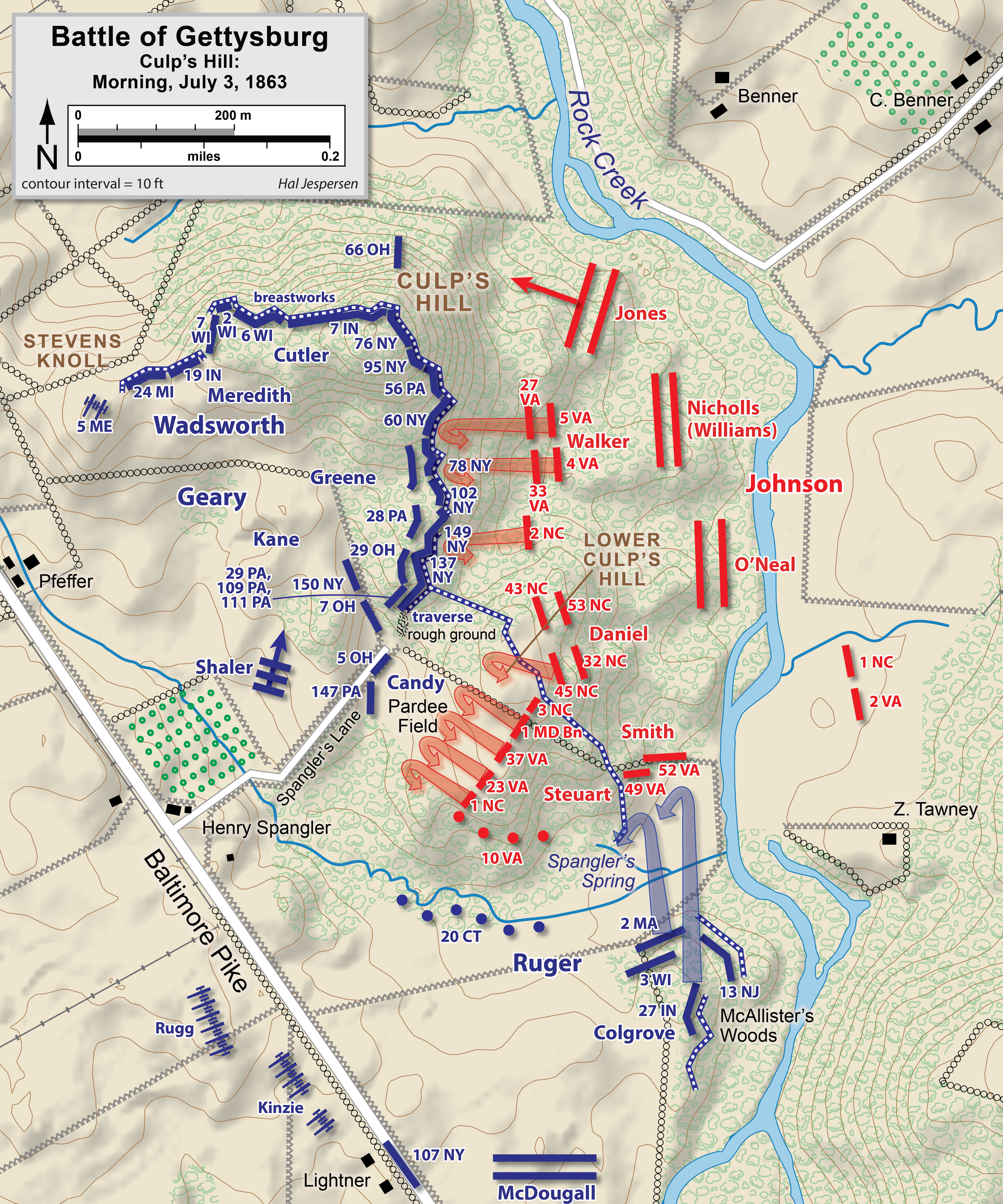
Fighting resumes, morning, July 3, 1863.

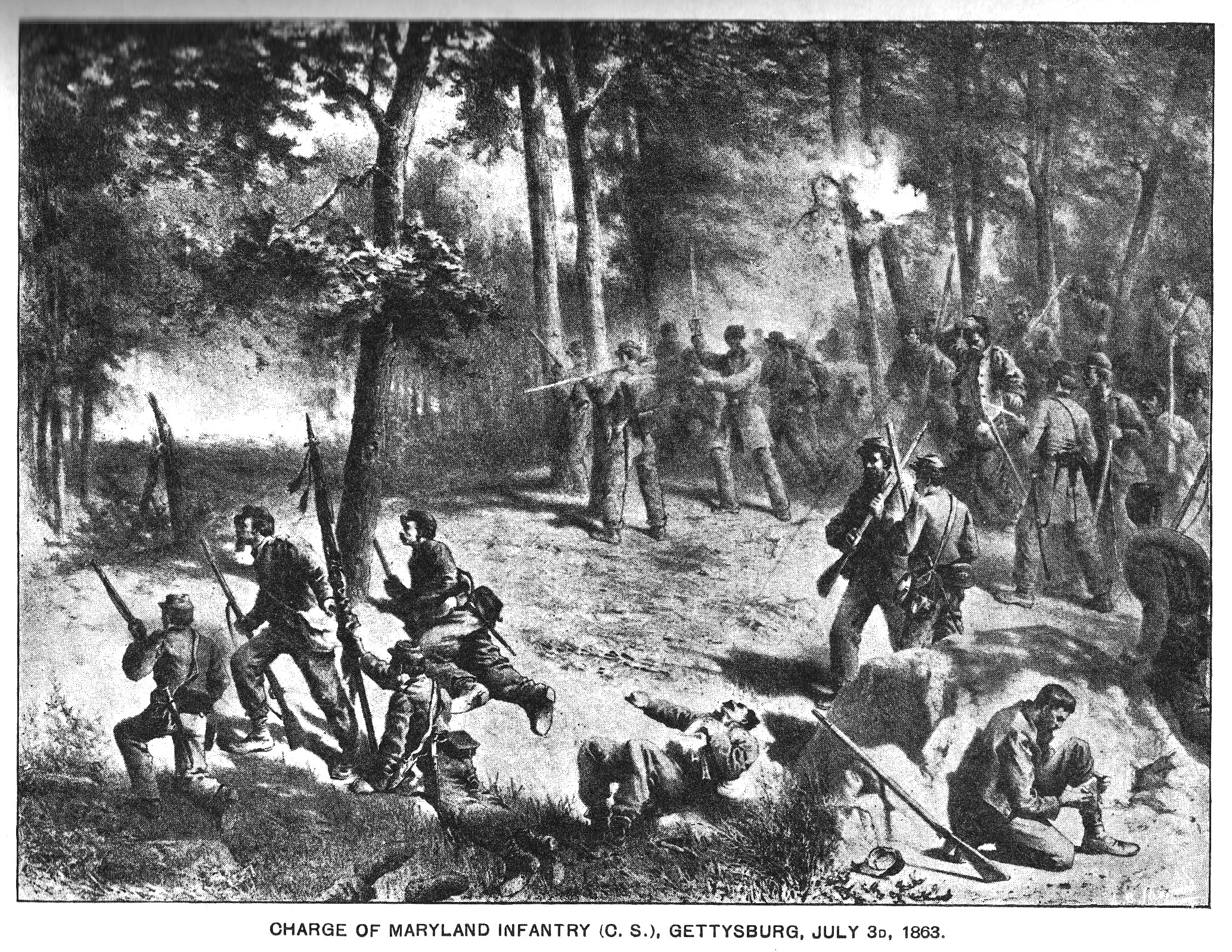
Charge of the 2nd Maryland Infantry, CSA into the "slaughterpen" at Culp's Hill, Battle of Gettysburg, July 3, 1863. So severe were the casualties among the Marylanders that General Steuart is said to have broken down and wept, wringing his hands and crying "my poor boys".

On July 3, 1863, General Lee's plan was to renew his attacks by coordinating the action on Culp's Hill with another attack by Longstreet and A.P. Hill against Cemetery Ridge. Longstreet was not ready for an early attack, and the Union forces on Culp's Hill did not accommodate Lee by waiting. At dawn, five Union batteries opened fire on Steuart's brigade in the positions they had captured and kept them pinned down for 30 minutes before a planned attack by two of Geary's brigades. However, the Confederates beat them to the punch. An attempt by Lee to hold off the start of the fighting was fruitless. Ewell sent back a terse reply by messenger: "Too late to recall." Fighting continued until late in the morning and consisted of three attacks by Johnson's men, each a failure. The attacks were essentially a replay of those the previous evening, although in daylight.

Since the fighting had stopped the previous night, the XI Corps units had been reinforced by additional troops from the I Corps and VI Corps. Ewell had reinforced Johnson with additional brigades from the division of Maj. Gen. Robert E. Rodes, under Brig. Gens. Junius Daniel and William "Extra Billy" Smith and Col. Edward A. O'Neal. These additional forces were insufficient to deal with the strong Union defensive positions. Greene repeated a tactic he had used the previous evening: he rotated regiments in and out of the breastworks while they reloaded, enabling them to keep up a high rate of fire.

In the final of the three Confederate attacks, around 10 am (10:00), Walker's Stonewall Brigade and Daniel's North Carolina brigade assaulted Greene from the east, while Steuart's brigade advanced over the open field toward the main hill against the brigades of Candy and Kane, which did not have the advantage of strong breastworks to fight behind. Nevertheless, both attacks were beaten back with heavy losses. The attacks against the heights were again fruitless, and superior use of artillery on the open fields to the south made the difference there.

The 1st Maryland Potomac Home Brigade (despite its name, a regiment of inexperienced recruits) was badly shot up struggling for a stone wall crossing the open field parallel to the line of works. Geary replaced them with the 147th Pennsylvania of Candy's brigade, which charged successfully, giving the field the name "Pardee Field" after the Pennsylvanians' Lt. Col. Ario Pardee Jr.

The end of the fighting came near noon, with a futile attack by two Union regiments near Spangler's Spring. General Slocum, observing from the distant Powers Hill, believing that the Confederates were faltering, ordered Ruger to retake the works they had captured. Ruger passed the order to Silas Colgrove's brigade, and it was misinterpreted to mean a direct frontal assault on the Confederate position. The two regiments selected for the assault, the 2nd Massachusetts and the 27th Indiana, consisted of a total of 650 men against the 1,000 Confederates behind the works with about 100 yards (100 meters) of open field in front. When Lt. Col. Charles Mudge of the 2nd Massachusetts heard the order, he insisted that the officer repeat it: "Well, it is murder, but it's the order." The two regiments attacked in sequence with the Massachusetts men in front, and they were both repelled with terrific losses: 43% of the Massachusetts soldiers, 32% of the Hoosiers. General Ruger spoke of the misconstrued order as "one of those unfortunate occurrences that will happen in the excitement of battle".

Despite receiving reinforcements and attempting his assaults again, Johnson was repulsed with terrible losses from one end of his line to the other. Colonel O'Neal wrote that his brigade "charged time and again up to their works but were every time compelled to retire. Many gallant men were lost." The losses at Culp's Hill included approximately 2,000 men in Johnson's division, nearly a third. An additional 800 fell from the reinforcing brigades on July 3. The XII corps lost about 1,000 men over both days, including 300 men in Greene's brigade, or one fifth. Alpheus Williams summed up the futility of this fighting: "The wonder is that the rebels persisted so long in an attempt that the first half hour must have told them was useless."

One of the sad stories of the war involved the Culp family. Henry Culp, the owner of Culp's Hill, was the cousin of Esais Culp, the father of John Wesley Culp and William Culp. Wesley joined the Confederate States Army (the 2nd Virginia Infantry) and William the Union Army (the 87th Pennsylvania Infantry). Wesley's regiment fought at Culp's Hill and he was killed in the fighting on or near Henry Culp's property on July 3. Ironically, he allegedly was carrying a message from another soldier, a boyhood friend and Gettysburg native John Skelly, just deceased, to "Ginnie" Wade, the only civilian killed during the battle. His brother William was not present at Gettysburg and survived the war, but William Culp seemed to have regarded his brother as a traitor, and never spoke of him again.

=== Aftermath ===
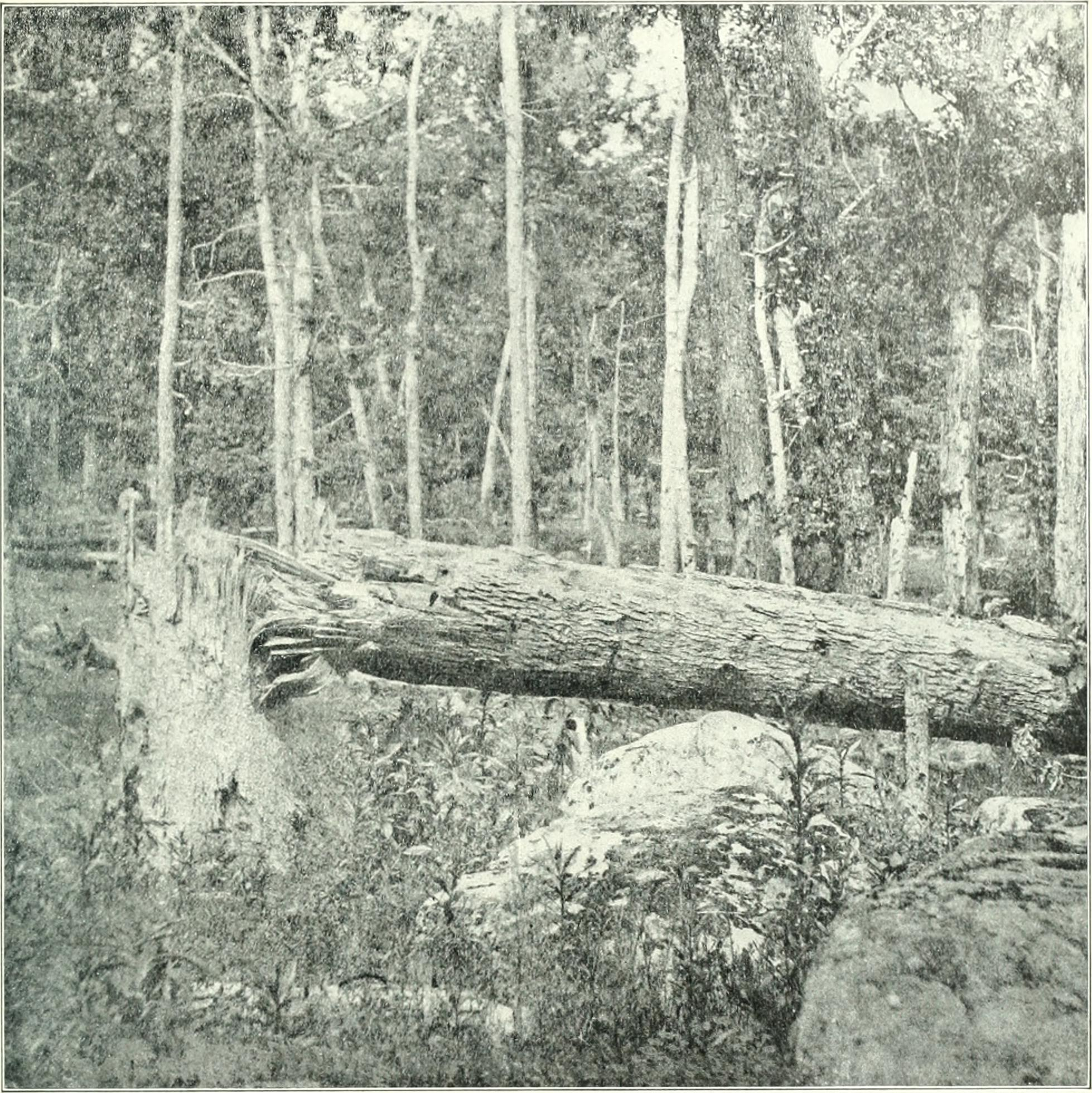
Less than a year later

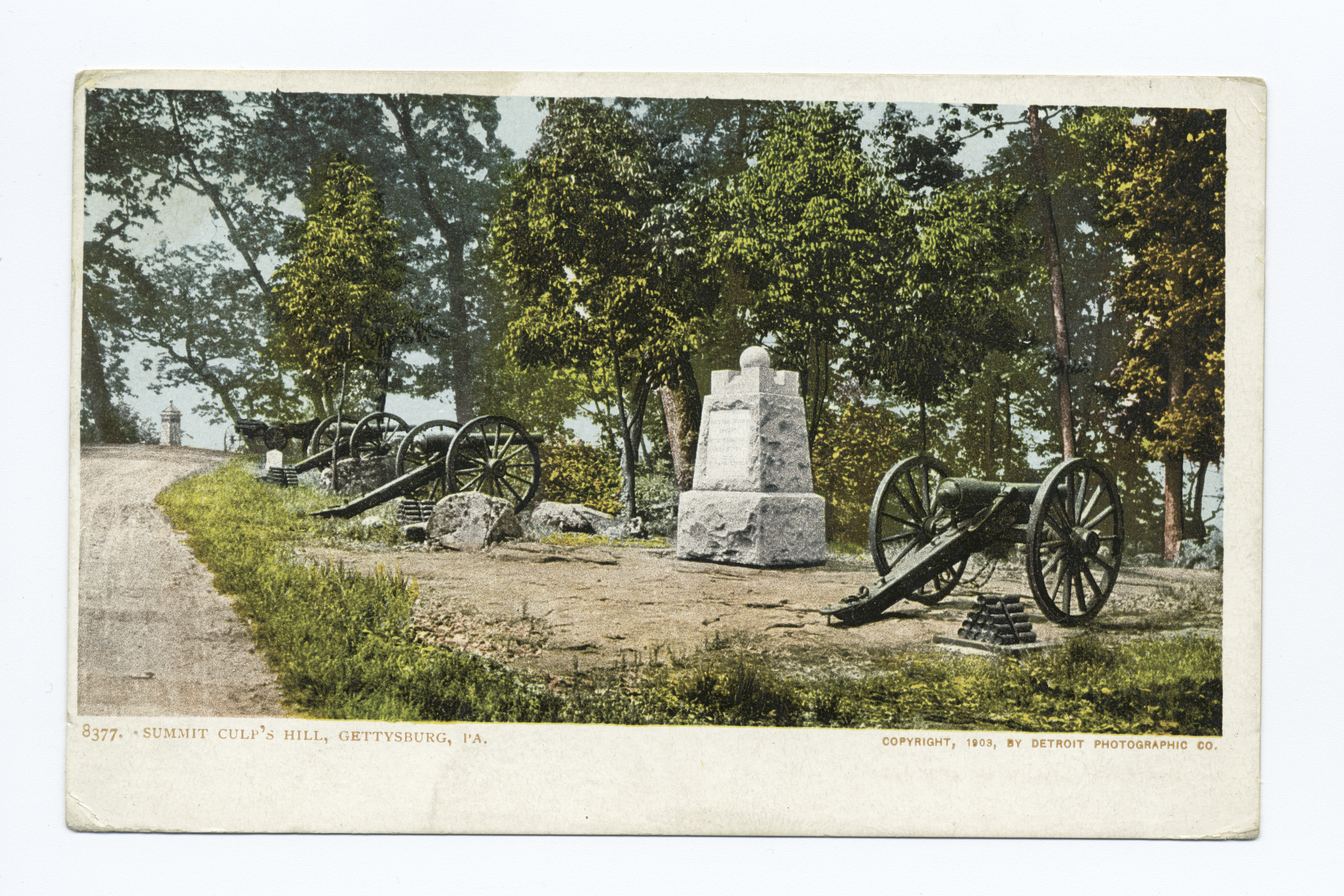
About 35 years later

Culp's Hill became a prime tourist attraction after the battle. It was close to the town and, unlike most battles in open fields, it was heavily wooded and the extreme firepower took a very visible toll on the trees, some of which were completely sheared off. Geary's division alone on July 3 reported that they expended 227,000 rounds. It took over twenty years before the scars of battle faded and nature reclaimed the breastworks.

Today, Culp's Hill is unoccupied except for numerous monuments and an observation tower, all maintained by the U.S. National Park Service as part of the Gettysburg National Military Park.

== Bibliography ==
- Coddington, Edwin B. The Gettysburg Campaign; a study in command. New York: Scribner's, 1968. ISBN 0-684-84569-5.
- Gottfried, Bradley M. Brigades of Gettysburg. New York: Da Capo Press, 2002. ISBN 0-306-81175-8.
- Gottfried, Bradley M. The Maps of Gettysburg: An Atlas of the Gettysburg Campaign, June 3 – June 13, 1863. New York: Savas Beatie, 2007. ISBN 978-1-932714-30-2.
- Grimsley, Mark, and Brooks D. Simpson. Gettysburg: A Battlefield Guide. Lincoln: University of Nebraska Press, 1999. ISBN 0-8032-7077-1.
- Hall, Jeffrey C. The Stand of the U.S. Army at Gettysburg. Bloomington: Indiana University Press, 2003. ISBN 0-253-34258-9.
- Hawthorne, Frederick W. Gettysburg: Stories of Men and Monuments. Gettysburg, PA: Association of Licensed Battlefield Guides, 1988. ISBN 0-9657444-0-X.
- Murray, R. L. A Perfect Storm of Lead, George Sears Greene's New York Brigade in Defense of Culp's Hill. Wolcott, NY: Benedum Books, 2000. ISBN 0-9646261-2-8.
- Petruzzi, J. David, and Steven Stanley. The Complete Gettysburg Guide. New York: Savas Beatie, 2009. ISBN 978-1-932714-63-0.
- Pfanz, Harry W. The Battle of Gettysburg. National Park Service Civil War series. Fort Washington, PA: U.S. National Park Service and Eastern National, 1994. ISBN 0-915992-63-9.
- Pfanz, Harry W. Gettysburg: Culp's Hill and Cemetery Hill. Chapel Hill: University of North Carolina Press, 1993. ISBN 0-8078-2118-7.
- Sears, Stephen W. Gettysburg. Boston: Houghton Mifflin, 2003. ISBN 0-395-86761-4.
- Trudeau, Noah Andre. Gettysburg: A Testing of Courage. New York: HarperCollins, 2002. ISBN 0-06-019363-8.
- Wert, Jeffry D. Gettysburg: Day Three. New York: Simon & Schuster, 2001. ISBN 0-684-85914-9.
