= Pierce B. Anderson =

American military officer (c. 1804–1861)

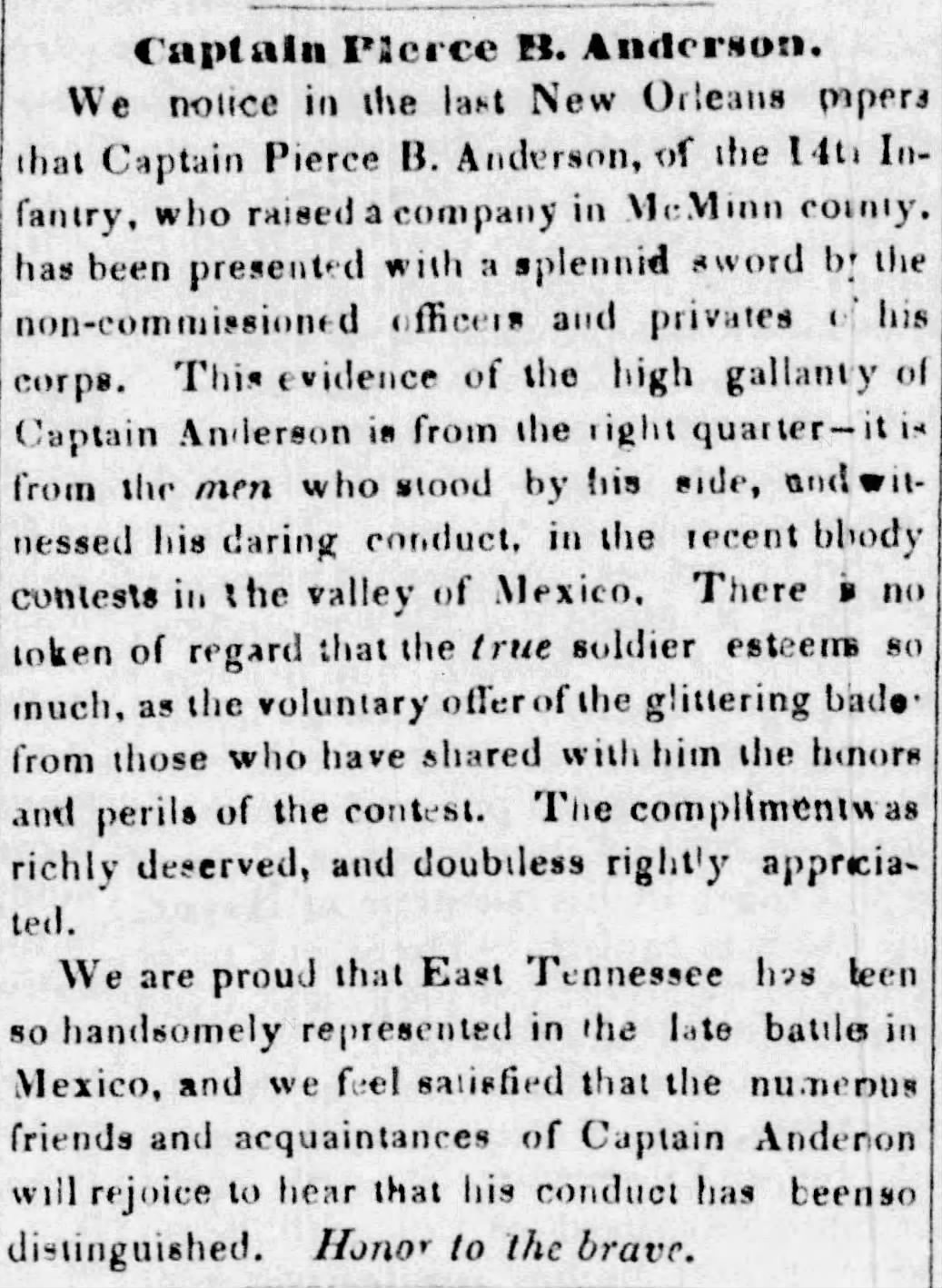
- Knoxville Standard, November 16, 1847
- Born: Hamblen County, Tennessee, U.S.
- Died: December 13, 1861; Pocahontas County, West Virginia

Pierce Butler Anderson (c. 1804 – December 13, 1861) was a lawyer, state legislator, math professor, land speculator, and a West Point-educated soldier. He served as an infantry officer in U.S. Army during the Mexican–American War. He was killed in action during the first year of the American Civil War at the Battle of Camp Allegheny while serving as an artillery officer in the Confederate States Army.

== Biography ==
Anderson was born c. 1804 at Soldier's Rest in what was then Jefferson County and later Hamblen County in East Tennessee. He was the son of Onley Patience Outlaw Anderson and Joseph Anderson, a federal judge, U.S. Senator, and Comptroller of the U.S. Treasury. His brother Alexander O. Anderson was also a U.S. Senator from Tennessee. Anderson was a cadet at the United States Military Academy at West Point, New York from 1823 to 1825. Anderson seemingly had high marks at the academy in the two years he completed. His classmates included one of the Confederate generals Johnston, Theophilus Holmes, Robert E. Lee, and Jefferson Davis. In his third year, he received "a bayonet wound through his right wrist, which permanently disabled him," after which, he "returned to private life in his native East Tennessee hills." There he "studied law at Winchester under the elder Tucker at the same time with C. J. Faulkner and H. A. Wise."

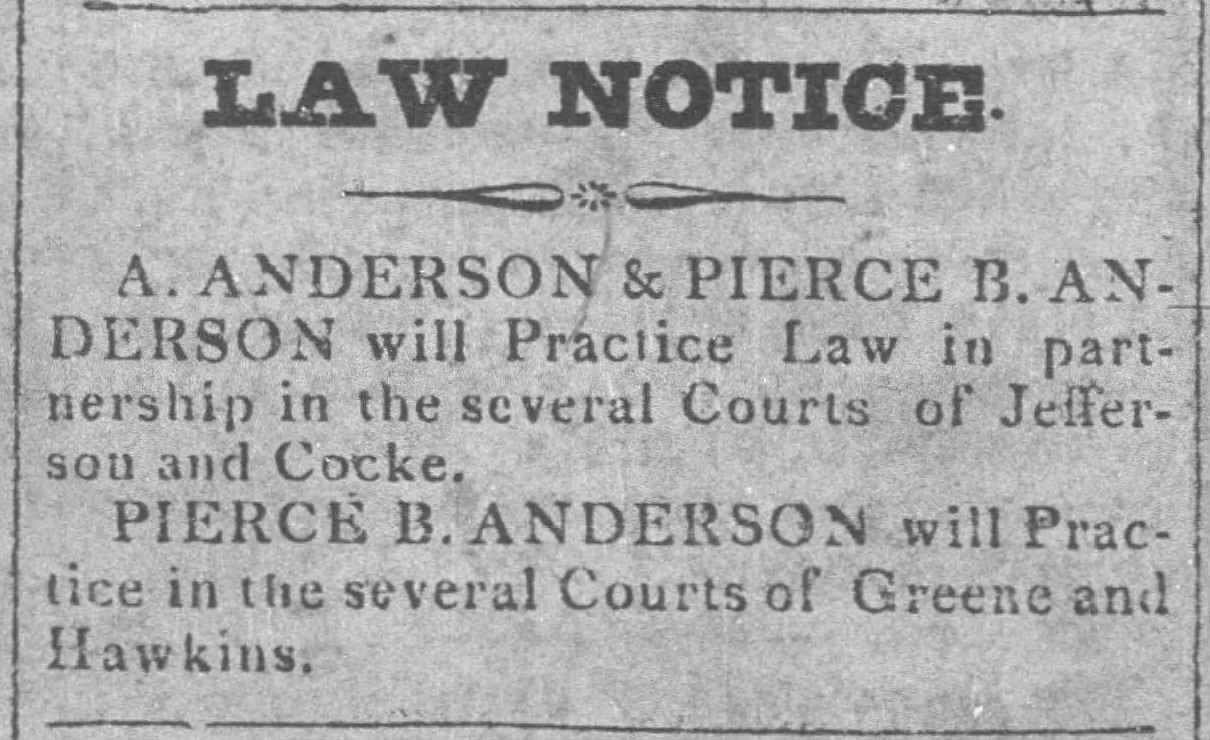
"LAW NOTICE" The American Whig and Knoxville Enquirer, March 11, 1829

After earning his law license he first practiced in Winchester but "later returned to Athens, Tenn., where he engaged in the legal profession, devoting some attention to politics, and served one or two terms in the Legislature, where in 1842–44 he was one of the 'Immortal thirteen' who dead-locked that body in an attempt to elect Hopkins Turney to the United States Senate." He was the Locofoco candidate in McMinn County in 1843 and 1845. He was said to have "resided for many years in the 'Bend of Chucky' in East Tennessee."

He served as a captain of infantry in the Mexican-American War from 1847 to 1848. His son Andrew L. Anderson, later a medical doctor, served alongside him and fought in battles "between Mexico City and Vera Cruz." Col. P. B. Anderson is remembered for his actions at the Battle of Chapultepec when "a Mexican shell fell in the centre of Capt. Anderson's company" which instantly killed 16 or 17 soldiers. Anderson reportedly rallied his troops with the call, "Never mind, my brave men; remember, you are Tennesseans! Forward!" and was later presented with a commemorative sword engraved with those words.

Following the Mexican War he initially intended to return to practicing law but was offered a job teaching mathematics at Franklin College. He accepted, and held the position for two years, and saw several of his children educated at Franklin.

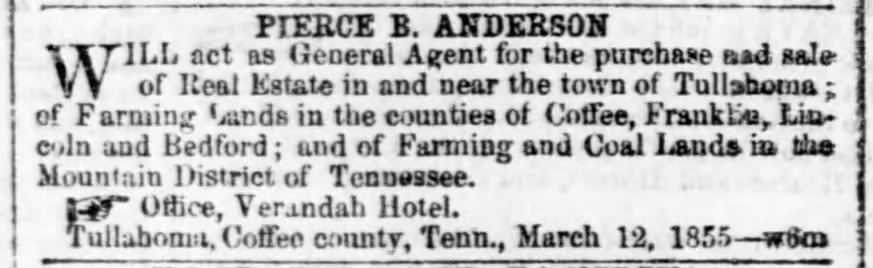
"Pierce B. Anderson" The Tennessean, June 8, 1855

Along with his brother Dr. Thomas Von Albade Anderson, he was part of the founding Town Company of Tullahoma, Tennessee and "planned, surveyed & drew maps of original plot of Tullahoma & was instrumental in moving the Coffee/Franklin Co. line in order that all of the town would lie in Coffee Co." The Tullahoma land venture was apparently unprofitable for the brothers, due to what one history called "unfortunate business transactions and unscrupulous friends." What was called the McRee House, constructed of brick and said to be the second-oldest building in Tullahoma, was built for Anderson in 1854 and stood until it was destroyed in a fire in 1901.

== American Civil War ==
During the American Civil War P. B. Anderson volunteered and was named an officer in the Confederate States Army. He initially joined Turney's First Infantry (not to be confused with the 1st Tennessee Infantry Regiment) formed by Peter Turney, son of the politician he had supported during his years as a state legislator. According to a Confederate veteran named James H. Holman, writing in 1898:

In April 1861, he raised a company which afterwards became Company B, in Turney's First Tennessee Regiment. Thevarious companies composing that regiment assembled at Winchester, Tenn., about the 27th of April, and proceeded to organize, when Pierce B. Anderson and D. W. Holman were elected Majors. The regiment theu proceeded to Lynchburg, Va., and when presented to be mustered into service, the mustering officer, Col. E. Kirby Smith, declined to muster in the two Majors; that the regiment was entitled to but one. Thereupon an election was held for Major, and D. W. Holman was elected to that position. Maj. Anderson then immediately organized a company of artillery in Virginia, his battery being named 'Lee Battery.' He was ordered with his company to the mountains of West Virginia. From the time Capt. Anderson organised his battery until the day of his death he was actively engaged in the field with the enemy.

Anderson was killed at the Battle of Camp Allegheny in present-day West Virginia on December 13, 1861. According to the report of Col. Edward Johnson of the 12th Georgia, "About half an hour after the attack was made on the right this column came up on the left to our trenches. They were evidently surprised to find us intrenched. Here the brave Anderson, by a fatal mistake, lost his life. As the enemy advanced he rode to the trenches and invited them in, thinking they were our returning pickets, at the same time telling our men not to fire. He was instantly shot down by the advancing body of the enemy's force, and Our men then opened a galling fire; upon them, and they fell back into the fallen timber." As retold by a modern historian, "...the sound of gunfire erupted south of the turnpike on the Confederate left. Moody's Hoosiers and western Virginians...arrived after their grueling march and an unscheduled stop at a cider mill. They managed to kill Captain Pierce B. Anderson, one of Johnson's battery commanders, who mistook the Federals for Confederate pickets and, standing on the parapet of the works..." was shot down. According to the centennial history of Coffee County, Tennessee, Anderson's death disrupted a plan to commission him a brigadier general in the Confederate Army.

Anderson was wearing his Mexican War sword when he was killed. It was returned to Tennessee with his body but was later stolen off a train when his son Dr. Anderson was traveling between Marietta and Forsyth, Georgia later in the war.

He is buried in section one of Oakwood Cemetery, originally known as City Cemetery, in Tullahoma, Tennessee. His grave marker erroneously states that he was killed at the Battle of Greenbrier River on October 3, 1861, rather than at Alleghany Mountain in December.

In 1889 a "Confederate bivouac" was named for him in Tullahoma.

== Personal life ==
Anderson was married to Ann M. Luke, said to be a granddaughter of American Revolutionary War general Andrew Lewis, in Mason County, Kentucky in November 1828. They had four sons. Joseph Anderson, also a lawyer and a Confederate, died unmarried before 1898. Andrew Anderson, the doctor, had no issue by a wife who predeceased him. Anderson's son William Anderson was killed fighting for the Confederacy in Turney's First at the Battle of Chancellorsville in 1863. Another son, George W. Anderson, was Union-aligned and became a U.S. Congressman from Missouri after the war.

== Sources ==
- Clift, G. Glenn (1938). "KENTUCKY MARRIAGES AND OBITUARIES (Continued)". Register of the Kentucky State Historical Society. 36 (117): 306–329. ISSN 2328-8183. JSTOR 23371657.
- Ewell, Leighton (1936). History of Coffee County, Tennessee. Manchester, Tennessee: Doak Printing Co. – via HathiTrust.
- Greene, A. Wilson (2019). "4. Camp Allegheny". In Gallagher, Will; Gallman, J. Matthew (eds.). Civil War Places: Seeing the Conflict through the Eyes of Its Leading Historians. Chapel Hill: University of North Carolina Press. pp. 29–35. ISBN 9781469649542. LCCN 2018038928. Project MUSE book 63850.
- Henley, Mrs. Charles Fairfax (July 1898). "The Hon. Joseph Anderson and Some of His Distinguished Relatives and Descendants". The American Historical Magazine. 3 (3): 240–259. ISSN 2333-8970. JSTOR 45340447.
