= George Washington Anderson =

American politician (1832–1902)

George Washington Anderson (May 22, 1832 – February 26, 1902) was an American politician and attorney from Missouri. A Republican, he served in the United States House of Representatives from 1865 to 1869.

== Biography ==
Anderson was born in Jefferson County, Tennessee, on May 22, 1832 to Ann Luke Anderson and Pierce B. Anderson. He attended the local schools and graduated from Franklin College in Tennessee, where his father was math professor for a time. He moved to St. Louis in 1853, studied law, and in 1854 was admitted to the bar in Louisiana, Missouri.

In addition to practicing law, Anderson served in the Missouri House of Representatives in 1859 and 1860, and in the Missouri Senate in 1862.

Though he had been a slave owner, during the American Civil War he joined the Pike County Regiment of the Missouri Home Guard, and was elected to command Company A as a captain. After leading his unit between June and July 1862, Anderson was elected commander of the regiment as a colonel, and he commanded until the Home Guard was disbanded on September 3, 1861. When the militia was reorganized, Anderson was chosen as commander of the 49th Regiment with the rank of colonel, and he led his unit from August 1862 to January 1863, and from September to December 1864.

In 1864, Anderson was elected to the United States House of Representatives, and was reelected in 1866. He served in the 39th and 40th Congresses from March 4, 1865, to March 3, 1869. During both terms, Anderson was chairman of the House Committee on Mileage. He declined to be a candidate for renomination in 1868.

After leaving Congress, Anderson resumed the practice of law and joined first the Liberal Republican Party, and later the Democratic Party. He subsequently moved from Pike County to St. Louis, and in 1884, Anderson was appointed judge of the St. Louis Police Court's ninth district. He died on February 26, 1902, while visiting his brother in Rhea Springs, Tennessee. He was buried at Leuty Cemetery near Rhea Springs.

U.S. House of Representatives
Preceded by James S. Rollins	Member of the U.S. House of Representatives from Missouri's 9th congressional district March 4, 1865 – March 3, 1869	Succeeded by David P. Dyer
