= 137th New York Infantry Regiment =

- Active: August 31, 1862 - June 9, 1865
- Country: United States
- Allegiance: Union
- Branch: Infantry
- Size: 1,111
- Engagements: Battle of Chancellorsville; Battle of Gettysburg; Battle of Wauhatchie; Battle of Lookout Mountain; Battle of Missionary Ridge; Atlanta campaign Battle of Resaca; Battle of Dallas; Battle of New Hope Church; Battle of Allatoona; Battle of Kolb's Farm; Battle of Kennesaw Mountain; Battle of Marietta; Battle of Peachtree Creek; Siege of Atlanta; Sherman's March to the Sea; Carolinas campaign Battle of Bentonville

Commanders
- Colonel: David Ireland
- Lieutenant Colonel: Koert S. Van Voorhees

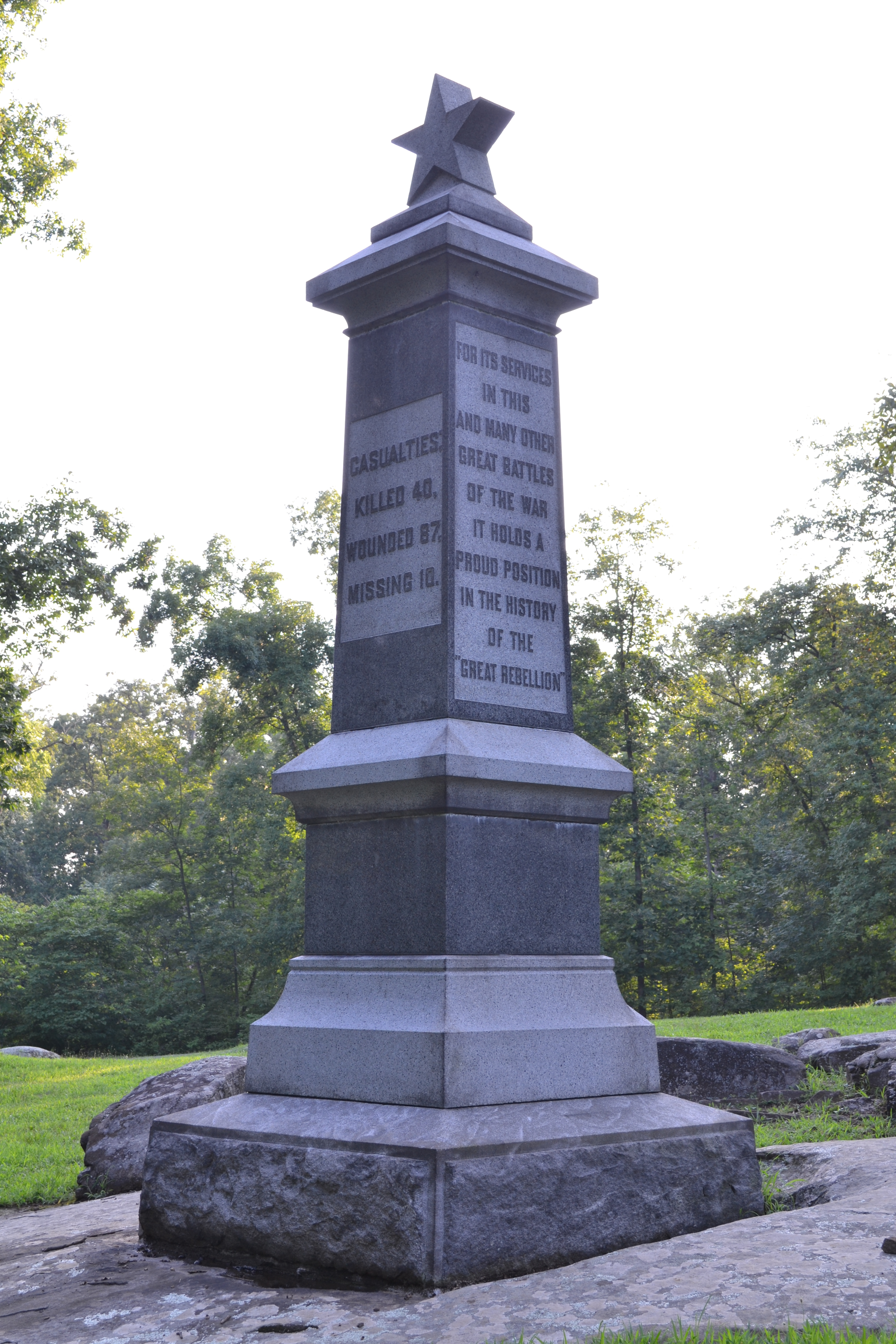
New York Infantry monument at Gettysburg Battlefield

The 137th New York Infantry Regiment was an infantry regiment in the Union Army during the American Civil War. It is famous for accomplishing a similar feat to the 20th Maine Infantry Regiment during the Battle of Gettysburg on the second day at the other end of the United States' line.

== Service ==
The 137th New York Infantry was organized at Binghamton, New York beginning August 31, 1862 and mustered in for three years service on September 25, 1862 under the command of Colonel David Ireland.

The regiment was attached to 2nd Brigade, 1st Division, XII Corps, Army of the Potomac, to October 1862. 4th Brigade, 1st Division, XII Corps, October 1862. 3rd Brigade, 2nd Division, XII Corps, Army of the Potomac, to October 1863, and Army of the Cumberland to April 1864. 3rd Brigade, 2nd Division, XX Corps, Army of the Cumberland, to June 1865.

The 137th New York Infantry mustered out of service June 9, 1865. Recruits and veterans were transferred to the 102nd New York Volunteer Infantry on June 1, 1865.

== Detailed service ==
Left New York for Washington, D.C., September 25, 1862. Moved to Harpers Ferry, Va., September 27–30, 1862. Duty at Bolivar Heights until December. Reconnaissance to Rippon, Va., November 9. Charlestown November 9. Reconnaissance to Winchester December 2–6. Charlestown and Berryville December 2. March to Fredericksburg, Va., December 9–16. At Fairfax Station until April 27, 1863. "Mud March" January 20–24. Chancellorsville Campaign April 27-May 6. Battle of Chancellorsville May 1–5.

Gettysburg Campaign June 11-July 24. The 137th New York played a pivotal part in the Battle of Gettysburg. It was this unit that on the night of July 2, repulsed the Confederate attack on the previously abandoned works on Culp's Hill. They were the extreme right flank of the Union lines on that night. Stretched at double interval, there were times where the unit was taking fire from three sides.

Pursuit of Lee to Manassas Gap, Va., July 5–24. Duty on line of the Rappahannock until September. Movement to Bridgeport, Ala., September 24-October 4. Reopening Tennessee River October 26–29. Battle of Wauhatchie, Tenn., October 28–29. Chattanooga-Ringgold Campaign November 23–27. Lookout Mountain November 23–24. Missionary Ridge November 25. Ringgold Gap, Taylor's Ridge, November 27. Duty at Bridgeport until May 1864. Atlanta Campaign May 1-September 8. Demonstration on Rocky Faced Ridge May 8–11. Battle of Resaca May 14–15. Near Cassville May 19. Advance on Dallas May 22–25. New Hope Church May 25. Battles about Dallas, New Hope Church, and Allatoona Hills May 26-June 5. Operations about Marietta and against Kennesaw Mountain June 10-July 2. Pine Hill June 11–14, Lost Mountain June 15–17. Gilgal or Golgotha Church June 15. Muddy Creek June 17. Noyes' Creek June 19. Kolb's Farm June 22. Assault on Kennesaw June 27. Ruff's Station, Smyrna Camp Ground, July 4. Chattahoochie River July 5–17. Peachtree Creek July 19–20. Siege of Atlanta July 22-August 25. Operations at Chattahoochie River Bridge August 26-September 2. Occupation of Atlanta September 2-November 15. Expedition to Tuckum's Cross Roads October 26–29. Near Atlanta November 9. March to the sea November 15-December 10. Near Davisboro November 28. Siege of Savannah December 10–21. Carolinas Campaign January to April 1865. Averysboro, N.C., March 16. Battle of Bentonville March 19–21. Occupation of Goldsboro March 24. Advance on Raleigh April 9–13. Occupation of Raleigh April 14. Bennett's House April 26. Surrender of Johnston and his army. March to Washington, D.C., via Richmond, Va., April 29-May 19. Grand Review of the Armies May 24.

== Casualties ==
The regiment lost a total of 294 men during service; 6 officers and 121 enlisted men killed or mortally wounded, 4 officers and 163 enlisted men died of disease. 26.4% of the 1,111 men who were in the regiment would die during their time of service.

== Commanders ==
- Colonel (United States) David Ireland
- Lieutenant Colonel Koert S. Van Voorhees - received a brevet promotion to colonel on March 13, 1865

== See also ==
- List of New York Civil War regiments
- New York in the Civil War
