= Robert H. Milroy =

American lawyer (1816–1890)

Robert Huston Milroy
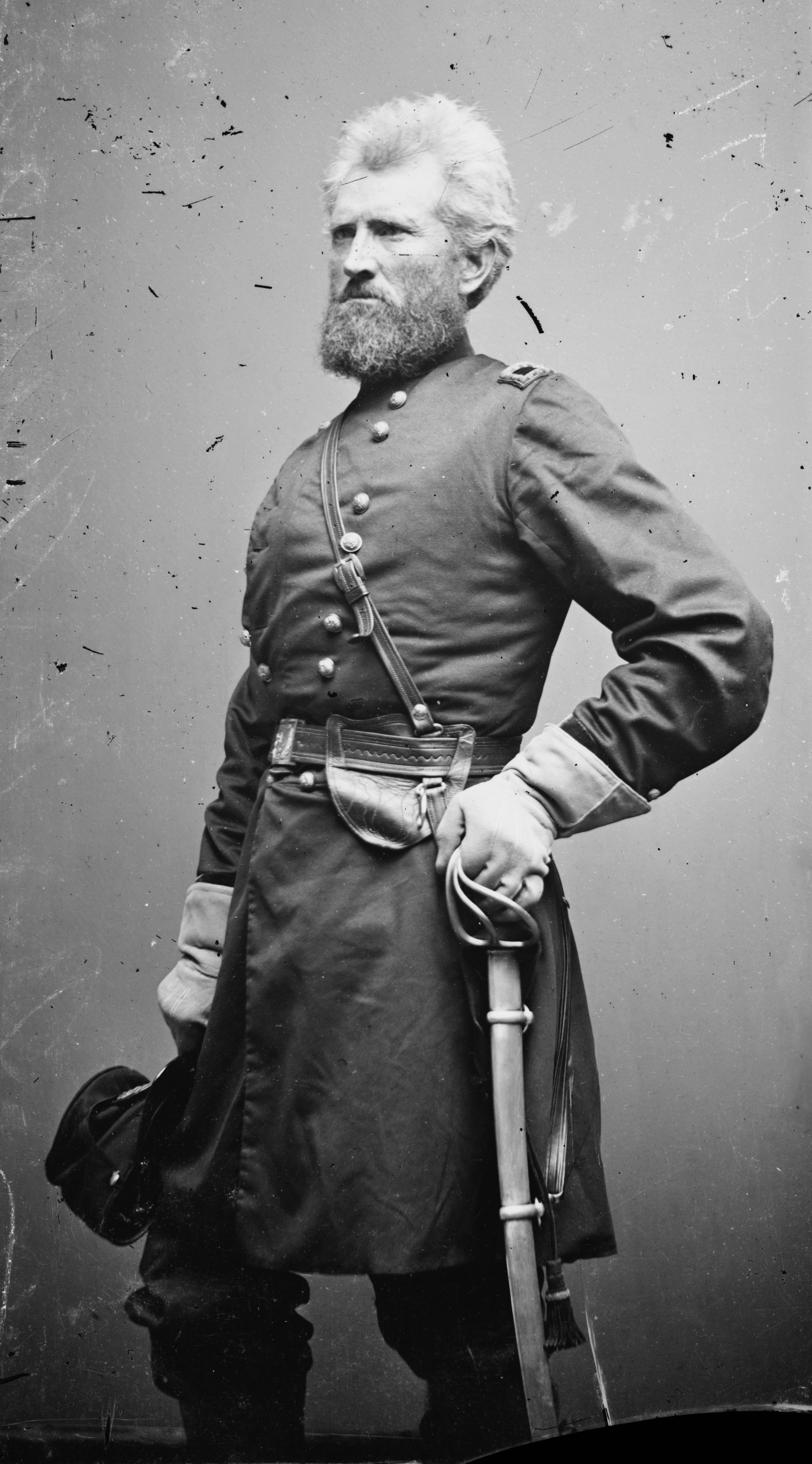
- Robert H. Milroy during the war
- Born: June 11, 1816 near Salem, Indiana
- Died: March 29, 1890 (aged 73); Olympia, Washington
- Burial place: Masonic Memorial Park, Tumwater, Washington
- Military career
- Allegiance: United States of America; Union
- Branch: United States Army; Union Army
- Service years: 1846–1847; 1861–1865
- Rank: Major General
- Nickname: "the Gray Eagle"
- Commands: 9th Indiana Infantry Regiment
- Conflicts: American Civil War: Battle of Rich Mountain; Battle of McDowell; Second Battle of Winchester; Third Battle of Murfreesboro

Robert Huston Milroy (June 11, 1816 – March 29, 1890) was an Indiana lawyer and judge who became a Union Army general in the American Civil War and later Indian agent in Washington State.

== Early life and education ==
Milroy was born on a farm near the hamlet of Canton, five miles east of Salem in Washington County in southern Indiana. His ancestors had fought at the Battle of Culloden before emigrating to Pennsylvania, and his grandfather, Samuel Milroy had fought as a private in the American Revolutionary War. His father, Samuel Milroy (1780–1849) had been born in Mifflin County, Pennsylvania but his father died in 1791, so he and his brother John were trained as apprentices, Samuel as a carpenter. The brothers moved to northern New York state in 1800, where they were to receive land near the Erie Canal in exchange for surveying, but ended up being swindled and returned to central Pennsylvania. Samuel Milroy married Frances Alexander (1781–1806) in Centre County, Pennsylvania. She bore a daughter and a son before her death. The son (this man's eldest half brother), Henry Bruce Milroy, would become the first sheriff of Carroll County, Indiana and later also served as a state legislator. Samuel Milroy then married Isabel Huston, second cousin of Samuel Houston in 1808, moved to Nelson County, Kentucky in 1809. She bore a son John Huston Milroy before her death, who would also serve several terms as an Indiana state legislator but have a less distinguished military career than his man. Samuel Milroy the married her sister Martha Patsy Huston, on August 31, 1810. That marriage produced ten children, including this boy Robert. While in Nelson County, Samuel Milroy operated keel boats on the Ohio River and also became a militia officer. His involvement in the War of 1812 began as the Kentucky militia unsuccessfully chased a band of Native Americans who had destroyed the Pigeon Roost settlement in Scott County, Indiana. By 1815 Samuel Milroy moved his family across the Ohio River to Washington County, Indiana, where he farmed, worked as a blacksmith and also began a legislative and military career which included participation in the new state's constitutional convention in Corydon. Samuel Milroy received Indiana militia commissions as a major in 1816, colonel in 1817, and became Brigadier-General of the 9th Indiana Militia in 1819. He would help host General Lafayette on his American tour in 1824–1825. Meanwhile, Samuel Milroy also began a state legislative career (opposing Whig internal improvements) and fellow legislators elected him Speaker of the Indiana House in 1821. He won election to the Indiana Senate (serving from 1823 to 1825) and was an unsuccessful candidate for lieutenant governor in 1824. Samuel Milroy had been the first man to float flat boats down the Muscatatuck River (then the Ohio and then Mississippi Rivers) to the Port of New Orleans.

When Robert Milroy was a 10-year-old boy in 1826, Samuel Milroy moved his family to central Indiana, and helped found Carroll County the next year. Samuel Milroy laid out Delphi in 1828, as later noted by a historic marker. A friend of Andrew Jackson, Samuel Milroy served as a delegate to the first Democratic National Convention in Philadelphia, would later serve on the Board of Visitors of West Point. He was also one of two U.S. commissioners at the Treaty of the Wabash in 1840. Samuel Milroy also represented Carroll and Clinton counties in the Indiana legislature in the 1830s. President Van Buren named him as Indian Agent to the Miami and Potawatomi Tribes in 1839, and although he was replaced by President Tyler (a Whig), President Polk renewed the appointment in 1845, shortly before Gen. Samuel Milroy died of erysipelas (his eldest son Henry would also die of the same fungal disease that year).

Meanwhile, Robert Milroy traveled to Vermont for higher education, financed by an uncle because of his father's opposition to such book learning. He graduated from the Norwich Military Academy in 1843, then returned to central Indiana for legal studies at Indiana University Law School in Bloomington.

=== Mexican-American War ===
Milroy interrupted his legal studies and moved to Texas in 1845. A captain in the 1st Indiana Volunteers during the Mexican War, he did not see any combat action.

=== Legal career ===
Returning to central Indiana in 1847, he graduated with an LLB from the Indiana University Law School. Admitted to the Indiana bar, he set up a legal practice in Delphi. He then moved to northwest Indiana and became a lawyer and judge in Rennsalaer, Jasper County, Indiana. Robert Milroy then followed his father's and brothers' political career, and served as a member of the Indiana Constitutional Convention in 1850–51, then became judge of Indiana's eighth judicial circuit court.

== Civil War ==
Just before Abraham Lincoln was inaugurated, Milroy recruited a company for the 9th Indiana Militia with men living around Rensselaer and was appointed its captain soon after Fort Sumter. On April 27, 1861, he accepted a Federal appointment as colonel of the 9th Indiana Infantry. He fought in the western Virginia campaign under Maj. Gen. George B. McClellan. In July 1861, he participated in the Battle of Rich Mountain in Randolph County, one of the counties that disagreed with Virginia's secession and was attempting (ultimately successfully) to form the state of West Virginia.

Promoted to brigadier general on September 3, 1861, Milroy commanded the Cheat Mountain District of the Mountain Department as a brigade commander under Gen. Robert Schenck. As 1862 began, Confederate Maj.Gen. Stonewall Jackson'had begun his Valley Campaign to distract Federal forces who were heading toward Richmond from the coast.

On May 9, 1862, although outnumbered when Confederate reinforcements under Brig.Gen. Edward Johnson arrived, Milroy led Union forces in the Battle of McDowell on the strategic Staunton and Parkersburg Turnpike against Gen. "Allegheny" Johnson and Maj. Gen. Thomas J. "Stonewall" Jackson. Milroy's "spoiling attack" surprised Jackson; he had seized the initiative, and inflicted heavier casualties, but did not drive the Confederates from their position by nightfall, when a strategic retreat was ordered.

Milroy also led a brigade at the Battle of Cross Keys on June 8, 1862. His brigade consisted of 5 Virginia regiments loyal to the Union (later designated as West Virginia units,) 1 Ohio regiments and 3 Ohio artillery batteries.

He commanded another brigade in Maj. Gen. John Pope's Army of Virginia for the Second Battle of Bull Run. Facing Jackson once again; Milroy leading his brigade into a gap in the Confederate line, and managed to surprise the brigade of Brig. Gen Isaac Trimble. However, when Confederate reinforcements arrived, Milroy's brigade was driven back, having lost 300 men in the process.

Milroy commanded the 2nd Division of the VIII Corps, Middle Department, from February 1863 until June. His promotion to major general occurred on March 10, 1863, but the rank related back to November 29, 1862.

The low point of Milroy's military career came during the early days of the Gettysburg campaign. During the Second Battle of Winchester, he was outmaneuvered and "gobbled up" by the Confederate corps of Lt. Gen. Richard S. Ewell, the vanguard of Gen. Robert E. Lee's Army of Northern Virginia on its way north to invade Pennsylvania. Although ordered to withdraw his 6,900-man garrison from Winchester, Milroy chose to remain in the face of the Confederate invasion, assuming that Winchester's fortifications would withstand any assault or siege.

General-in-chief Henry W. Halleck never favored this "forward" position, so far from the Baltimore and Ohio Railroad, and he wanted Milroy to withdraw his 6,900-man garrison from Winchester. The commander of VIII Corps, Major General Robert Schenck, was seemingly undecided and gave contradicting orders on the evacuation of Winchester, as Milroy convinced Schenck that he could hold Winchester and its extensive fortifications against any Confederate invasion, for months if necessary. Schenck capitulated and left Milroy with a final telegram to wait further orders. The telegraph wire into Winchester was cut by Confederate raiders.

As Ewell's Confederate Second Corps closed in on Winchester, Milroy was further blinded because his vedettes and pickets were not extensively placed in the surrounding territory, due to heavy and repeated bushwhacking of his men. Thus, he never realized that an entire Confederate corps was bearing down upon him. A Presbyterian and abolitionist, Milroy believed that eradicating slavery was God's will and that secessionists needed to be punished in an Old Testament fashion. However, his maltreatment of Winchester citizens had been such that even many pro-Unionists had changed their sympathies, serving to further isolate Milroy's ability to gather intelligence around him.

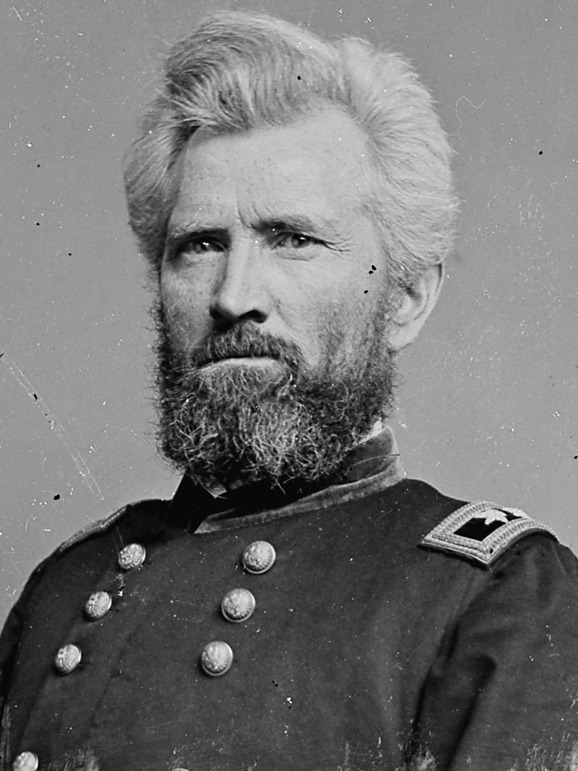
Major General Robert Milroy

On June 15, 1863, Milroy escaped with his staff, but over 3,000 of his men were captured, as were all of his artillery pieces and 300 supply wagons. He was called before a court of inquiry to answer for his actions, but after ten months was relieved of any culpability for the debacle.

During the attack on Winchester, Milroy's horse was hit by an exploding shell. Thrown from the saddle, he bruised his left hip in the process, but did not seek any medical attention and instead merely mounted another horse. However, that injury would continue to nag him for the rest of his life.

After this period of inactivity, Milroy was transferred to the Western Theater, recruiting for Maj. Gen. George Henry Thomas's Army of the Cumberland in Nashville in the spring of 1864. Much like in western Virginia, Milroy gained a reputation for his harsh treatment of civilians and frequent banishments and public executions of those who expressed pro-Confederate sympathies. He also commanded the Defenses of the Nashville and Chattanooga Railroad in the Department of the Cumberland until the end of the war. Although it was not anticipated that this would be a combat assignment, he fought briefly in the Third Battle of Murfreesboro, part of the Franklin-Nashville Campaign in 1864. Anxious to reduce some of the stigma of Winchester, he ordered the 13th Indiana Cavalry to make a mounted charge directly at an enemy artillery position, assuming that it was only a portion of Maj. Gen. Nathan Bedford Forrest's dismounted cavalry. The Hoosiers suffered heavy casualties. When Milroy realized that he was facing not cavalry, but an infantry division of Maj. Gen. Benjamin F. Cheatham's corps, he returned to the safety of "Fortress Rosecrans" in Murfreesboro. The following day General Lovell H. Rousseau, commander of all Union forces in the Murfreesboro area, reinforced Milroy with two infantry brigades. Milroy attacked and routed the combined Confederate infantry and cavalry. The battle was "well conducted by Maj. Gen. Milroy" in the words of General Rousseau. Milroy resigned his commission on July 26, 1865.

== Postbellum career ==
After the war, Milroy became a trustee of the Wabash and Erie Canal Company.

He moved to the Washington Territory in 1872 after and accepting a position as superintendent of Indian Affairs there. Although that post ended after three years, Milroy remained in Washington as an Indian agent for a decade. During this time, he helped ensure that the aging Yakama chief, Kamiakin, would not be evicted from his ancestral land by area ranchers.

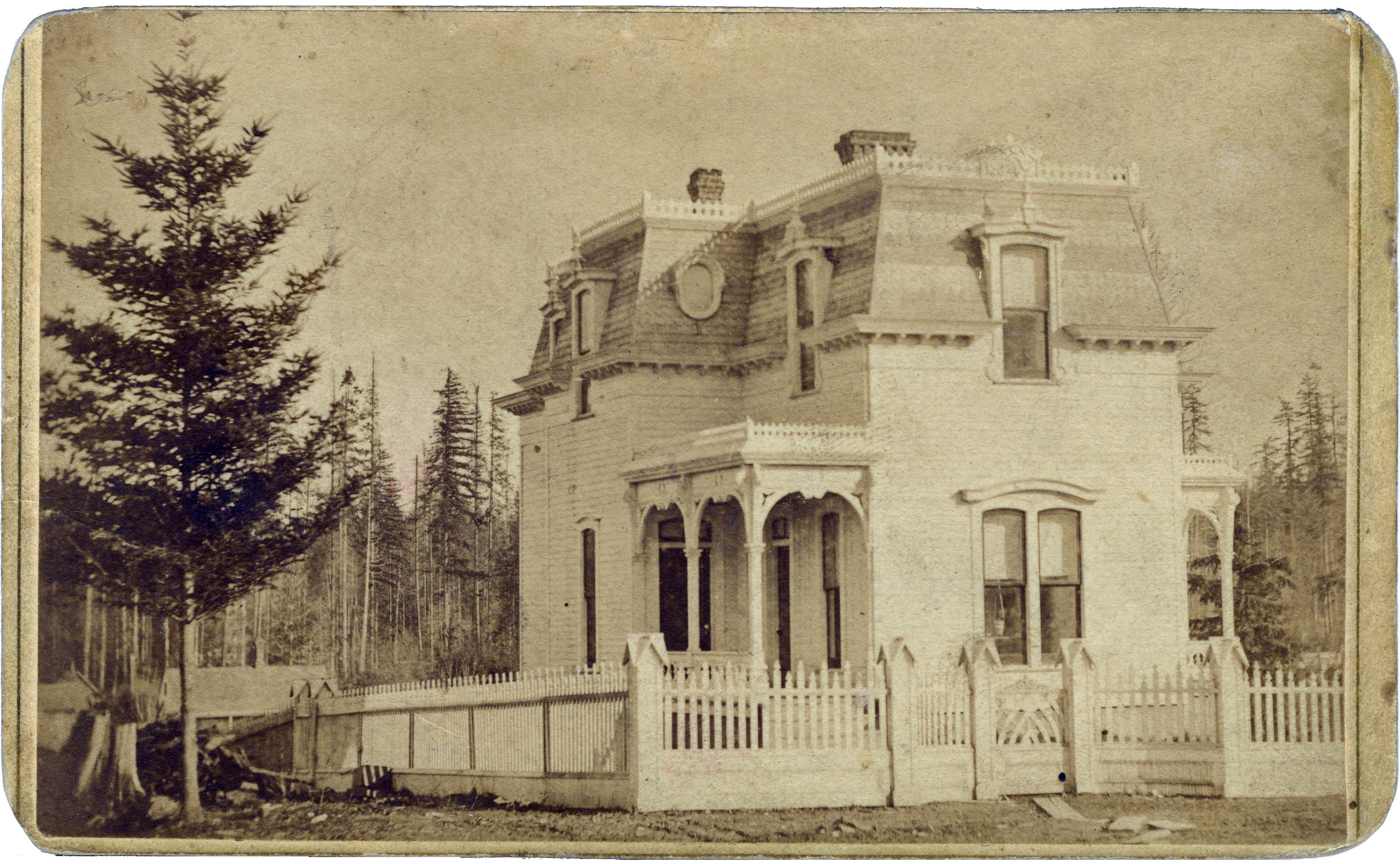
Robert's home in Olympia, Washington purchased for $5,500 circa 1872.

However, Milroy continued to suffer the effects of his wartime military service, and the hip injury he suffered at Winchester proved not only painful, but worsened over time, impairing his mobility such that he had to use a cane. Doctors diagnosed his condition as chronic inflammation of the ligaments around the hip joint.

== Death and legacy ==
Milroy died from heart failure in Olympia, Washington on May 29, 1890, and is buried in the Masonic Memorial Park at Tumwater, Washington.

His Papers of General Robert Huston Milroy, were published posthumously in 1965 and 1966. Many are made available online through the Jasper County Public Library of Indiana, as well as the Orbis Cascade Alliance of Washington.

== Commemoration ==
Milroy is the namesake of the city of Milroy, Minnesota.

== See also ==
- List of American Civil War generals (Union)
- White Top, on which Fort Milroy — named for the General — was emplaced.
