= Edward Johnson (general) =

Confederate Army officer in the American Civil War

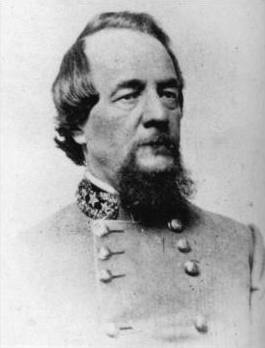
- Born: April 16, 1816; Midlothian, Virginia, U.S.
- Died: February 2, 1873 (aged 56); Richmond, Virginia, U.S.
- Burial place: Hollywood Cemetery (Richmond, Virginia)
- Military career
- Allegiance: United States of America; Confederate States of America
- Branch: United States Army; Confederate States Army
- Service years: 1838–1861 (USA); 1861–1865 (CSA)
- Rank: Major (USA); Major General (CSA)
- Nicknames: "Allegheny" Johnson "Old Clubby"
- Unit: 6th U.S. Infantry
- Commands: 12th Georgia Infantry; Army of the Northwest; Johnson's Division
- Conflicts: Mexican–American War; Seminole Wars; Utah War; American Civil War

Edward "Allegheny" Johnson (April 16, 1816 – March 2, 1873) was a United States Army officer and Confederate general in the American Civil War. Highly rated by Robert E. Lee, he was made a divisional commander under Richard S. Ewell. On the first evening of the Battle of Gettysburg (July 1, 1863), Ewell missed his opportunity to attack Cemetery Hill, and Johnson opted against attacking Culp's Hill, for which he had a discretionary order, though he attempted this on the second and third days. Ewell and Johnson are blamed by many for the loss of this decisive battle.

== Early life ==
Johnson was born in 1816 on Salisbury Plantation near current-day Midlothian in Chesterfield County, Virginia. His maternal grandfather owned the plantation, but his father was a doctor and initially raised his young family in Kentucky. He had a slightly elder brother, Philip Johnson, who inherited the Salisbury plantation before 1860 and operated it with the help of a younger man and enslaved labor. Johnson attended the United States Military Academy and graduated (after five years of study) in 1838.

== Early military career ==
Commissioned a brevet second lieutenant in the 6th U.S. Infantry, Johnson was promoted to first lieutenant in less than a year. Sent to Florida, he fought native Americans in the Seminole Wars 1838-1841, then was posted in the West.

In the Mexican–American War, Johnson distinguished himself for action at Veracruz, Cerro Gordo, Churubusco, Molino del Rey, and Chapultepec. He received two brevet promotions, to captain after Molino del Rey, and major after Chapultepec. Virginia also awarded him a ceremonial sword for his bravery. Johnson returned to duty on the Western frontier, serving in the Dakota Territory, California, Kansas, and on the Utah Expedition.

== Civil War ==
After the outbreak of the Civil War, Johnson resigned his United States Army commission and received the rank of colonel in the 12th Georgia Infantry on July 2, 1861. The 12th Georgia fought in Gen. Robert E. Lee's first campaign in western Virginia, at the Battle of Greenbrier River. He was promoted to brigadier general on December 13, 1861. He was ordered to defend Allegheny mountain, where a route from Cheat Mountain passed southwards then east over the mountain and to Shenandoah valley. His position was strong but still overextended. He was eventually ordered to retreat to a better position on Valley Mountain, but before making the move his forces (six regiments) were struck on their position by a surprise attack of Union forces who were based on Cheat Mountain, some distance northwards. This force was commanded by union general Robert Milroy, who would become Johnson's nemesis. (This brigade-sized force was given the grandiose name "Army of the Northwest".)

=== Valley Campaign ===
In the winter of 1861–62, Johnson's army cooperated with Maj. Gen. Thomas J. "Stonewall" Jackson in the early stages of Jackson's Valley Campaign. While Jackson marched his army into the mountains of the present-day Eastern Panhandle of West Virginia to conduct raids on the Baltimore and Ohio Railroad, Johnson was tasked with protecting against a Union invasion of the "upper," more elevated areas of the Shenandoah Valley near Staunton, Virginia. His Army of the Northwest constructed a series of breastworks and trenches atop Shenandoah Mountain which they named simply Fort Edward Johnson. At the Battle of McDowell, Johnson was severely wounded with a bullet to the ankle, which took a long time to heal. He returned to Richmond for his convalescence and remained there for nearly a year, active in the social scene. Although Johnson was a heavy-set, rough-looking, rude character who was still a bachelor at age 47, he had the reputation of a ladies' man. Due to a wound he received in Mexico, he was afflicted with an eye that winked uncontrollably, causing many women to believe he was flirting with them. He caused enough attention that he rated mentions in the famous diary of Mary Chesnut.

=== Stonewall division ===
In 1863, following the reorganization of the Army of Northern Virginia to compensate for the death of Stonewall Jackson after the Battle of Chancellorsville, Johnson was promoted to major general and given command of the "Stonewall Division" in Lt. Gen. Richard S. Ewell's Second Corps. Robert E. Lee had become dissatisfied with the previous commander at the battle and summoned Johnson back from medical leave to take the command.

=== Gettysburg ===
By May 1863, Johnson had recovered enough to lead his division in the Gettysburg campaign. He still needed a heavy hickory stick to move around on foot (and was known to use it against men he believed were shirking battle) and his men nicknamed him "Old Clubby". On the way north into Pennsylvania as part of the left wing (under command of Ewell) that passed across the Shenandoah valley, Johnson's command participated in defeating Union troops fortified at the city of Winchester, commanded by Johnson's old nemesis Maj. Gen. Robert H. Milroy at the Second Battle of Winchester. Johnson arrived at the Battle of Gettysburg on the evening of the first day, July 1, 1863. In a move that is still controversial, Ewell did not take advantage of Johnson's division and attack Cemetery Hill immediately that evening, when it might have been decisive. Johnson controversially declined to attack Culp's Hill that evening, for which he had a discretionary order. Instead, Johnson's division was the primary force that attacked Culp's Hill on the second and third days, suffering considerable casualties assaulting this impregnable position multiple times with no lasting success. In the fall of 1863, Johnson played a prominent role in the Mine Run Campaign.

=== Later war service ===
In the Overland Campaign of 1864, Johnson fought well at the Battle of the Wilderness and when Lt. Gen. James Longstreet was seriously wounded there, Robert E. Lee considered Johnson as a replacement corps commander. During the Battle of Spotsylvania Court House, on May 12, 1864, at the "Bloody Angle" section of the Confederate "Mule Shoe" defensive line, Johnson was captured along with Brig. Gen. George H. Steuart, and most of Johnson's division. He was imprisoned for months at Morris Island, off the coast of Charleston, South Carolina, and was exchanged on August 3, 1864. He was sent west to join Lt. Gen. John Bell Hood's Army of Tennessee, where he commanded a division in the corps of Lt. Gen. Stephen D. Lee. During the Franklin-Nashville Campaign, Johnson was captured again at the Battle of Nashville on December 16, 1864. He again spent months in a Union prisoner of war camp at Johnson's Island, in Lake Erie. At the end of the war, Johnson was moved to the Old Capitol Prison in Washington, D.C., where he was accused of being somehow complicit in the assassination of Abraham Lincoln. Nothing came of the accusation and he was paroled on July 22, 1865.

== Postbellum life ==
After the war, Johnson returned to Chesterfield County, Virginia and farmed with his brother, and an elderly women kept house for them. He also became active in Confederate veterans affairs, including early efforts to construct a monument to Robert E. Lee in Richmond.

== Death and legacy ==
He died in Richmond and his body lay in state in the state capital until he was buried at Hollywood Cemetery.

== See also ==
- List of American Civil War Generals (Confederate)
