= Battle of Chantilly order of battle: Confederate =

The following Confederate States Army units and commanders fought in the Battle of Chantilly of the American Civil War on September 1, 1862. The Union order of battle is shown separately.

== Abbreviations used ==
=== Military rank ===
- MG = Major General
- BG = Brigadier General
- Col = Colonel
- Ltc = Lieutenant Colonel
- Maj = Major
- Cpt = Captain

=== Other ===
- (k) = killed

== Army of Northern Virginia ==
=== Left Wing ===
MG Thomas Jackson

Division	Brigade	Regiments and Others
Jackson's Division; BG William E. Starke	Winder's Brigade Col Andrew J. Grigsby	2nd Virginia; 4th Virginia; 5th Virginia; 27th Virginia; 33rd Virginia
Jackson's Division; BG William E. Starke	Jones’ Brigade Col Bradley T. Johnson	21st Virginia; 42nd Virginia; 48th Virginia; 1st Virginia Battalion
Jackson's Division; BG William E. Starke	Taliaferro's Brigade Col Alexander G. Taliaferro	47th Alabama; 48th Alabama; 10th Virginia; 23rd Virginia; 37th Virginia
Jackson's Division; BG William E. Starke	Starke's Brigade Col Leroy A. Stafford	1st Louisiana; 2nd Louisiana; 9th Louisiana; 10th Louisiana; 15th Louisiana; Coppens' Louisiana Battalion
Jackson's Division; BG William E. Starke	Artillery Maj Lindsay M. Shumaker	2nd Baltimore Light Artillery; Allegheny (Virginia) Artillery; Hampden (Virginia) Artillery; Cutshaw's (Virginia) Battery; Rockbridge (Virginia) Artillery; Lynchburg "Lee" (Virginia) Artillery; Danville (Virginia) Artillery; 8th Star (Virginia) Artillery; Winchester (Virginia) Artillery
A. P. Hill's Light Division; MG Ambrose P. Hill	Branch's Brigade BG Lawrence O'Bryan Branch	7th North Carolina; 18th North Carolina; 28th North Carolina; 33rd North Carolina; 37th North Carolina
A. P. Hill's Light Division; MG Ambrose P. Hill	Anderson's (old) Brigade Col Edward L. Thomas	14th Georgia; 35th Georgia; 45th Georgia; 49th Georgia
A. P. Hill's Light Division; MG Ambrose P. Hill	Pender's Brigade BG William D. Pender	16th North Carolina; 22nd North Carolina; 34th North Carolina; 38th North Carolina
A. P. Hill's Light Division; MG Ambrose P. Hill	Gregg's Brigade BG Maxcy Gregg	1st South Carolina; 1st South Carolina (Orr's Rifles); 12th South Carolina; 13th South Carolina; 14th South Carolina
A. P. Hill's Light Division; MG Ambrose P. Hill	Archer's Brigade BG James J. Archer	5th Alabama Battalion; 19th Georgia; 1st Tennessee (Provisional Army); 7th Tennessee; 14th Tennessee
A. P. Hill's Light Division; MG Ambrose P. Hill	Field's Brigade Col John M. Brockenbrough	40th Virginia; 47th Virginia; 55th Virginia; 22nd Virginia Battalion
A. P. Hill's Light Division; MG Ambrose P. Hill	Artillery Ltc R. Lindsay Walker	Branch (North Carolina) Artillery; Pee Dee (South Carolina) Artillery; Crenshaw (Virginia) Artillery; Fredericksburg (Virginia) Artillery; Middlesex (Virginia) Artillery; Purcell (Virginia) Artillery; Letcher (Virginia ) Artillery
Ewell's Division; BG Alexander R. Lawton	Lawton's Brigade Col Marcellus Douglass	13th Georgia; 26th Georgia; 31st Georgia; 38th Georgia; 60th Georgia; 61st Georgia
Ewell's Division; BG Alexander R. Lawton	Trimble's Brigade Cpt William F. Brown (k); Col James A. Walker	15th Alabama; 12th Georgia; 21st Georgia; 21st North Carolina; 1st North Carolina Battalion Sharpshooters
Ewell's Division; BG Alexander R. Lawton	Early's Brigade BG Jubal A. Early	13th Virginia; 25th Virginia; 31st Virginia; 44th Virginia; 49th Virginia; 52nd Virginia; 58th Virginia
Ewell's Division; BG Alexander R. Lawton	Hays' Brigade Col Henry B. Strong	5th Louisiana; 6th Louisiana; 7th Louisiana; 8th Louisiana; 14th Louisiana
Ewell's Division; BG Alexander R. Lawton	Artillery Maj Alfred R. Courtney	D’Aquin's Guard (Louisiana) Artillery; Dement's (Maryland) Artillery; Chesapeake (Maryland) Artillery; Johnson's (Virginia) Artillery; Courtney (Virginia) Artillery; Staunton (Virginia) Artillery

=== Cavalry ===
Division	Brigade	Regiments and Others
Stuart's Division; MG J.E.B. Stuart	Robertson's Brigade BG Beverly H. Robertson	2nd Virginia; 6th Virginia; 7th Virginia; 12th Virginia; 17th Virginia Battalion
Stuart's Division; MG J.E.B. Stuart	Lee's Brigade BG Fitzhugh Lee	1st Virginia; 3rd Virginia; 4th Virginia; 5th Virginia; 9th Virginia
Stuart's Division; MG J.E.B. Stuart	Hampton's Brigade BG Wade Hampton	1st North Carolina; 2nd North Carolina; 10th Virginia; Cobb's (Georgia) Legion; Jeff Davis (Mississippi) Legion
Stuart's Division; MG J.E.B. Stuart	Horse Artillery	Hart's (South Carolina) Artillery; 1st Stuart (Virginia) Artillery
