= Battle of Chantilly order of battle =

The order of battle for the Battle of Chantilly includes:

- Battle of Chantilly order of battle: Confederate
- Battle of Chantilly order of battle: Union
