= Bethel Military Academy =

School in Fauquier County, Virginia (1867–1911)

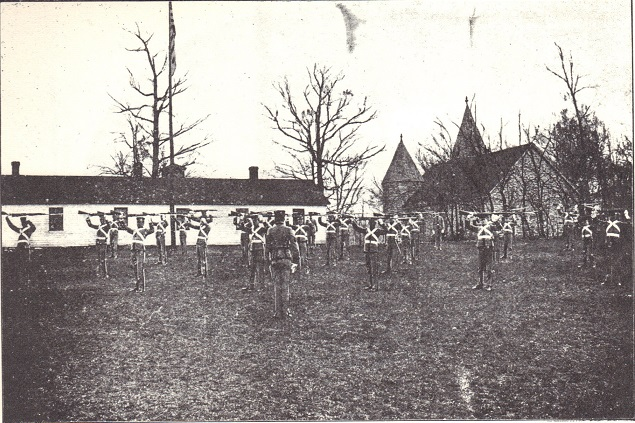
Parade ground of the Bethel Military Academy

Bethel Military Academy was a school near Warrenton, Virginia in Fauquier County. It operated from 1867 until 1911 and had several prominent alumni. The Virginia General Assembly passed a bill in 1901 incorporating the school. The bill included a requirement that one student chosen from each district of Virginia was granted tuition free admission to the school.

The 1896 Maryland Aggies football team played against Bethel Academy. Kappa Sigma Kappa fraternity had a branch at the school for a few years.

Buttons worn on a uniform from the school include the Virginia state seal of Virtus slaying the giant.

== Alumni ==
- John L. McLaurin, U.S. Representative
- Theodore G. Croft, U.S. Representative
- Charles W. Field, Maryland state delegate
- Leon Lydecker Freeman, local mayor and former owner of the Freeman House Store
- Grenville Gaines, mayor of Warrenton, Virginia
- Joseph Chappell Hutcheson Jr. (1879–1973), American judge and mayor of Houston
- Frank Owens Smith, U.S. Representative
- David D. Terry, U.S. Representative
- Howard W. Smith, U.S. Representative
- Lucien D. Starke Jr., president and publisher of the Norfolk Virginian-Pilot
