= Goober Peas =

Traditional folk song of the United States

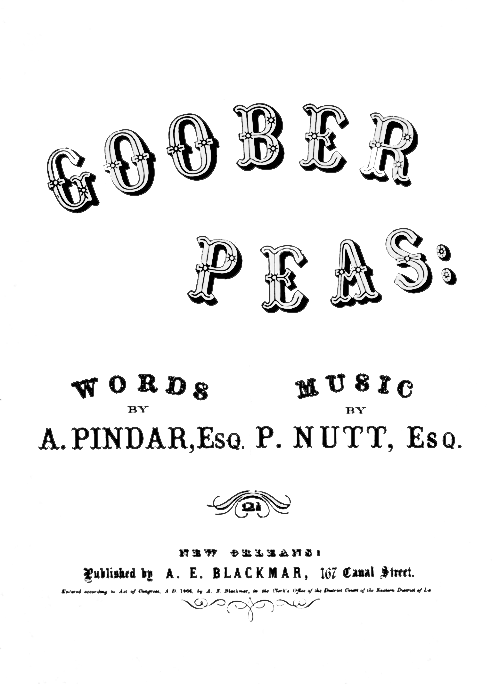
- Cover, sheet music, 1866

Song
- Language: English
- Published: first in 1866
- Composer: Unknown

"Goober Peas" is a traditional folk song probably originating in the Southern United States. It was popular with Confederate soldiers during the American Civil War, and is still sung frequently in the South to this day. It has been recorded and sung by scores of artists, including Burl Ives, Tennessee Ernie Ford, Rusty Draper and The Kingston Trio.

The lyrics of "Goober Peas" are a description of daily life during the latter part of the Civil War for Southerners. After being cut off from the rail lines and their farm land, they had little to eat aside from boiled peanuts (or "goober peas") which often served as an emergency ration. Peanuts were also known as pindars and goobers.

The earliest sheet music for the song was published in 1866, published by A. E. Blackmar in New Orleans. Blackmar humorously lists A. Pindar as the lyricist and P. Nutt as the composer.

== Lyrics ==
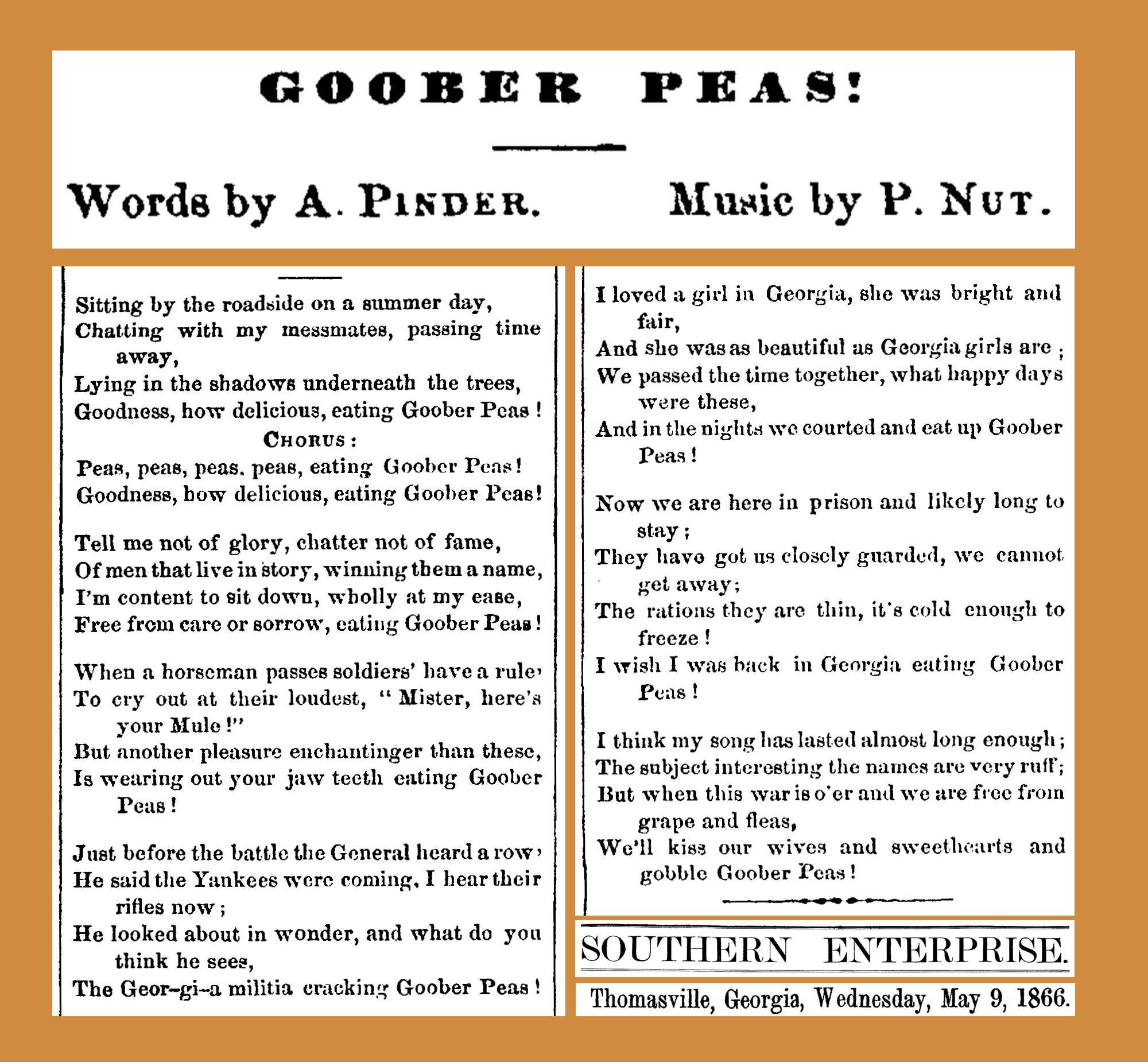
Lyrics as published in an 1866 Southern newspaper, humorously listing lyricist as "A. Pinder" (pindar being another word for peanut) and music by "P. Nut".

Verse 1

Sitting by the roadside on a summer's day
Chatting with my mess-mates, passing time away
Lying in the shadows underneath the trees
Goodness, how delicious, eating goober peas.

Chorus

Peas, peas, peas, peas
Eating goober peas
Goodness, how delicious,
Eating goober peas.
(Note: In the Tennessee Ernie Ford version, he sings the first two lines again at the end of the chorus.)

Verse 2

When a horse-man passes, the soldiers have a rule
To cry out their loudest, "Mister, here's your mule!"
But another custom, enchanting-er than these
Is wearing out your grinders, eating goober peas.
Chorus

Verse 3

Just before the battle, the General hears a row
He says "The Yanks are coming, I hear their rifles now."
He turns around in wonder, and what d'ya think he sees?
The 15th Alabama, eating goober peas.
Chorus

(Note: There sat the 15th Alabama, is reported in contemporary accounts)
(Note 2: Some people sing "The Georgia militia, eating goober peas")

Verse 4

I think my song has lasted almost long enough.
The subject's interesting, but the rhymes are mighty tough.
I wish the war was over, so free from rags and fleas
We'd kiss our wives and sweethearts, and gobble goober peas.
Chorus

Goober Peas

== Additional verse ==
The Reverend Wayland Fuller Dunaway recorded a stanza of the song he heard while imprisoned at the Union prison on Johnson's Island, Ohio, during the latter part of the Civil War. Dunaway had been a captain in Co. I, 40th Virginia Infantry, when he was captured during the Battle of Falling Waters in July 1863. His stanza:

But now we are in prison and likely long to stay,
The Yankees they are guarding us, no hope to get away;
Our rations they are scanty, 'tis cold enough to freeze,—
I wish I was in Georgia, eating goober peas.

Peas, peas, peas, peas,
Eating goober peas;

I wish I was in Georgia, eating goober peas.

—Stanza of a Prison Song.

== In popular culture ==
- In Veep Season 3 Episode 3 "Alicia", Mike is made to kneel and sing "Goober Peas" by Jonah in order to not publish a compromising story.
- In the Parks and Recreation Season 5 episode titled "Article Two," Patton Oswalt plays Garth Blundin, who challenges Leslie Knope to compete in a 1800s “roughing it” competition, at one point running through the background playing with a hoop-and-stick and singing “Goober Peas.”^{[5]}
- In M*A*S*H Season 6 Episode 13 "Comrades in Arms: Part One", Hawkeye and Margaret are sent to the 8063rd to demonstrate arterial transplant surgery. En route, Hawkeye sings "Gooder Peas", saying it's a Civil War song and he wants to act military. The lyrics "eating goobers peas" are substituted in this version.

== Bibliography ==
- Dunaway, Wayland Fuller. Reminiscences of a Rebel. New York: The Neale Publishing Company (1913).
- Pindar, A., Esq. (w.); Nutt, P., Esq. (m.). "Goober Peas" (sheet music). New Orleans : A.E. Blackmar (1866).
