= Skirmish at Cedar Lane =

1861 battle of the American Civil War

Coordinates: 37°2.448′N 76°29.165′W

- Part of the American Civil War
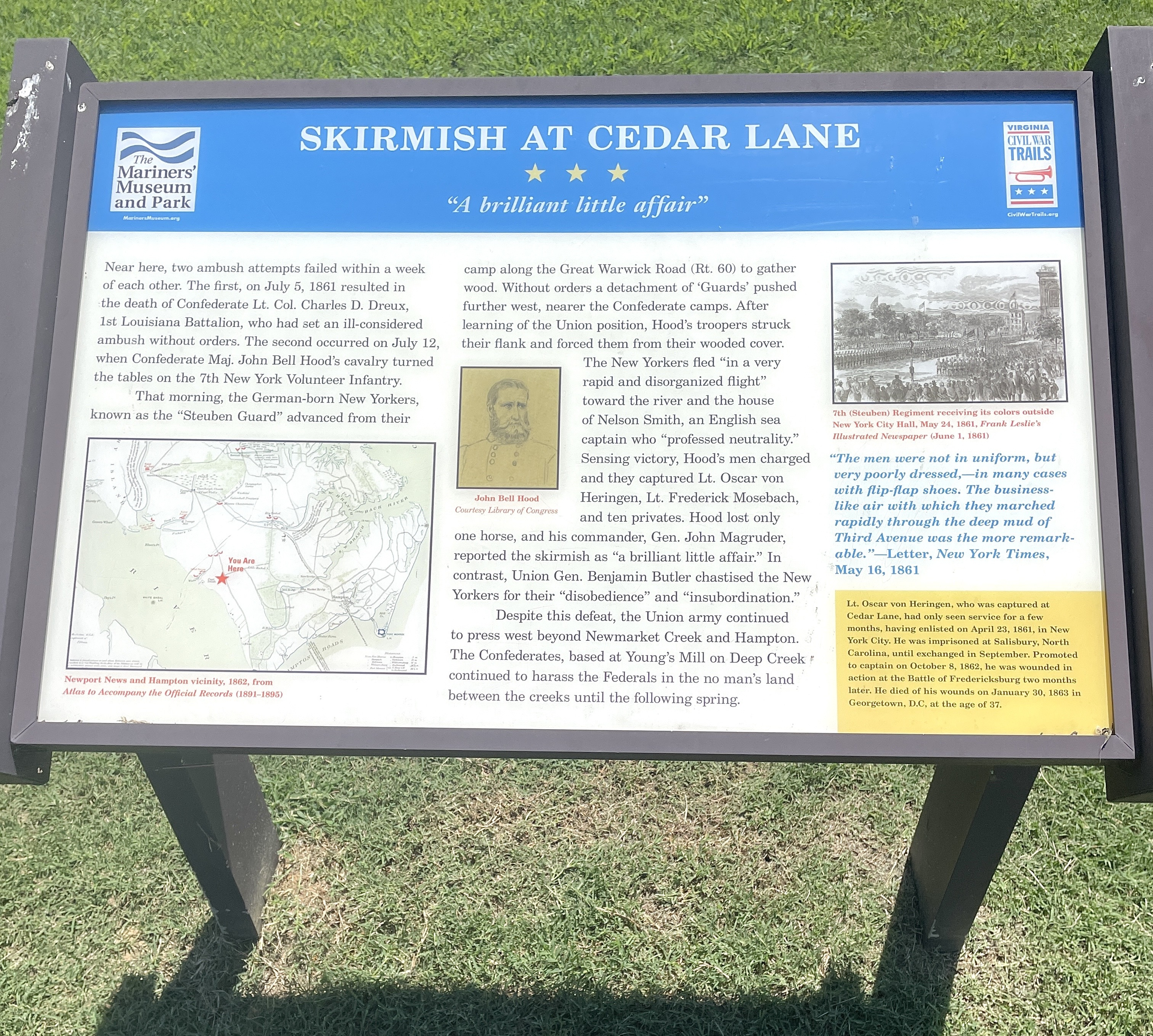
- Commemorative plaque at the site of the skirmish
Date	July 12, 1861
Location	Near Young’s Mill, Newport News, Virginia
Result	Confederate victory

Belligerents
United States	Confederate States

Commanders and leaders
Oscar Von Heringen (POW); Frederick Mosebach (POW)	John Bell Hood

Units involved
7th New York Infantry Regiment	3rd Virginia Cavalry Regiment

Strength
40+	125+

Casualties and losses
5 killed several wounded 12 captured	No casualties

The Skirmish at Cedar Lane was a Civil War skirmish fought near Newport News, Virginia on July 12, 1861, as part of the operations on the Virginia Peninsula. The skirmish was the first Civil War combat, and first victory, of future Confederate General John Bell Hood.

== Background ==
Following the Confederate victory at the Battle of Big Bethel, war on the Peninsula became a stalemate as both sides began to build fortifications. Both armies sent small patrols to forage for supplies and scout for enemy activity, but neither sought a decisive engagement.

On July 5, 1861, Confederate Lt-Col. Charles Dreux, commander of the 1st Louisiana Infantry Battalion, was killed at the Skirmish at Smith's Farm. Dreux was the first Confederate field officer killed in the Civil War, his death was mourned throughout the South, and many Confederate soldiers sought to avenge his death.

Confederate forces were camped at Young's Mill in Newport News, and eager for revenge, sought an opportunity for to engage the Federals. The commander of the Confederate cavalry in Newport News was Maj. John Bell Hood.

Early on the morning of July 12, Hood led a group of 125+ men from the 3rd Virginia Cavalry Regiment toward the Union lines near the southern tip of Newport News to scout and possibly engage the Federals.

== Order of Battle ==
=== Union ===
7th New York Infantry Regiment - Lt. Oscar Von Heringen (40+ men)

- Company E

=== Confederate ===
3rd Virginia Cavalry Regiment - Maj. John Bell Hood (125+ men)

- Old Dominion Dragoons - Capt. Jefferson Philips
- Charles City Cavalry - Capt. Robert Douthat
- Dinwiddie Cavalry - Capt. William Adams
- Cumberland Light Dragoons - Capt. Henry Johnson
- Mecklenburg Dragoons - Capt. Thomas Goode
- Black Walnut Dragoons - Capt. William Easley

== Skirmish ==
That same morning, 40+ men from Company E of the 7th New York left Camp Butler to forage for firewood. As the company searched the woods around Young's Mill for firewood, a detachment led by Lt. Von Heringen patrolled farther North without orders, closer to the Confederate lines. The men were spotted by Hood's cavalry scouts near Cedar Lane and Nelson Smith's farm just before noon. A second detachment under Lt. Mosebach remained with the rest of the company in the forest.

Hood mistook Von Heringen's patrol for a Union ambush and sent a detachment of 30 men, mostly from the Mecklenburg Dragoons, who were armed with Sharps breech-loading carbines, through the thick woods to confront the Federals. Flanking Von Heringen's group, Hood's men surprised Lt. Mosebach's detachment, and a sharp skirmish broke out in the woods. Mosebach ordered his men to regroup on the open ground near Nelson Smith's house.

In a later account, Hood recalled:

“The enemy having been driven from cover in a very rapid and disorderly flight in the direction of Captain Smith’s house, on the banks of James River, I then ordered a charge, and the detachments dashed gallantly down upon them, taking the flying enemy prisoners.”

With Mosebach's men surrounded by the Confederates, Von Heringen's patrol became cut off, and most of his men subsequently surrendered.

== Aftermath ==
Having escaped the skirmish, the remainder of Company E of the 7th New York retreated to Camp Butler to gather reinforcements. Lt-Col. Edward Kapff of the 7th New York gathered 200+ men of the regiment and returned to the scene of the skirmish but the Confederates and captured members of Company E had already departed.

4 Union soldiers were killed, 1 mortally wounded, and several slightly wounded. Lt. Von Heringen and Lt. Mosebach, with 10 enlisted men, were captured and taken prisoner by Maj. Hood and his men.

Despite this defeat, the Union army continued to press west beyond Newmarket Creek and Hampton. The Confederates, based at Young's Mill on Deep Creek continued to harass the Federals in the no man's land between the creeks until the following spring campaign.

The small victory brought Hood to the attention of many Confederate leaders, and added to his prestige.
