= John M. Brockenbrough =

Confederate Army officer in the American Civil War

John Mercer Brockenbrough
- Born: August 1, 1830; Richmond County, Virginia, U.S.
- Died: August 24, 1892 (aged 62); Richmond, Virginia, U.S.
- Burial place: Hollywood Cemetery (Richmond, Virginia)
- Spouse(s): Austina Brockenbrough (cousin); Kate Cornelia Mallory
- Military career
- Allegiance: Confederate States of America
- Branch: Confederate States Army
- Service years: 1861–1864 (CSA)
- Rank: Colonel (CSA)
- Commands: 40th Virginia Infantry (CSA)
- Conflicts: American Civil War

John Mercer Brockenbrough (August 1, 1830 – August 24, 1892) was a farmer and a colonel in the Confederate States Army during the American Civil War.

== Early life ==
Johnathan Brockenbrough, the son of Moore Fauntleroy Brockenbrough and his wife Sarah Waller Smith, was born August 1, 1830, in Richmond County, Virginia. John Brockenbrough was a second cousin of John White Brockenbrough and his sister, Civil War diarist, Judith White (Brockenbrough) McGuire. He graduated from the Virginia Military Institute in 1850.

== Civil War ==
At the start of the Civil War, Brockenbrough was appointed colonel of the 40th Virginia Infantry, which served attached to Brig. Gen. Charles W. Field's Virginia brigade in Maj. Gen. A.P. Hill's Light Division and later Maj. Gen. Henry Heth's division in the Third Corps, Army of Northern Virginia. Brockenbrough led his regiment through the Seven Days Battles, a punishing series of battles that caused 50% casualties in his regiment.

Brockenbrough assumed command of the brigade after Field was wounded at the Second Battle of Bull Run and led it two days later at Chantilly. During the Maryland Campaign, Brockenbrough took part in the capture of Harpers Ferry, and then marched with the rest of the Light Division to the rescue of Gen. Robert E. Lee's army at Sharpsburg; his brigade was deployed on the far right of A.P. Hill's line and did not see any direct action there. At Fredericksburg, his brigade was ordered to plug a hole in the Confederate line that was being exploited by Union troops under Maj. Gen. George G. Meade. Brockenbrough lost control of his brigade during this action and two of his regiments split off with him and never reached the fighting. Lee apparently was not impressed with Brockenbrough's leadership qualities. Even though months had passed, the unit was still called Field's Brigade and Brockenbrough was still considered its temporary commander. Lee did not recommend John for promotion.

In early 1863, Lee brought Brig. Gen. Henry Heth from assignment in Tennessee to replace Brockenbrough in command of the brigade (soon called "Heth's Brigade"), hoping to restore it to fighting shape. During the Battle of Chancellorsville, Heth took over command of the division when Hill was wounded on May 2, 1863, which meant that Brockenbrough was back in command of the brigade on May 3, when it lost around 300 men storming the enemy line. After the battle, Brockenbrough was given a rare commendation for leading the attack by General Heth. Brockenbrough remained in brigade command when Heth was promoted to command a new division.

At the Battle of Gettysburg, Brockenbrough's brigade was in the rear of Heth's column during the march on the Chambersburg Pike, July 1, 1863, and thus missed the morning attacks against the Union cavalry and the I Corps. In the afternoon attacks, his men advanced on a line with J. Johnston Pettigrew's North Carolina brigade, and although the latter brigade fought fiercely, suffering over a thousand casualties, Brockenbrough's brigade was hesitant and fought ineffectively against the Pennsylvanians of Col. Roy Stone and a portion of the Iron Brigade, as may be inferred from their casualty rate of 100. The brigade rested on July 2, but on July 3 participated in the bloody assault known as Pickett's Charge. There is no record that Brockenbrough marched with his men toward Cemetery Ridge that day, however, and Col. Robert M. Mayo of the 47th Virginia Infantry was in temporary command. It is possible that the death of Brockenbrough's brother during the battle on July 1 left him distraught and unable to step up to his responsibilities. Assigned to the far left flank of Pettigrew's divisional line, the brigade was subjected to heavy shelling from Union artillery on Cemetery Hill and when the 8th Ohio Infantry came up on their left flank, the Virginians turned and ran.

During the Confederate retreat back to Virginia, Brockenbrough attempted to reclaim some of his damaged reputation by making a reckless advance against Union troops at Falling Waters on July 14, suffering numerous casualties. Five days later, Brockenbrough's former regimental lieutenant colonel, Brig. Gen. Henry Harrison Walker, was given command of the brigade, returning Brockenbrough to the 40th Virginia, which he led at Bristoe and Mine Run. On January 21, 1864, Brockenbrough resigned from the Confederate States Army. He retained his rank of colonel in the reserves until late 1864.

== Postbellum life ==
After the war, Brockenbrough lived in Norfolk and Richmond.
