= 40th Virginia Infantry Regiment =

- Flag of Virginia, 1861
- Active: June 1861 – April 1865
- Disbanded: April 1865
- Country: Confederacy
- Allegiance: Confederate States of America
- Branch: Confederate States Army
- Type: Infantry
- Engagements: American Civil War: Seven Days' Battles; Battle of Cedar Mountain; Second Battle of Bull Run; Battle of Antietam; Battle of Fredericksburg; Battle of Chancellorsville; Battle of Gettysburg; Battle of Cold Harbor; Siege of Petersburg; Battle of Sayler's Creek; Appomattox Campaign

Commanders
- Notable commanders: Colonel John M. Brockenbrough

The 40th Virginia Infantry Regiment was an infantry regiment raised in Virginia for service in the Confederate States Army during the American Civil War. It fought mostly with the Army of Northern Virginia. Prior to the reorganization of the army after Chancellorsville, it was part of the first brigade of A.P. Hill's Light Division. Field officers were Colonel John M. Brockenbrough; Lieutenant Colonels Fleet W. Cox, Arthur S. Cunningham, and Henry H. Walker; and Majors Edward T. Stakes and William T. Taliaferro.

== Background ==
The 40th Virginia completed its organization in May 1861. Its members were recruited in Northumberland, Richmond, and Lancaster counties. After serving in the Aquia District, the unit was assigned to General Field's, Heth's, and H.H. Walker's Brigade, Army of Northern Virginia. It participated in the campaigns of the army from the Seven Days' Battles to Cold Harbor, then was involved in the Petersburg siege north of the James River and the Appomattox Campaign.

== Battles ==
It sustained 180 casualties during the Seven Days' Battles which was about half its effective force. The unit lost 4 wounded at Cedar Mountain, had 14 killed and 73 wounded at Chancellorsville, and of the 253 engaged at Gettysburg more than twenty percent were disabled. Many were captured at Sayler's Creek and only 7 men were included in the surrender on April 9, 1865.

A captain in Company I, while in a Union prison, recorded an additional stanza to the popular Confederate soldier song, Goober Peas.

== See also ==
- List of Virginia Civil War units
