= Grenville Gaines =

American politician and lawyer (1854–1922)

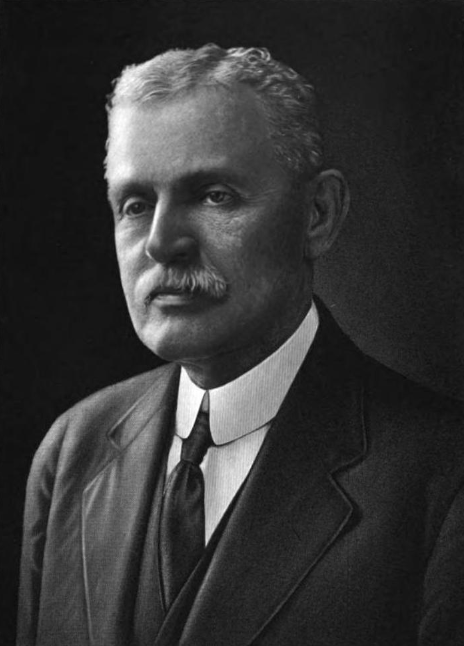
- Gaines in 1915 publication

Personal details
- Born: September 26, 1854 Warrenton, Virginia, U.S.
- Died: May 2, 1922 (aged 67) Warrenton, Virginia, U.S.
- Party: Democratic
- Spouse: Lizzie Taylor Harris (m. 1882)
- Children: 3
- Relatives: James Foster (grandfather)
- Education: Virginia Military Institute; University of Virginia School of Law (LLB)
- Occupation: Politician; lawyer; banker
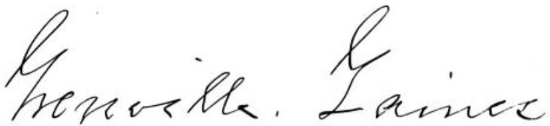
- Signature

Grenville Gaines (September 26, 1854 – May 2, 1922) was an American politician, lawyer and banker from Virginia. He served as mayor of Warrenton in the 1890s.

== Early life ==
Grenville Gaines was born on September 26, 1854, in Warrenton, Virginia, to Mary Mildred (née Foster) and William Henry Gaines. His grandfather James Foster was a planter in Prince William County and a Virginia state politician. He studied at Bethel Military Academy from 1869 to 1870. He attended Virginia Military Institute from 1870 to 1874 and graduated in the class of 1874 as a civil engineer. He graduated from the University of Virginia School of Law with a Bachelor of Laws in July 1876. He was then admitted to the bar.

== Career ==
Gaines started a law practice in Warrenton in 1876.

Gaines served as mayor of Warrenton for four terms, concluding in 1895. He was a member of the board of commissioners for the eighth district of Virginia for the World's Columbian Exposition in 1893. He served as a member of the school board in the Warrenton district. He operated a private banking business called "Gaines Brothers".

Gaines reorganized the military organization Warrenton Rifles. He was elected colonel of the Third Virginia Regiment of the National Guard on March 12, 1898. He volunteered on April 20, 1898, to serve in the Spanish–American War.

Gaines was a member of the state Democratic committee. He served as president of the telephone lines in Fauquier County in 1895. Gaines was a member of the board of visitors of the Virginia Military Institute from 1897 to 1900. He was appointed again to the board of visitors in 1916, in 1918, and served until his death.

== Personal life ==
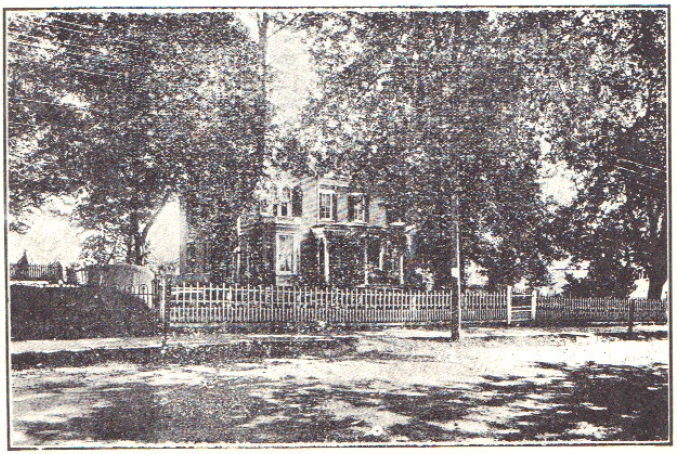
Home of Gaines in Warrenton

Gaines married Lizzie Taylor Harris, granddaughter of Surgeon General Thomas Harris, on November 15, 1882. They had three children, Mary Foster, William H. and Elizabeth Taylor. Gaines was a vestryman of the Protestant Episcopal Church.

Gaines died on May 2, 1922, at his home in Warrenton.
