= Battle of Devil's River =

- Part of the Comanche Wars, Texas-Indian Wars
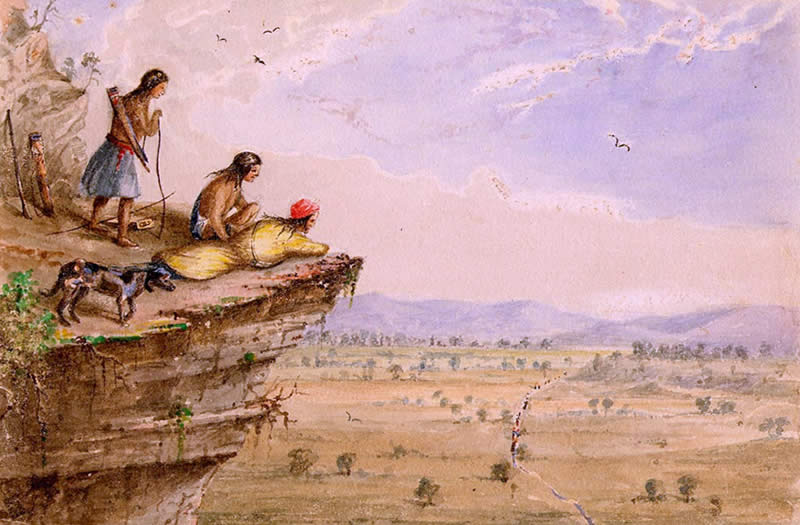
- Comanches watching an American caravan in West Texas by Arthur Lee Tracy.
Date	July 20, 1857
Location	Devils River, Val Verde, Texas 30°10′40.8612″N 101°5′34.85″W
Result	United States victory

Belligerents
United States	Comanche

Commanders and leaders
(United States) John Bell Hood (WIA)	Unknown

Strength
18 cavalry	~50 warriors

Casualties and losses
2 killed 5 wounded (7 dead from exposure)	9 killed 10 wounded
- Several Comanche women and children were captured during the battle but quickly released.
- Location within Texas

The Battle of Devil's River was an 1857 Indian War skirmish which took place in Texas along the Devils River. A small force of United States Army cavalry defeated an overwhelming force of Comanche braves after an epic journey across the desert.

== Battle ==
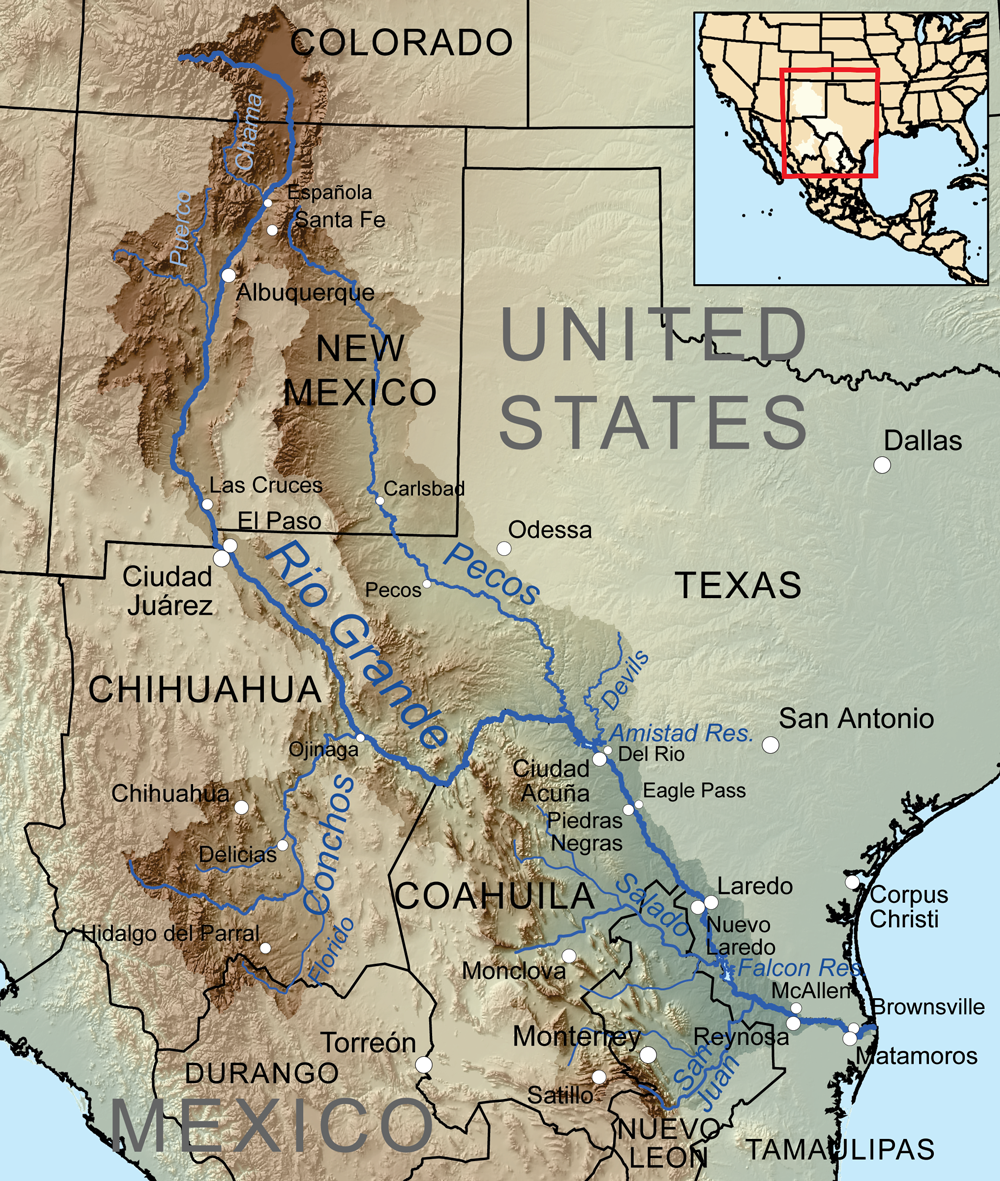
A map of the Rio Grande watershed, the Devil's River is in the center.

Lieutenant John Bell Hood, a future Confederate general left Fort Mason on July 5 of 1857 to patrol the desert with twenty-five men of the 2nd Cavalry. It was extremely hot but the soldiers continued on to the Concho River where they discovered tracks heading towards Mexico left by a war party. The trail led straight through a wasteland but Hood believed his men could survive in the desert, at least for a short while, if the Comanches could. After 150 miles with only a few sources of water, Hood began to think that catching the enemy would be impossible but still he pushed on. By the time the expedition found the Devil's River, seven men fell behind from heat exhaustion and were left to fend for themselves, none were seen again.

While nearing the river on July 20, a force of about fifty Comanches suddenly appeared in front of Hood and his seventeen remaining men, one of them carrying a white flag in their hand. Hood immediately galloped in the direction of the flag but after only thirty paces the Comanches opened fire and the flag was thrown to the ground. At the same time Comanches hidden among the brush also opened up shooting both arrows and rifles. Some of the natives charged and got so close to Hood and his men that they grabbed the reins of the cavalry horses and pulled down the soldiers. Lieutenant Hood fired his shotgun a few times before an arrow pinned his left hand to his horse's bridle. The enlisted men fired revolvers as they withdrew fifty yards back and prepared to defend the position. Later Hood said "We were nigh meeting a similar fate to that of the gallant Custer and his noble band", referring to the Battle of the Little Bighorn in 1876.

The Comanches assaulted the American position at that point but the cavalrymen held their ground, by this time they were dismounted to skirmish on the ground where there was cover. After a long engagement the Comanches gave up in the end, leaving nine men on the battlefield and ten others were wounded according to Hood's account. One American was killed in action and five others wounded, including Hood, one other man went missing during the fighting and was presumed dead.

== Historical Record ==
The battle of Devil's River site received a historic marker in 1987.

== See also ==
- Apache Wars
- Navajo Wars
