= 3rd Virginia Cavalry Regiment =

Confederate States Army unit

- Flag of Virginia, 1861
- Active: July 1861 – April 1865
- Disbanded: April 1865
- Country: Confederacy
- Allegiance: Confederate States of America
- Branch: Confederate States Army
- Role: Cavalry
- Engagements: Skirmish at Cedar Lane; Peninsula Campaign; Seven Days' Battles; Second Battle of Bull Run; Battle of Antietam; Battle of Fredericksburg; Battle of Chancellorsville; Battle of Brandy Station; Battle of Gettysburg; Bristoe Campaign; Overland Campaign; Siege of Petersburg; Valley Campaigns of 1864; Appomattox Campaign; Battle of Five Forks

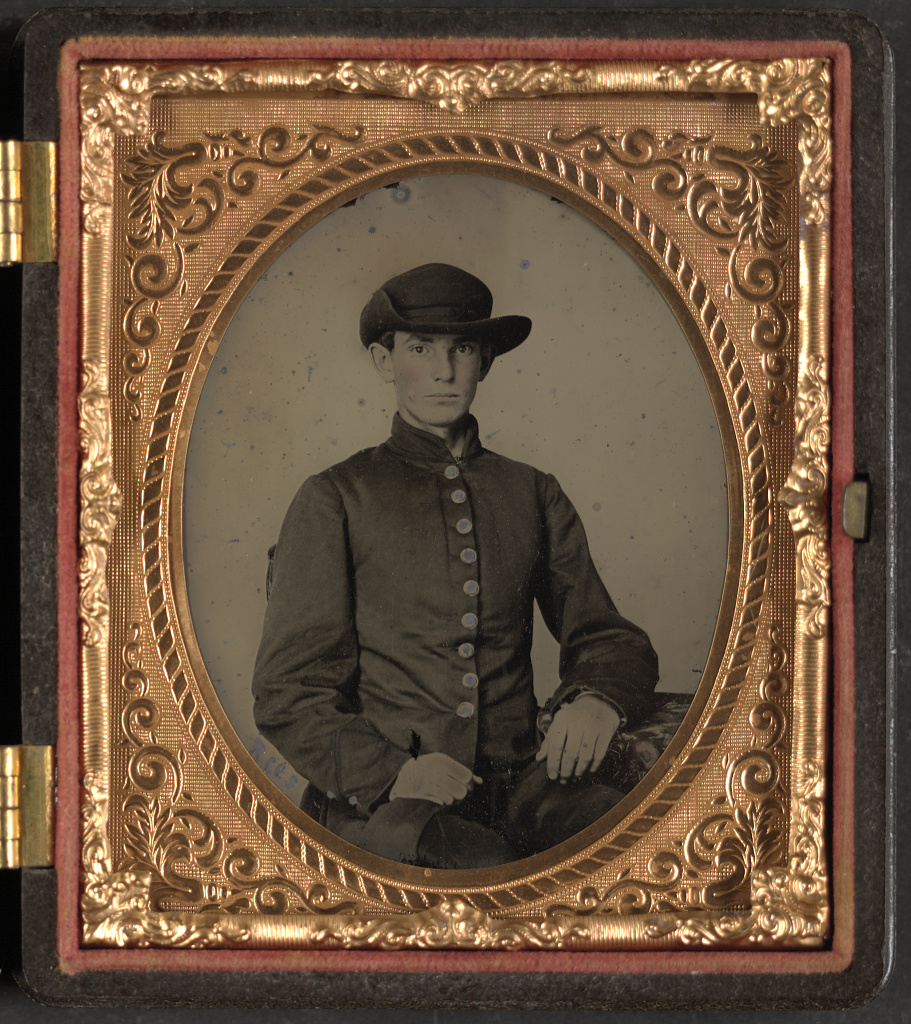
Trooper Robert Vaughan of Co. I, 3rd Virginia Cavalry Regiment

The 3rd Virginia Cavalry Regiment was a cavalry regiment raised in Tidewater and Southside Virginia for service in the Confederate States Army during the American Civil War. Initially assigned to defend the Hampton Roads area, it fought mostly with the Army of Northern Virginia. As shown by the company table below, members were raised in eight counties: Mecklenburg, Elizabeth City, New Kent, Halifax, Nottoway, Cumberland, Dinwiddie, and Prince Edward Counties.

== History ==
The 3rd Virginia Cavalry was organized with independent companies and entered Confederate service on July 1, 1861. On June 28, 1861, the Boydton Cavalry and the Cumberland Light Dragoons rode off to defend Yorktown, Virginia under command of CSA General John B. Magruder, and would there meet seven "veteran" cavalry companies, some of whom had already exchanged fire with Union Troops from Fort Monroe. There Lt. John Bell Hood, who had traveled eastward from Richmond upon orders of General Robert E. Lee drilled them in cavalry techniques. The regiment was formed with eleven companies, later reduced to ten. It was also called 2nd Regiment until October 1, 1861, when placed under the command of Col. Robert Johnston (an 1850 West Point graduate who had spent a decade as lieutenant of cavalry), with Lt. Hood promoted to lieutenant colonel. However, Hood's tenure with the unit only lasted another two weeks, when he was promoted to full colonel and assigned to command the 4th Texas Infantry. Furthermore, in the reorganization and elections of April 25, 1862, Lt. Col. Thomas F. Goode replaced Col. Johnston, who was voted out of office. Capt. John P. Thornton of the Prince Edward Dragoons was then named Lt. Col., defeating Maj. Jefferson C. Phillips, who was then appointed Lt.Col. of the 13th Virginia cavalry. Between September 1861 and April 1862, 93% of the officers at captain or higher grades changed, none as a result of battle casualties.

For a time six of its companies served in the Department of the Peninsula and four in the Valley District. Later the unit was assigned to General Fitzhugh Lee's, then Wickham's, and finally Munford's Brigade, all in the Army of Northern Virginia. It fought in many noted battles from Williamsburg to Fredericksburg, then was involved in the engagements at Kelly's Ford, Chancellorsville, Brandy Station, Upperville, Gettysburg, Bristoe, Mine Run, The Wilderness, Todd's Tavern, Spotsylvania, Haw's Shop, and Cold Harbor. The 3rd went on to participate in Gen. Jubal Early's operations in the Shenandoah Valley and its service ended with the Appomattox Campaign. It took 210 effectives to Gettysburg, but only 3 surrendered on April 9, 1865.

== Companies and officers ==
Its commanders were Colonels Robert Johnston, Thomas F. Goode, and Thomas H. Owen; Lieutenant Colonels John B. Hood, Thomas F. Goode, Thomas H. Owen, William R. Carter, William M. Feild, and John T. Thornton; and Majors John B. Hood, Thomas F. Goode, William R. Carter, Robert Douthat, Jefferson C. Phillips and Henry Carrington Jr. During his time with the regiment Carter kept a field diary, parts of which were published in 1998 under the title Sabres, Saddles, and Spurs. Future Speaker of the Virginia House of Delegates and justice of the Virginia Supreme Court of Virginia Benjamin W. Lacy commanded a company in the 3rd Virginia. Confederate surgeon and Civil War diarist Dr. Richard Eppes initially served with the 3rd Virginia cavalry, before furnishing a substitute to complete his term of service.

Troop: Nickname	Captain	Mustered
A: Mecklenburg "Boydton Cavalry" (or "Meckenburg Dragoons")	Thomas F. Goode, William H. Jones, George D. White, William T. Boyd	14 May 1861
B: Hampton-Newport News "Old Dominion Dragoons"	Jefferson C. Philips, William R. Vaughn, George B. Jones, Jesse S. Jones	14 May 1861
C: Halifax "Black Walnut Dragoons"	William H. Easley, Thomas H. Owen, John A. Chappell, John M. Jordan	20 May 1861
D: "Charles City Troop" or "Light Dragoons"	Robert Douthat, Benjamin H. Harrison, Franklin Guy, James H. Crump, John Lamb	18 May 1861
E: "Nottoway Troop"	John E. Jones, Charles A. Jones, William R. Carter, John K. Jones	27 May 1861
F: "New Kent Cavalry" (or "Light Dragoons")	Melville Vaiden, Telemachus Taylor, Jones R. Christian	28 June 1861
G: "Cumberland Light Dragoons"	Henry R. Johnson; William A. Perkins, James D. Isbell, George H. Mathews Jr., Charles R. Palmore	14 May 1861
H: Halifax "Catawba Troop"	William Collins Jr., Henry Carrington Jr., Clement Carrington	30 May 1861
I (1st): "James City Troop"	George E. Geddy, James H. Allen (troop transferred to 5th Virginia Cavalry on 1 May 1862)	24 June 1861
I (2nd): "Dinwiddie Calvary"	William A. Adams, William M. Feild	29 May 1861
K: "Prince Edward Dragoons"	John T. Thornton, Peyton R. Berkeley, Richard H. Watkins, John H. Knight	24 June 1861

== See also ==
- List of Virginia Civil War units
