= Charles W. Field (Maryland politician) =

American politician and lawyer (1857–1917)

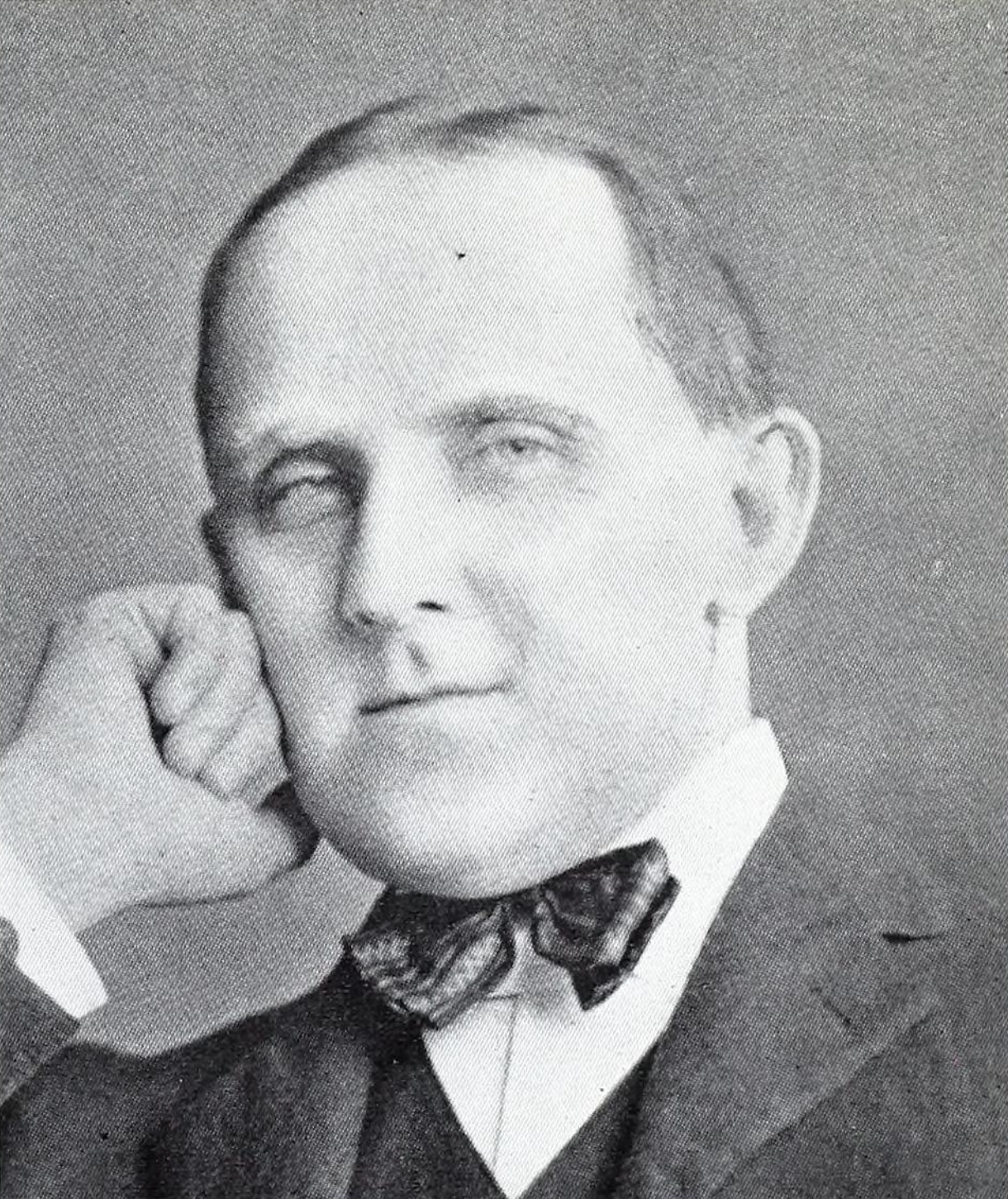
- Field in 1914 publication

Member of the Maryland House of Delegates
- In office 1892–1896

Personal details
- Born: November 18, 1857 near Fredericksburg, Virginia, U.S.
- Died: May 20, 1917 (aged 59) Baltimore, Maryland, U.S.
- Resting place: Green Mount Cemetery; Baltimore, Maryland, U.S.
- Party: Democratic
- Spouse: Alberta L. Von Lingen (m. 1897; died 1916)
- Parent: Charles W. Field (father)
- Education: Bethel Military Academy
- Alma mater: University of Virginia School of Law (LLB)

Charles W. Field (November 18, 1857 – May 20, 1917) was an American politician and lawyer from Maryland. He served in the Maryland House of Delegates, representing Baltimore, from 1892 to 1896.

== Early life ==
Charles W. Field was born on November 18, 1857, near Fredericksburg, Virginia, to Monimia (née Mason) and General Charles W. Field. His ancestor Colonel John Field fought in the American Revolutionary War. His brother was Captain Mason Field. He was educated by his mother until the age of 14. Field then attended Bethel Military Academy. He read law in the office of his uncle J. J. Mason. Field graduated from the University of Virginia School of Law with a Bachelor of Laws in 1879. He was admitted to the bar in 1881.

== Career ==
Field began practicing law in Baltimore. He served as counsel for the Board of Liquor License Commissioners in 1893. He established a partnership with Robert Clinton Cole in 1897. He served as counsel for the North German Lloyd Steamship Company and the Eastern Forwarding Company.

Field was a Democrat. He served in the Maryland House of Delegates, representing the City of Baltimore, from 1892 to 1896. He served as the first assistant city solicitor of Baltimore, in 1903.

== Personal life ==
Field married Alberta L. Von Lingen in 1897. She was the daughter of George L. Von Lingen, former German Counsel. His wife died on December 8, 1916.

Field died on May 20, 1917, at Union Protestant Infirmary in Baltimore. He was buried at Green Mount Cemetery in Baltimore.
