= Charles W. Field =

US and Confederate military officer

Charles William Field
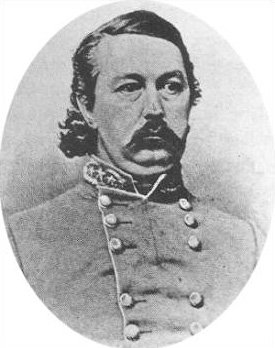
- Born: April 6, 1828; Woodford County, Kentucky, US
- Died: April 9, 1892 (aged 64); Washington, D.C., US
- Burial place: Loudon Park Cemetery, Baltimore, Maryland
- Children: Charles W. Field (son)
- Military career
- Allegiance: United States; Confederate States; Khedivate of Egypt
- Branch: United States Army; Confederate States Army; Egyptian Army
- Service years: 1849–1861 (USA); 1861–1865 (CSA); 1875–1877 (Egypt)
- Rank: Captain (USA); Major General (CSA); Colonel (Egypt)
- Conflicts: American Civil War; Valley Campaign; Peninsula Campaign; Second Battle of Bull Run; Overland Campaign; Battle of Cold Harbor; Siege of Petersburg; Battle of Deep Bottom

Charles William Field (April 6, 1828 – April 9, 1892) was a career military officer, serving in the United States Army and then, during the American Civil War, in the Confederate States Army. His division was considered one of the finest in the Army of Northern Virginia. Field was one of a handful of American officers who advised the army of Egypt following the Civil War.

== Early life ==
Field was born at the family plantation, "Airy Mount," in Woodford County, Kentucky. His parents had immigrated from Virginia, and his father was a personal friend of Henry Clay. Through Clay's and Andrew Jackson's influence, President James K. Polk appointed Field as an "at large" cadet to the United States Military Academy. Field graduated 27th of 43 cadets in the Class of 1849 and accepted a commission as a brevet second lieutenant in the 2nd U.S. Dragoons. He was assigned to frontier duty for five years at various posts in New Mexico, Texas, and the Great Plains. In 1855, he was promoted to first lieutenant and assigned to the newly organized 2nd U.S. Cavalry, a regiment under Col. Albert Sidney Johnston that also included Robert E. Lee and numerous other future Civil War generals. In 1856, Field returned to West Point as Assistant Instructor of Cavalry Tactics. He was promoted to captain in January 1861.

== Civil War ==
With the outbreak of the Civil War, Field resigned his commission on May 30, 1861, and left West Point for Richmond, where he offered his services to the Confederacy. His first assignment was to organize a school for cavalry instruction in Ashland, Virginia. In July, he became major of the 6th Virginia Cavalry, becoming its colonel in November. In March 1862, he was promoted to brigadier general of a brigade of Virginia infantry. He served in what became famed as A.P. Hill's "Light Division" of the Army of Northern Virginia during Stonewall Jackson's Valley Campaign in the spring of 1862. Field performed competently during the Peninsula Campaign, but was severely wounded in the leg at the Second Battle of Bull Run in August. At first, it was feared that the mangled leg would require amputation, but doctors managed to save it. However, it took nearly a year for Field to recuperate, although he never fully recovered. During his convalescence, John M. Brockenbrough and Henry Heth commanded Field's Brigade, which officially retained his name until the Chancellorsville Campaign. In May 1863, using crutches to move, Field was able to resume limited military duties, serving as Chief of the Bureau of Conscription in the War Department until July. He continued as a conscription and recruiting officer for nine more months.

Finally cleared for field duty, Field rejoined the army in Tennessee in February 1864, serving on the board of generals appointed to court-martial Lafayette McLaws. Promoted to major general, he commanded the veteran division formerly led by John Bell Hood. In the confused fighting in the Wilderness, Field suffered two minor wounds, but stayed in action throughout the Overland Campaign, including the Battle of Spotsylvania Court House. When Lt. Gen. James Longstreet was wounded during a friendly-fire incident in the Wilderness, Field briefly assumed command of the First Corps, but he was later replaced by Maj. Gen. Richard H. Anderson, who had more seniority and combat experience. Field's division continued to perform well during the fighting at Battle of Cold Harbor and Siege of Petersburg. On the afternoon of August 16, 1864, at the Battle of Deep Bottom, 5,000 Union soldiers under Brig. Gen. Alfred H. Terry broke through the Confederate lines and briefly threatened to rout the defenders. The tide finally turned when Field orchestrated a hard-hitting counterattack that forced the Federals to retreat. In April 1865, he surrendered with his division at Appomattox Court House. Numbering nearly 5,000 men, it was one of the few units still in fighting condition.

== Postwar career ==
After the war, Field pursued business interests in Maryland and Georgia. He traveled abroad in 1875 and served Isma'il Pasha, the khedive of Egypt, as a colonel of engineers, helping train native officers and supervising several construction projects. He later served as Inspector General. Returning to the United States in 1877, he was nominated for the position of doorkeeper of the U.S. House of Representatives. His service under a foreign head of state technically resulted in the loss of U.S. citizenship, rendering him ineligible for the post. However, former fellow Confederate general Eppa Hunton argued that Field's service was under a private contract and that he had never sworn an oath of allegiance to the khedive. Field was elected to the post.

Field was a member of the Maryland Club in Baltimore.

He became a civil engineer from 1881 through 1888 and then served for a time as superintendent of Hot Springs Reservation (later renamed Hot Springs National Park). He died in Washington, D.C., and was buried in Baltimore, Maryland, in Loudon Park Cemetery. His son Charles W. Field was a Maryland state delegate.

In the 20th century, the commonwealth of Kentucky erected a roadside marker on U.S. Route 62 near Versailles commemorating Woodford County's Civil War generals, including Field.

== See also ==
- List of American Civil War generals (Confederate)
