= Henry Harrison Walker =

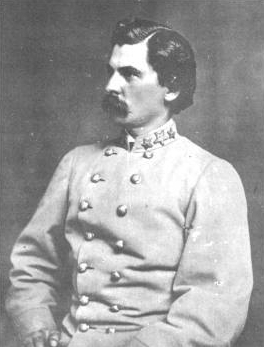
- Born: October 15, 1832; Sussex County, Virginia
- Died: March 22, 1912 (aged 79); Morristown, New Jersey
- Burial place: Morristown, New Jersey
- Military career
- Allegiance: United States of America; Confederate States of America
- Branch: United States Army; Confederate States Army
- Service years: 1853–1861 (USA); 1861–1865 (CSA)
- Rank: First Lieutenant (USA); Brigadier General (CSA)
- Nickname: "Mud"
- Conflicts: American Civil War
- Other work: Stockbroker

Henry Harrison Walker (October 15, 1832 – March 22, 1912) was a Confederate States Army brigadier general during the American Civil War (Civil War). He was born in Sussex County, Virginia. He graduated from the United States Military Academy at West Point, New York, in 1853 and served as an officer in the United States Army from 1853 to 1861. Walker was wounded twice during the war and lost his left foot. After the war, he became a stockbroker at Morristown, New Jersey, where he lived until 1912.

== Early life ==
Walker was born October 15, 1832, at "Elmwood" in Sussex County, Virginia. He graduated from the United States Military Academy at West Point, New York in 1853, forty-first in a class of fifty-two. On July 1, 1853, he was appointed a brevet second lieutenant in the 3rd U.S. Infantry Regiment. On March 3, 1855, he became a full grade second lieutenant in the 6th U.S. Infantry Regiment. Walker was promoted to first lieutenant on May 1, 1857. Walker served in garrison duty on the frontier. He also was aide-de-camp to the governor of Kansas during the border conflicts of the middle to late 1850s as a result of which the territory was called "Bleeding Kansas."

== American Civil War service ==
Henry Harrison Walker resigned from the U.S. Army on May 3, 1861. He had already been appointed a captain in the infantry of the Army of the Confederate States (the regular army of the Confederate States) on March 16, 1861 or, according to other versions, was appointed to this position soon after his resignation from the U.S. Army.

In November 1861, Walker was promoted to lieutenant colonel of the 40th Virginia Volunteer Infantry Regiment. He was promoted to colonel of the regiment in June 1862 and led the men in the Seven Days Battles. On June 27, 1862, he was wounded twice at the Battle of Gaines Mill. He was assigned to command of a convalescent camp and then to the Defenses of Richmond, Virginia, between September 1862 and July 1, 1863. During the Gettysburg campaign, Walker armed hundreds of the convalescents and helped guard Richmond while almost all healthy troops were on the campaign.

On July 1, 1863, Walker was promoted to brigadier general and after the Gettysburg campaign was assigned to Major General Henry Heth's division of III Corps of the Army of Northern Virginia, initially commanding Heth's former brigade, then Brigadier General James J. Archer's brigade as well, after Archer's grievous wounding. Walker served as a brigade commander under Heth until he lost his left foot in the Battle of Spotsylvania Court House on May 10, 1864. He participated in the Battle of Bristoe Station on October 14, 1863; in the Battle of Mine Run; and after serving in the Shenandoah Valley during the winter of 1863–1864, at the Battle of the Wilderness before being wounding at Spotsylvania Court House.

Walker served on court martial duty in the Department of Richmond from November 7, 1864. He was assigned to the defense of the Richmond and Danville Railroad during the Siege of Petersburg from February 1865 to the evacuation of Richmond on the night of April 2, 1865, after the fall of the defenses of Petersburg, Virginia, at the Battle of Five Forks and the Third Battle of Petersburg. He was reported to have brought the news of the surrender of General Robert E. Lee and the Army of Northern Virginia at Appomattox Court House on April 9, 1865, to Confederate President Jefferson Davis at Danville, Virginia. Davis ordered Walker to take the Confederate troops at Danville to join the force of General Joseph E. Johnston in North Carolina but Walker apparently did not comply with the futile order or was unable to comply with it before Johnston surrendered to Union Major General William Tecumseh Sherman on April 18, 1865 (officially April 26, 1865). Walker was paroled at Richmond, Virginia, on May 7, 1865.

== Aftermath ==
After the Civil War, Walker moved to New Jersey and became a stockbroker. Walker died at Morristown, New Jersey, on March 22, 1912. He is buried in Evergreen Cemetery at Morristown.

== See also ==
- List of American Civil War generals (Confederate)
