= Battle of Chantilly order of battle: Union =

The following Union Army units and commanders fought in the Battle of Chantilly of the American Civil War. The Confederate order of battle is shown separately.

== Abbreviations used ==
=== Military Rank ===
- MG = Major General
- BG = Brigadier General
- Col = Colonel
- Ltc = Lieutenant Colonel

=== Other ===
- k = killed

== Army of Virginia ==
=== III Corps, Army of the Potomac ===
MG Samuel P. Heintzelman

Division	Brigade	Regiments and Others
First Division; BG Philip Kearny (k); BG David B. Birney	1st Brigade BG John C. Robinson	20th Indiana; 63rd Pennsylvania; 105th Pennsylvania
First Division; BG Philip Kearny (k); BG David B. Birney	2nd Brigade BG David B. Birney	3rd Maine; 4th Maine; 1st New York; 38th New York; 40th New York; 101st New York; 57th Pennsylvania
First Division; BG Philip Kearny (k); BG David B. Birney	3rd Brigade Col Orlando M. Poe	2nd Michigan; 3rd Michigan; 5th Michigan; 37th New York; 99th Pennsylvania
First Division; BG Philip Kearny (k); BG David B. Birney	Artillery	1st Rhode Island Light, Battery E; 1st United States, Battery K

=== IX Corps, Army of the Potomac ===
MG Jesse L. Reno

Division	Brigade	Regiments and Others
First Division; BG Isaac Stevens (k); Col Benjamin C. Christ	1st Brigade Col Benjamin C. Christ	8th Michigan; 50th Pennsylvania
First Division; BG Isaac Stevens (k); Col Benjamin C. Christ	2nd Brigade Col Daniel Leasure	46th New York (5 companies); 100th Pennsylvania
First Division; BG Isaac Stevens (k); Col Benjamin C. Christ	3rd Brigade Ltc David Morrison	28th Massachusetts; 79th New York
Second Division; MG Jesse L. Reno	1st Brigade Col James Nagle	2nd Maryland; 48th Pennsylvania; 6th New Hampshire; 9th New Hampshire
Second Division; MG Jesse L. Reno	2nd Brigade Col Edward Ferrero	21st Massachusetts; 51st New York; 51st Pennsylvania
