= John Bell Hood =

Confederate Army general (1831–1879)

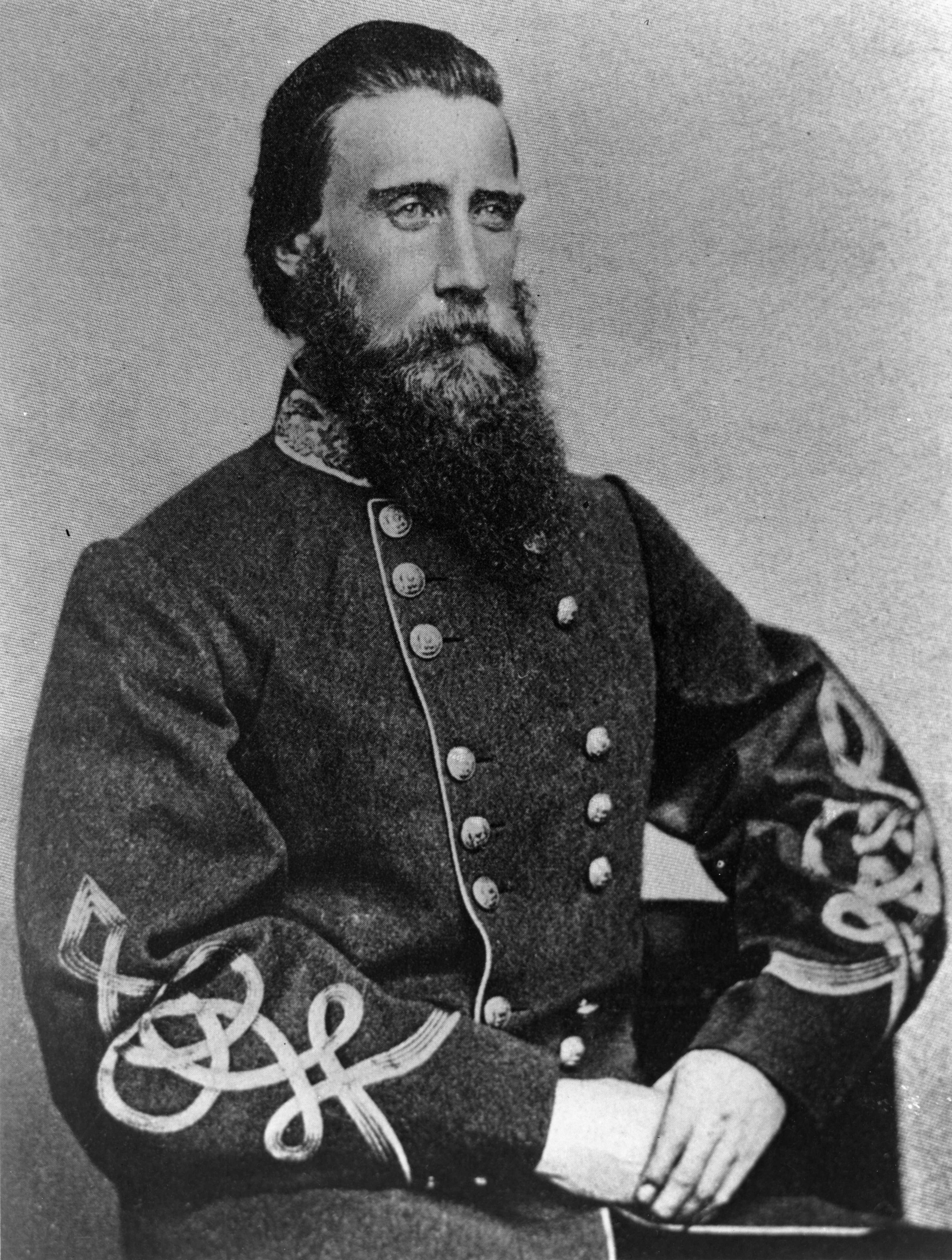
- Born: June 1, 1831 or June 29, 1831; Owingsville, Kentucky, US
- Died: August 30, 1879 (aged 48); New Orleans, Louisiana, US
- Burial place: Metairie Cemetery, New Orleans, Louisiana, US
- Education: United States Military Academy
- Military career
- Allegiance: United States; Confederate States
- Branch: United States Army (USA); Confederate States Army (CSA)
- Service years: 1853–1861 (USA); 1861–1865 (CSA)
- Rank: First Lieutenant (USA); Lieutenant General (CSA)
- Nickname: Sam
- Commands: 4th Texas Infantry Regiment; Texas Brigade; Hood's Division, First Corps, Army of Northern Virginia; Second Corps, Army of Tennessee; Army of Tennessee
- Conflicts: See battles: American Indian Wars; Battle of Devil's River (WIA); American Civil War; Skirmish at Cedar Lane; Peninsula Campaign; Seven Days Battles; Battle of Gaines's Mill; Second Battle of Bull Run; Battle of Antietam; Battle of Fredericksburg; Battle of Gettysburg (WIA); Battle of Chickamauga (WIA); Atlanta campaign; Franklin-Nashville Campaign; Battle of Franklin; Battle of Nashville

John Bell Hood (June 1, 1831 – August 31, 1879) was a Confederate general during the American Civil War.

Hood's education at the United States Military Academy led to a career as a junior officer in the infantry and cavalry of the antebellum U.S. Army in California and Texas. At the start of the Civil War, he offered his services to his adopted state of Texas. He achieved his reputation for aggressive leadership as a brigade commander in the army of Robert E. Lee during the Seven Days Battles in 1862, after which he was promoted to division command. He led a division under James Longstreet in the campaigns of 1862–63. At the Battle of Gettysburg, he was severely wounded, rendering his left arm mostly useless for the rest of his life. Transferred with many of Longstreet's troops to the Western Theater, Hood led a massive assault into a gap in the Union line at the Battle of Chickamauga but was wounded again, requiring the amputation of his right leg.

Hood returned to field service during the Atlanta Campaign of 1864 and, at the age of 33, was promoted to temporary full general and command of the Army of Tennessee at the outskirts of Atlanta, making him the youngest soldier on either side of the war to be given command of an army. There, he dissipated his army in a series of unsuccessful assaults and was forced to evacuate the besieged city. Leading his men through Alabama and into Tennessee, his army was severely damaged in a massive frontal assault at the Battle of Franklin. He was decisively defeated at the Battle of Nashville by his former West Point instructor, Major General George Henry Thomas, after which he was relieved of command.

Hood's impulsiveness led to high losses among the troops under his command, especially as he moved up in the Confederate ranks. Bruce Catton wrote that "the decision to replace Johnston with Hood was probably the single largest mistake that either government made during the war."

After the war, Hood moved to Louisiana and worked as a cotton broker and in the insurance business. His business was ruined by a yellow fever epidemic in New Orleans during the winter of 1878–79. He succumbed to the disease, dying just days after his wife and oldest child, leaving ten destitute orphans.

== Early life ==
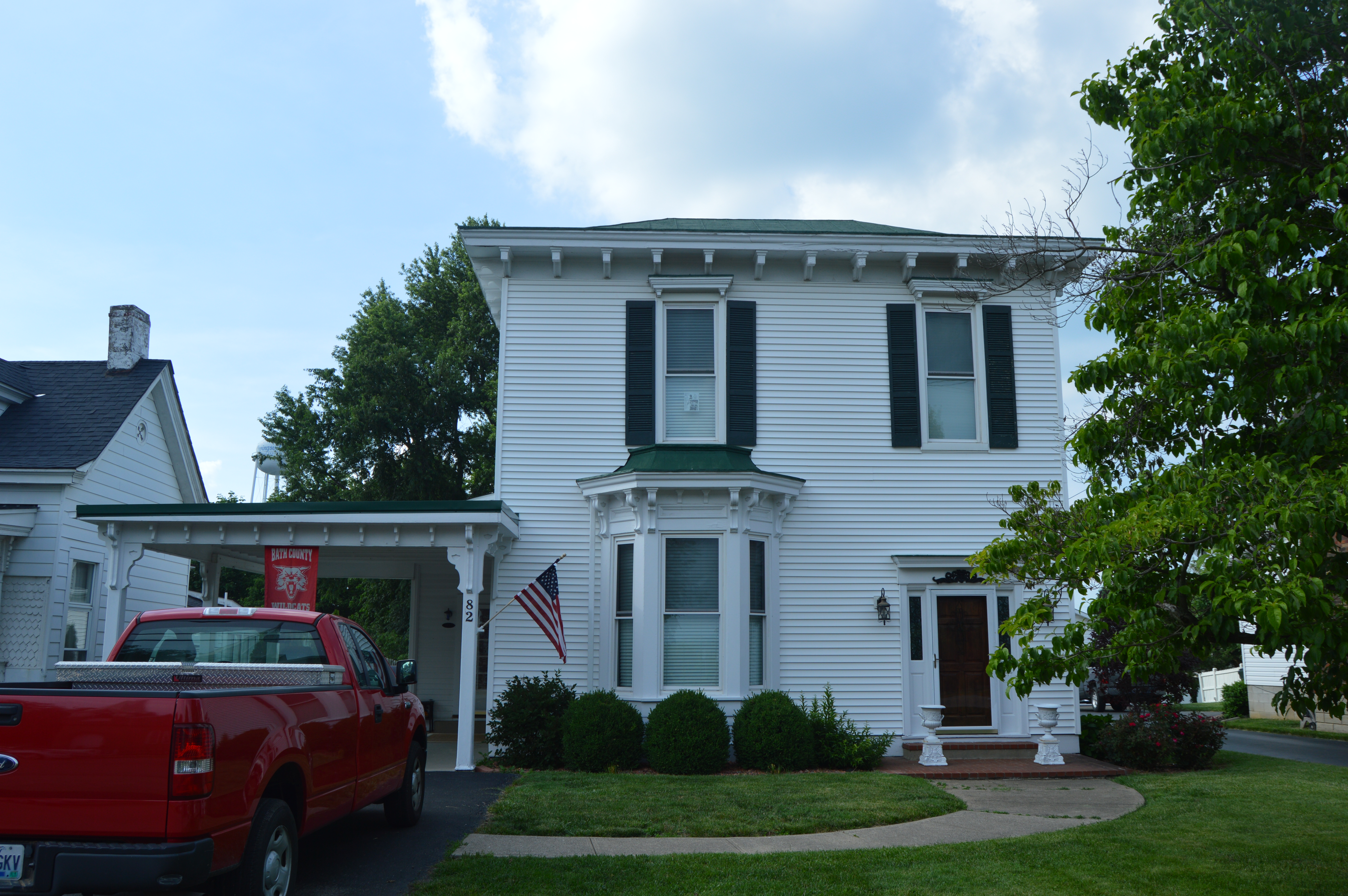
Hood's birthplace

John Bell Hood was born in Owingsville, Kentucky, the son of John Wills Hood (1798–1852), a doctor, and Theodosia French Hood (1801–1886). He was a cousin of future Confederate general G. W. Smith and the nephew of U.S. Representative Richard French. French obtained an appointment for Hood at the United States Military Academy, despite his father's reluctance to support a military career for his son. Hood graduated in 1853, ranked 44th in a class of 52 that originally numbered 96, after a near-expulsion in his final year for excessive demerits (196 of a permissible 200). At West Point, as well as during his later Army years, he was known to friends as "Sam." His classmates included James B. McPherson and John M. Schofield, while he received instruction in artillery from George Henry Thomas. These three men all became U.S. Army generals who would later oppose Hood in battle during the Civil War. The superintendent between 1852 and 1855 was Brevet Colonel Robert E. Lee, who would become Hood's commanding general in the Eastern Theater. Notwithstanding his modest record at the academy, in 1860, Hood was appointed chief instructor of cavalry at West Point, a position he declined, citing his desire to remain with his active field regiment and to retain all of his options in light of the impending war.

Hood was commissioned a brevet second lieutenant in the 4th U.S. Infantry, served at Fort Jones, California, and later transferred to the 2nd U.S. Cavalry in Texas, where he was commanded by Col. Albert Sidney Johnston and Lt. Col. Robert E. Lee. While commanding a reconnaissance patrol from Fort Mason on July 20, 1857, Hood sustained the first of many wounds that marked his life in military service – an arrow through his left hand during action against the Comanches at Devil's River, Texas. He was promoted to first lieutenant in August 1858.

== Civil War ==
=== Brigade and division command ===
Hood resigned from the United States Army immediately after the Battle of Fort Sumter and, dissatisfied with the neutrality of his native Kentucky, decided to serve his adopted state of Texas. He joined the Confederate army as a cavalry captain, then was promoted to major and sent to command Brigadier General John B. Magruder's cavalry in the lower Virginia Peninsula. Hood and his horsemen won a victory at the Skirmish at Cedar Lane on July 12 near Newport News, capturing 12 men of the 7th New York Regiment of Volunteers as well as two deserters from Fort Monroe. They received high praise from Generals Lee and Magruder. By September 30, the Texan was promoted to be colonel of the 4th Texas Infantry Regiment.

On February 20, 1862, Hood was assigned to command a new brigade of mainly Texas regiments, the Texas Brigade. The brigade was initially formed the previous fall, led by ex-US Senator Louis T. Wigfall, but he resigned his command to take a seat in the Confederate Congress. On March 26, Hood was promoted to brigadier general. Leading the Texas Brigade as part of the Army of Northern Virginia in the Peninsula Campaign, he established his reputation as an aggressive commander, eager to lead his troops personally into battle, and the Texans quickly gained a reputation as one of the army's elite combat units. At the Battle of Eltham's Landing, Hood's men were instrumental in nullifying an amphibious landing by a U.S. division. When commanding general Joseph E. Johnston reflected upon the success Hood's men enjoyed in executing his order "to feel the enemy gently and fall back," he humorously asked, "What would your Texans have done, sir, if I had ordered them to charge and drive back the enemy?" Hood replied, "I suppose, General, they would have driven them into the river, and tried to swim out and capture the gunboats." The Texas Brigade was held in reserve at Seven Pines.

At the Battle of Gaines's Mill on June 27, Hood distinguished himself by leading his brigade in a charge that broke the U.S. line, which was the most successful Confederate performance in the Seven Days Battles. Hood survived unscathed, but over 400 men and most of the officers in the Texas Brigade were killed or wounded. He broke down and wept at the sight of the dead and dying men on the field. After inspecting the U.S. entrenchments, Maj. Gen. Stonewall Jackson remarked, "The men who carried this position were truly soldiers indeed."

When Maj. Gen. William H.C. Whiting left the army on medical furlough on July 26, Hood became the permanent division commander, and his command was reassigned to Maj. Gen James Longstreet's corps. While the division had numbered five brigades at Seven Pines, several reorganizations reduced it to just two—the Texas Brigade and a brigade of Mississippians commanded by Col. Evander M. Law. Also accompanying them during the Northern Virginia Campaign was the independent South Carolina brigade of Brig. Gen. Nathan "Shanks" Evans, who technically had authority over Hood, his junior in rank, for the campaign. At Second Bull Run, Hood spearheaded the assault on the U.S. left flank that forced them to retreat from the field. Hood's two brigades lost over 1,000 men in the battle, and if Evans's brigade is also counted in, the total would be nearly 1,500 casualties.

In pursuing U.S. forces, Hood was involved in a dispute with Evans over captured ambulances. Evans arrested Hood, but Gen. Lee intervened and retained him in service. During the Maryland Campaign, just before the Battle of South Mountain, Hood was in the rear, still in virtual arrest. His Texas troops shouted to General Lee, "Give us Hood!" Lee restored Hood to command, despite Hood's refusal to apologize for his conduct.

It could scarcely be said that any [of the officers in Longstreet's corps] ... save one had by this date displayed qualities that would dispose anyone to expect a career of eminence. The exception was Hood. ... Anyone who had followed the operations of the Army after Gaines's Mill would have said that of all the officers under Longstreet, the most likely to be a great soldier was Hood.

— Douglas Southall Freeman, Lee's Lieutenants

During the Battle of Antietam, Hood's division came to the relief of Stonewall Jackson's corps on the Confederate left flank, fighting in the infamous cornfield and turning back an assault by the U.S. I Corps in the West Woods. Afterward, they became engaged with the U.S. XII Corps. In the evening after the battle, Gen. Lee asked Hood where his division was. He responded, "They are lying on the field where you sent them. My division has been almost wiped out." Of his 2,000 men, almost 1,000 were casualties. Jackson was impressed with Hood's performance and recommended his promotion to major general, which occurred effective October 10, 1862.

In the Battle of Fredericksburg in December, Hood's division saw little action, placed in the center, between Longstreet's lines on Marye's Heights and Jackson's lines. And in the spring of 1863, he missed the Battle of Chancellorsville because most of Longstreet's First Corps was on detached duty in Suffolk, Virginia, involving Longstreet himself and Hood's and George Pickett's divisions. When he heard the news of Stonewall Jackson's death after Chancellorsville, he expressed grief for the man he most deeply admired, personally and militarily.

=== Gettysburg ===
It was to Hood that Lee wrote on May 21, 1863, before the Gettysburg campaign on their growing confidence in the Army of Northern Virginia:

I agree with you in believing that our army would be invincible if it could be properly organized and officered. There never were such men in an army before. They will go anywhere and do anything if properly led.

At the Battle of Gettysburg, Longstreet's Corps arrived late on the first day, July 1, 1863. Lee planned an assault for the second day, featuring Longstreet's Corps attacking northeast up the Emmitsburg Road into the U.S. left flank. Hood was dissatisfied with his assignment in the assault because it would face difficult terrain in the boulder-strewn area known as Devil's Den. He requested permission from Longstreet to move around the left flank of the U.S. army, beyond the mountain known as [Big] Round Top, to strike the U.S. soldiers in their rear area. Longstreet refused permission, citing Lee's orders, despite repeated protests from Hood. Yielding to the inevitable, Hood finally gave in, and his division stepped off around 4 p.m. on July 2. Still, various factors caused it to veer to the east, away from its intended direction, where it would eventually meet with U.S. forces at Little Round Top. As the attack started, Hood was the victim of an artillery shell exploding overhead, severely damaging his left arm, which incapacitated him (although the arm was not amputated). His ranking brigade commander, Brig. Gen. Evander M. Law, assumed command of the division. Still, confusion about orders and command status dissipated the direction and strength of the Confederate attack, likely affecting the battle's outcome.

Hood recuperated in Richmond, Virginia, where he made a social impression on the ladies of the Confederacy. In August 1863, famous diarist Mary Boykin Chesnut wrote of Hood:

When Hood came with his sad Quixote face, the face of an old Crusader, who believed in his cause, his cross, and his crown, we were not prepared for such a man as a beau-ideal of the wild Texans. He is tall, thin, and shy; has blue eyes and light hair; a tawny beard, and a vast amount of it, covering the lower part of his face, the whole appearance that of awkward strength. Some one said that his great reserve of manner he carried only into the society of ladies. Major [Charles S.] Venable added that he had often heard of the light of battle shining in a man's eyes. He had seen it once — when he carried to Hood orders from Lee, and found in the hottest of the fight that the man was transfigured. The fierce light of Hood's eyes I can never forget.

As he recuperated, Hood began a campaign to win the heart of the young, prominent South Carolina socialite Sally Buchanan Preston, known as "Buck" to her friends, whom he had first met while traveling through Richmond in March 1863. Hood later confessed that the flirtatious southern belle had caused him to "surrender at first sight." As he prepared to return to duty in September, Hood proposed marriage to Buck but received only a noncommittal response.

=== Chickamauga ===
Meanwhile, in the Western Theater, the Confederate army under General Braxton Bragg was faring poorly. Lee dispatched two divisions of Longstreet's Corps to Tennessee, and Hood was able to rejoin his men at Chickamauga Creek on September 18. Bragg ordered him to form a "mini-corps," merging one of the brigades he had on the field with Brig. Gen. Bushrod Johnson's division. It was then that Hood participated in the Battle of Chickamauga, driving Col. Robert Minty's U.S. brigade from Reed's Bridge and stopping only at Alexander's Bridge, where John T. Wilder's men fired their Spencer repeating rifles on the Confederates. As darkness set in, he chanced upon Gen. John C. Breckinridge, former vice president of the United States, presidential candidate and senator from Kentucky, who also happened to be a cousin of Buck Preston. The remaining two units of Hood's division regrouped with their commander to prepare for the next day's battle.

On the afternoon of the 19th, Hood repulsed an attack by Jefferson C. Davis's U.S. division. He then advanced to assist Brig. Gen Henry D. Clayton's outnumbered men near Lafayette Road. Around this time, Longstreet had arrived; Hood was to be in temporary command of the I Corps, which would serve as part of the Confederate left wing under Longstreet.

On the 20th, Hood led Longstreet's assault that exploited a gap in the Federal line, leading to the defeat of Maj. Gen. William Rosecrans's U.S. Army of the Cumberland. However, Hood was once again wounded severely; his right femur was fractured, and his leg was amputated four inches (100 mm) below the hip. Hood's condition was so grave that the surgeon sent the severed leg with him in the ambulance, assuming they would be buried together. Hood was taken to the home of Col. Francis Little to recover for several weeks before going to Richmond to continue his recovery. Because of Hood's bravery at Chickamauga, Longstreet recommended that he be promoted to lieutenant general as of that date, September 20, 1863; the confirmation by the Confederate Senate occurred on February 11, 1864, as Hood was preparing to return to duty.

During Hood's second recuperation in Richmond that fall, he befriended Confederate President Jefferson Davis, who would subsequently promote him to a more important role. He also resumed his courtship of Buck Preston—a cousin of Breckinridge's—who dashed his hopes on Christmas Eve despite giving him some ambiguously positive signals. Hood confided to Mary Chesnut that the courtship "was the hardest battle he had ever fought in his life." In February, Hood again proposed to Buck, demanding a specific response and receiving a reluctant, embarrassed agreement. However, the Preston family disapproved of Hood, who left for the field unmarried.

=== Atlanta Campaign and the Army of Tennessee ===
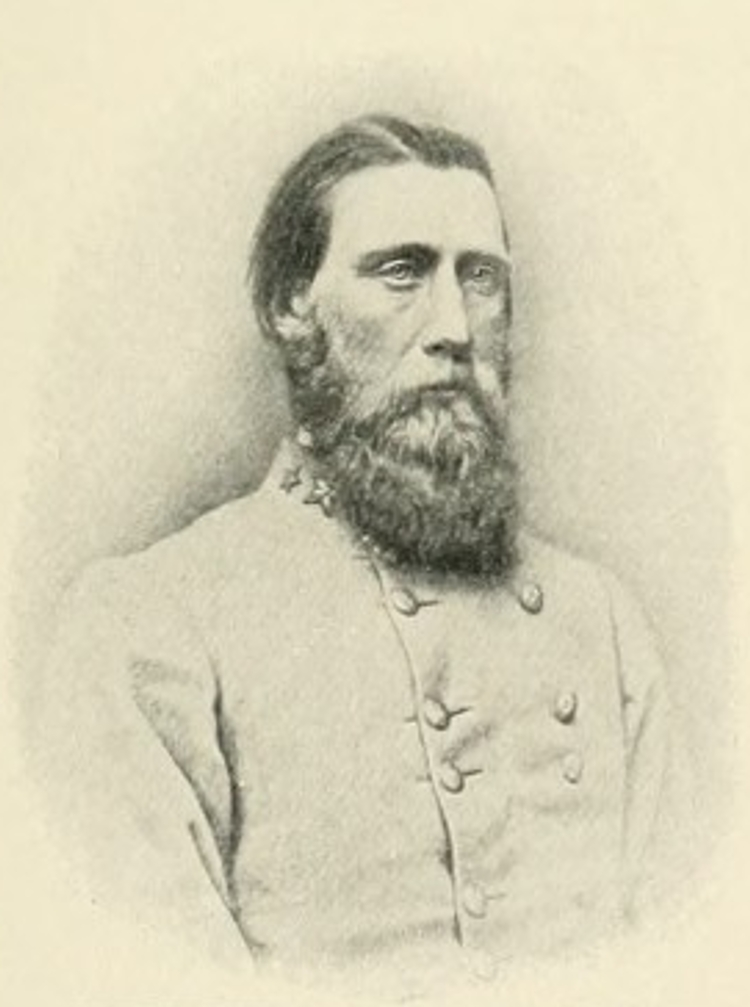
Confederate general John Bell Hood

In the spring of 1864, the Confederate Army of Tennessee, under Gen. Joseph E. Johnston, was engaged in a campaign of maneuver against William T. Sherman, who was driving from Chattanooga toward Atlanta. Despite his two damaged limbs, Hood performed well in the field, riding as much as 20 miles a day without apparent difficulty, strapped to his horse with his artificial leg hanging stiffly, and an orderly following closely behind with crutches. The leg, made of cork, was donated (along with a couple of spares) by members of his Texas Brigade, who had collected $3,100 in a single day for that purpose; it had been imported from Europe through the U.S. blockade. On May 12, Hood was baptized by Lieutenant General Leonidas Polk, the former Episcopal Bishop of Louisiana. Col. Walter H. Rodgers, a witness to the baptism, stated that Hood "looked happy and as though a great burden had been lifted."

During the Atlanta campaign, Hood urged the normally cautious Johnston to act aggressively. Still, Johnston usually reacted to flanking maneuvers by Sherman with timely withdrawals, similar to his strategy in the Peninsula Campaign. One attempt by Johnston to act decisively in the offensive, during the Battle of Cassville, ironically was foiled by Hood, who had been ordered to attack the flank of one column of Sherman's army, but instead pulled back and entrenched when confronted by the unexpected arrival of a small detachment of that column.

The Army of Tennessee continued withdrawing until it had crossed the last major water barrier before Atlanta, the Chattahoochee River. During this time, Hood had been sending the government in Richmond letters very critical of Johnston's conduct, bypassing official communication channels. The issue came to a head when President Jefferson Davis ordered Gen. Braxton Bragg to travel to Atlanta to personally interview Johnston. After meeting with Johnston, he interviewed Hood and another subordinate, Joseph Wheeler, who told him they had repeatedly urged Johnston to attack. Hood presented a letter that branded Johnston as being both ineffective and weak-willed. He told Bragg, "I have, General, so often urged that we should force the enemy to give us battle as to almost be regarded reckless by the officers high in rank in this army [meaning Johnston and senior corps commander William J. Hardee, since their views have been so directly opposite." Johnston's biographer, Craig L. Symonds, judges that Hood's letter "stepped over the line from unprofessional to outright subversive." Civil War historian Steven E. Woodworth wrote that Hood was "letting his ambition get the better of his honesty" because "the truth was that Hood, more often than Hardee, had counseled Johnston to retreat." However, Hood was not alone in his criticism of Johnston's timidity. In William Hardee's June 22, 1864, letter to General Bragg, he stated, "If the present system continues we may find ourselves at Atlanta before a serious battle is fought." Other generals in the Army agreed with that assessment.

On July 17, 1864, Davis relieved Johnston. He considered replacing him with the more senior Hardee, but Bragg strongly recommended Hood. Bragg had not only been impressed by his interview with Hood but also retained lingering resentments against Hardee from bitter disagreements in previous campaigns. Hood was promoted to the temporary rank of full general on July 18 and given command of the army just outside the gates of Atlanta. (Hood's temporary appointment as a full general was never confirmed by the Confederate Senate. His commission as a lieutenant general resumed on January 23, 1865.) At 33, Hood was the youngest man on either side to be given command of an army. Robert E. Lee gave an ambiguous reply to Davis's request for his opinion about the promotion, calling Hood "a bold fighter, very industrious on the battlefield, careless off". Lee also stated in the same letter to Davis that he had a high opinion of Hood's "gallantry, earnestness, and zeal"; however, he remained "doubtful" as to whether Hood possessed all of the qualities necessary to command an army in the field.

The change of command in the Army of Tennessee did not go unnoticed by Sherman. His subordinates, Maj. Gen. James McPherson and Maj. Gen. John Schofield, shared their knowledge of Hood from their time together at West Point. Upon learning of his new adversary's perceived reckless and gambling tendencies, Sherman planned to use that to his advantage.

Hood conducted the remainder of the Atlanta Campaign with the strong, aggressive actions for which he had become famous. He launched four major attacks that summer in an attempt to break Sherman's siege of Atlanta, starting almost immediately with an attack along Peachtree Creek. After hearing that McPherson was mortally wounded in the Battle of Atlanta, Hood deeply regretted his loss. All of the offensives failed, particularly at the Battle of Ezra Church, with significant Confederate casualties. Finally, on the evening of September 1, 1864, Hood evacuated the city of Atlanta, burning as many military supplies and installations as possible.

=== Franklin–Nashville Campaign ===
Map of the Franklin-Nashville Campaign Confederate Union

As Sherman regrouped in Atlanta, preparing for his March to the Sea, Hood and Jefferson Davis met to devise a strategy to defeat him. They planned to attack Sherman's lines of communications between Chattanooga and Atlanta and to move north through Alabama and into central Tennessee, assuming that Sherman would be threatened and follow. Hood's ambitious hope was that he could maneuver Sherman into a decisive battle, defeat him, recruit additional forces in Tennessee and Kentucky, and pass through the Cumberland Gap to come to the aid of Robert E. Lee, who was besieged at Petersburg. However, the plan failed since Sherman felt this development furthered his current objective by removing opposing forces in his path, noting: "If he [Hood] will go to the Ohio River, I'll give him rations. ...my business is down south." Instead of pursuing Hood with his army, he sent Maj Gen. George Henry Thomas to take control of the U.S. forces in Tennessee and coordinate the defense against Hood, while the bulk of Sherman's forces prepared to march toward Savannah.

During their conference, Davis expressed his disappointment in Hood's performance in defending Atlanta, losing almost 20,000 men in ill-advised frontal assaults for no significant gains, and implied that he was considering replacing Hood in command of the army. After the president's departure for Montgomery, Alabama, he telegraphed Hood that he had decided to retain him in command and, acceding to Hood's request, transferred Hardee out of the Army of Tennessee. He also established a new theater commander to supervise Hood and the department of Lt. Gen. Richard Taylor, although the officer selected for the assignment, Gen. P. G. T. Beauregard, was not expected to exert any real operational control of the armies in the field.

Hood's Tennessee Campaign lasted from September to December 1864, comprising seven battles and hundreds of miles of marching. He attempted to trap a large part of the U.S. Army of the Ohio under Major General Schofield at Spring Hill, Tennessee, before it could link up with Thomas in Nashville, but command failures and misunderstandings allowed Schofield's men to pass by Hood's army in the night safely. The next day at the Battle of Franklin, Hood sent his men across nearly two miles of open ground without the support of artillery in a last-gasp effort to destroy Schofield's forces before they could withdraw across the Harpeth River and reach the safety of Nashville, which was only a night's march from Franklin. His troops were unsuccessful in their attempt to breach the U.S. breastworks, suffering severe casualties in an assault that is sometimes called the "Pickett's Charge of the West." Hood's exhausted army failed to interfere as the U.S. forces withdrew into Nashville. He later wrote, "[n]ever did troops fight more gallantly" than at Franklin. Some popular histories assert that Hood acted rashly in a fit of rage, resentful that the U.S. Army had slipped past his troops the night before at Spring Hill, and that he wanted to discipline his army by ordering his men to assault against strong odds. Recent scholarship by Eric Jacobson and Stephen M. Hood discounts this as unlikely, as it was not only militarily foolish but Hood was observed to be determined, not angry, by the time he arrived in Franklin.

Never had there been such an overwhelming victory during the Civil War—indeed, never in American military history.

— Wiley Sword, describing the Franklin–Nashville Campaign

Unwilling to abandon his original plan, Hood stumbled toward the heavily fortified capital of Tennessee and laid siege with inferior forces, which endured the beginning of a severe winter. U.S. Maj. Gen. Thomas attacked and completely routed Hood two weeks later at the Battle of Nashville. During the battle and the subsequent relentless pursuit to the south, the Army of Tennessee ceased to be an effective fighting force, as the campaign cost the army about 23,500 of its initial strength of 38,000. Hood and the remnants of the army retreated as far as Tupelo, Mississippi. Some survivors eventually joined Joseph E. Johnston for the Carolinas campaign against Sherman. P. G. T. Beauregard sought permission to replace Hood with Lt. Gen. Richard Taylor, and the change of command occurred on January 23, 1865. In a speech to his men, Hood hoped they would support Taylor and avenge their comrades "whose bones lay bleaching upon the fields of Middle Tennessee." He returned to Richmond on February 8.

=== Final days of the war ===
In March 1865, Hood requested an assignment to the Trans-Mississippi Theater to report on the situation and assess the possibility of moving troops across the Mississippi River to reinforce the East. He met with Lt. Gen. Taylor in Mississippi in late April and agreed with Taylor's proposal that his force should surrender. He departed to take this recommendation to the commanders remaining in the field. Still, before he arrived in Texas, General Edmund Kirby Smith surrendered his forces, and Hood surrendered himself in Natchez, Mississippi, where he was paroled on May 31, 1865.

=== Race and slavery ===
In a letter Hood wrote to Sherman on September 12, 1864, Hood described his conviction that "negroes" were an inferior race: "You came into our country with your Army, avowedly for the purpose of subjugating free white men, women, and children, and not only intend to rule over them, but you make negroes your allies, and desire to place over us an inferior race, which we have raised from barbarism to its present position, which is the highest ever attained by that race, in any country in all time."

In the same letter, Hood responded to Sherman's accusation that he did not care for the well-being of the women and children of Atlanta, writing: "I believe, for all the true men, aye, and women and children, in my country, we will fight you to the death. Better die a thousand deaths than submit to live under you or your Government and your Negro allies." Within a year, Hood had surrendered.

== Postbellum career ==
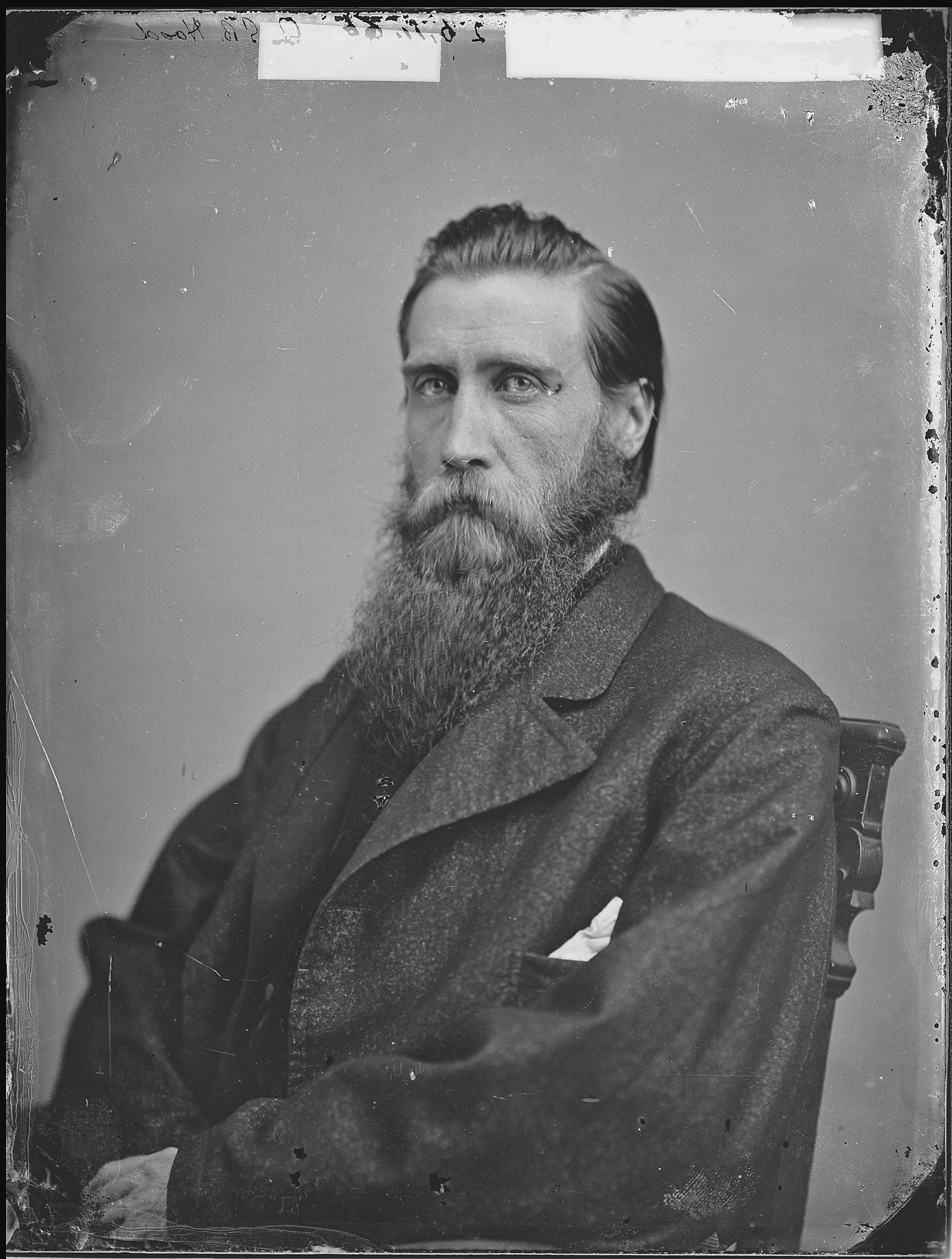
Gen. John Bell Hood post-war

After the war, Hood moved to Louisiana and became a cotton broker and worked as president of the Life Association of America, an insurance business. In 1868, he married New Orleans native Anna Marie Hennen, with whom he had 11 children over 10 years, including three pairs of twins.

During the postwar period, he began a memoir, Advance and Retreat: Personal Experiences in the United States and Confederate States Armies. Though rough, incomplete, and unpublished until after his death, this work served to justify his actions, particularly in response to what he considered misleading or false accusations made by Joseph E. Johnston and to negative portrayals in William Tecumseh Sherman's memoirs.

His insurance business collapsed during the Lower Mississippi Valley yellow fever epidemic of 1878. Soon after, in a single week, the epidemic killed Hood himself (he died on August 30), Hood's wife, and his eldest daughter, Lydia. His other 10 children were left orphaned and destitute. The Texas Brigade Association supported the children for more than 20 years. Seven families in Louisiana, Mississippi, Georgia, Kentucky, and New York eventually adopted all 10.

== Legacy ==
The removal of General Joseph "Joe" Johnston from command by Jefferson Davis in 1864 is often viewed as a significant mistake. Critics argue that Johnston was not suited for the strategic challenges of the time, and his replacement by General Hood led to significant military setbacks, including the loss of Atlanta-Nashville campaign and the reelection of Abraham Lincoln. Many believe that Johnston's defense strategies were effective, and his removal was politically motivated rather than based on military necessity.

John Bell Hood is interred in the Hennen family tomb at Metairie Cemetery in New Orleans. He is memorialized by Hood County in Texas, and by the U.S. Army installation Fort Hood which was named in his honor until May 9, 2023.

The National Defense Authorization Act for Fiscal Year 2021, passed by Congress overriding a previous veto by President Trump, includes a provision that all 10 Army bases named after prominent Confederate military leaders, including Fort Hood, be renamed.

There was a John B. Hood Junior High School at 7625 Hume Dr. in Dallas, Texas, but it was renamed in 2016.

There was a John B. Hood Junior High School at 601 E. 38th St. in Odessa, Texas, but it was renamed in 2015.

Hood Street in Hollywood, Florida, was renamed in 2018.

Stephen Vincent Benét's poem "Army of Northern Virginia" included a passage about Hood:

Yellow-haired Hood with his wounds and his empty sleeve,
Leading his Texans, a Viking shape of a man,
With the thrust and lack of craft of a berserk sword,
All lion, none of the fox.
When he supersedes
Joe Johnston, he is lost, and his army with him,
But he could lead forlorn hopes with the ghost of Ney.
His bigboned Texans follow him into the mist.
Who follows them?

Private Sam Watkins of the 1st Tennessee Infantry "Maury Greys" wrote the following epitaph to Hood, published in various editions of his memoirs Company Aytch:

But the half of brave Hood's body molders here.
The rest was lost in honor's bold career.
Though fame and limbs he scattered all around;
Yet still though mangled was with glory crowned.
For ever ready with his blood to part,
War left him nothing whole, except his heart.

Watkins was also sympathetic with the Texas general and recounted the private Tennessean soldiers' honor of having to serve under him in several passages. While previously critical of Hood after Nashville, he later changed his opinion. In one of the "Other Sketches" of his aforementioned memoir, he offers the following appraisal of Hood:

General John B. Hood did all that he could. The die had been cast. Our cause had been lost before he took command...

In Bell I. Wiley's 1943 book, The Life of Johnny Reb, the Common Soldier of the Confederacy, he recounts that after the defeats in the Franklin-Nashville Campaign, Hood's troops sang with wry humor a verse about him as part of the song The Yellow Rose of Texas.

My feet are torn and bloody,
My heart is full of woe,
I'm going back to Georgia
To find my uncle Joe [Johnston].
You may talk about your Beauregard,
You may sing of Bobby Lee,
But the gallant Hood of Texas
He played hell in Tennessee.

In the 1993 film Gettysburg (the adaptation of Michael Shaara's novel The Killer Angels), and Gods and Generals, adapted from the book by Jeff Shaara, Hood was portrayed by Patrick Gorman. At the time Gorman played Hood in Gods and Generals he would have been more than 25 years older than the age Hood would have been during the events portrayed. Gorman appeared as an older man with graying hair while the real Hood was known for having blonde hair and a youthful appearance.

In the 2009 film In the Electric Mist Hood was portrayed by Levon Helm.

== See also ==
- List of American Civil War generals (Confederate)
- Stephen D. Lee, youngest Confederate lieutenant general.
